= Church's Hill Halt railway station =

Disused railway station in Ashley, Gloucestershire

Church's Hill Halt

General information
- Location: Ashley, Gloucestershire; England
- Coordinates: 51.6654°N 2.0997°W
- Grid reference: ST932963
- Platforms: 1

Other information
- Status: Disused

History
- Original company: British Railways

Key dates
- 2 February 1959: Opened
- 6 April 1964: Closed
Location

Church's Hill Halt railway station served the village of Ashley, Gloucestershire, England, from 1959 to 1964 on the Tetbury Branch Line.

== History ==
The station was opened on 2 February 1959 by British Railways in an attempt to improve patronage on the introduction of a Railbus on the Tetbury and Cirencester branch lines. Other halts opened on the branches at the same time were Chesterton Lane Halt, Park Leaze Halt, and Trouble House Halt. It closed on 6 April 1964.

Preceding station	Disused railways	Following station
Rodmarton Platform; Line and station closed	Great Western Railway; Tetbury Branch Line	Culkerton Halt; Line and station closed
