= Jackament's Bridge Halt railway station =

Former railway station in England

Jackament's Bridge Halt

General information
- Location: Kemble, Cotswold; England
- Coordinates: 51.6731°N 2.0484°W
- Grid reference: ST967971
- Platforms: 1

Other information
- Status: Disused

History
- Original company: Great Western Railway
- Post-grouping: Great Western Railway

Key dates
- 3 July 1939: Station opened
- 27 September 1948: Station closed
Location

Jackament's Bridge Halt railway station served RAF Kemble, on the boundary of Gloucestershire and Wiltshire, England. It was open between 1939 and 1948.

== History ==
The halt opened on 3 July 1939. There was one wooden platform, with no shelter. It was initially opened for the benefit of the construction workers engaged on building Kemble Airfield for the RAF. For these, one morning train was provided from Cirencester which arrived at 7:10 am, with an evening return service departing at 5:20 pm; but once the airfield was complete, all trains on the Tetbury branch called at the station.

It closed on 27 September 1948.

Preceding station	Disused railways	Following station
Rodmarton Platform; Line and station closed	Great Western Railway; Tetbury branch line	Kemble; Line closed, station open
