= Culkerton Halt railway station =

Disused railway station in Gloucestershire, England

Culkerton
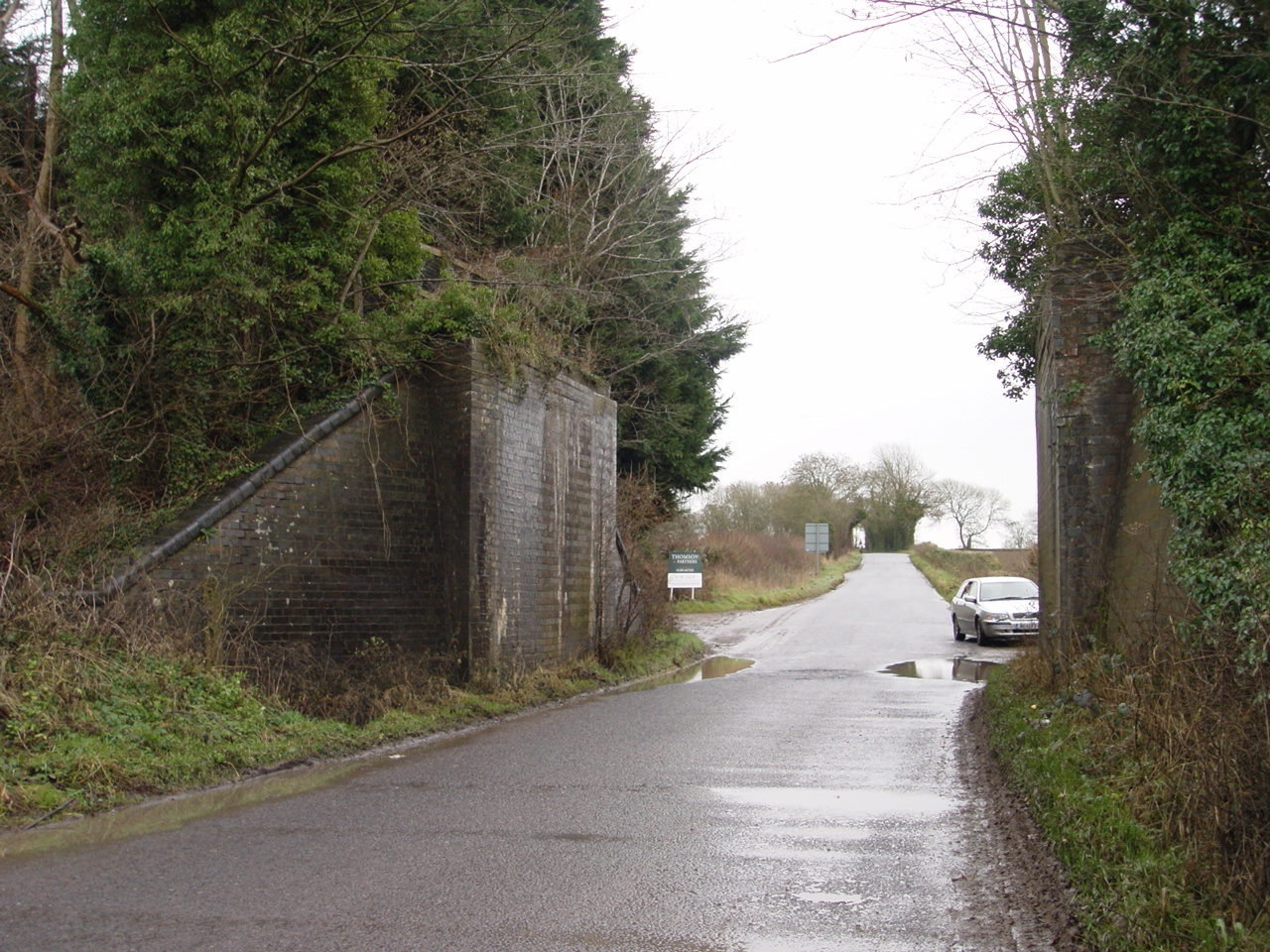
- The site of the old railway bridge in 2013

General information
- Location: Culkerton, Gloucestershire; England
- Coordinates: 51.6627°N 2.1127°W
- Grid reference: ST932960
- Platforms: 1

Other information
- Status: Disused

History
- Original company: Great Western Railway
- Pre-grouping: Great Western Railway
- Post-grouping: Great Western Railway

Key dates
- 2 December 1889: Opened as Culkerton
- 5 March 1956: Temporarily closed
- 2 February 1959: Reopened as Culkerton Halt
- 2 February 1964: Closed
Location

Culkerton Halt railway station served the hamlet of Culkerton, Gloucestershire, England, from 1889 to 1964 on the Tetbury Branch Line.

== History ==
The station was opened as Culkerton on 2 December 1889 by the Great Western Railway. It closed temporarily on 5 March 1956 but reopened as Culkerton Halt on 2 February 1959, with Bradshaw's only adding 'Halt' in May 1960. It closed permanently on 6 April 1964.

Preceding station	Disused railways	Following station
Church's Hill Halt; Line and station closed	Great Western Railway; Tetbury Branch Line	Trouble House Halt; Line and station closed
