= Trouble House Halt railway station =

Former railway station in England

Trouble House Halt
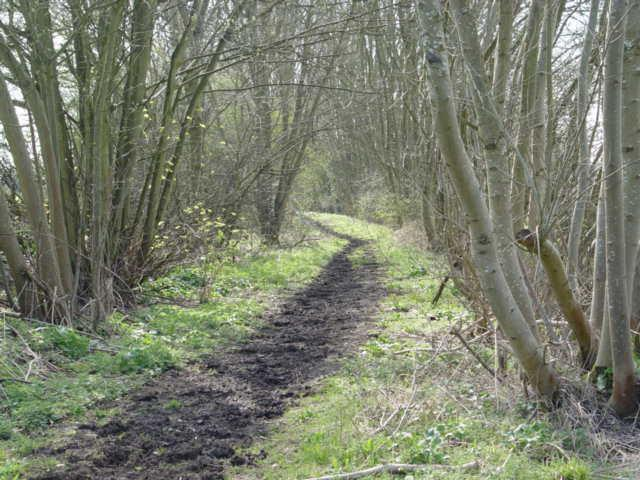
- Site of Trouble House Halt in 2005

General information
- Location: Cotswold; England
- Coordinates: 51.656870°N 2.124995°W
- Grid reference: ST914953
- Platforms: 1

Other information
- Status: Disused

History
- Original company: Western Region of British Railways

Key dates
- 2 February 1959: Opened
- 6 April 1964: Closed
Location

Trouble House Halt was a small station in Gloucestershire, England. It was on the Tetbury branch line between Kemble and Tetbury between 1959 and 1964, when the line closed as part of the Beeching cuts.

== History ==
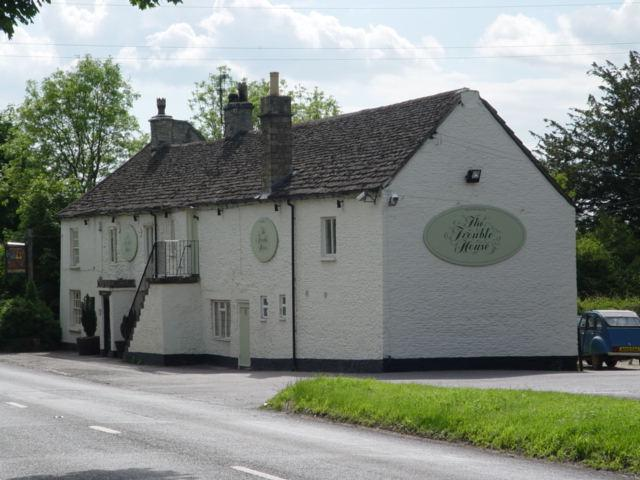
The Trouble House Inn on the A433 near Tetbury

Diesel railbus services were introduced by British Railways Western Region on the Tetbury branch line on 2 February 1959, and on the same day two halts were opened on that line, at Church's Hill and at Trouble House. It was built to serve a 17th-century public house, the Trouble House Inn, which had originally been called the Waggon and Horses, but was later renamed because it had been built on flood-prone land known as "The Troubles" and also for the difficulties which beset a series of innkeepers in the 18th and 19th centuries, including being taken by a press gang. It was the only station in England built specifically to serve a pub, although Berney Arms station in Norfolk has much the same function.

The station itself consisted only of a wooden platform and was known locally as "Beercrate Halt". Late-night travellers had to flag down a train by showing a lighted match. The line and station were closed on 6 April 1964, but the station was immortalised in that year in the song "Slow Train" by Flanders & Swann.

On 4 April 1964, the last day of operation, when the last passenger train from Tetbury arrived at Trouble House Halt, a coffin was loaded onto the train by bowler-hatted mourners. It had been made by the landlord of the pub together with his brother, covered with inscriptions and filled with empty whisky bottles. On arrival at Kemble, the coffin was transferred to a train for Paddington, addressed to Richard Beeching. The last passenger train to Tetbury found its approach to Trouble House Halt blocked by burning hay bales.
