= Rodmarton Platform railway station =

Former railway station in England

Coordinates: 51.6703°N 2.0839°W

Rodmarton Platform

General information
- Location: Rodmarton, Gloucestershire, Cotswold; England
- Platforms: 1

Other information
- Status: Disused

History
- Original company: Great Western Railway
- Post-grouping: Great Western Railway

Key dates
- 1904: opened
- 1964: closed
Location

Rodmarton Platform was a railway station serving the village of Rodmarton on the Tetbury branch line between Cirencester and Tetbury in Gloucestershire. The station opened on 1 September 1904 and closed in April 1964 as a result of the Beeching Axe.

Rodmarton Platform was the first Great Western station to use the name "platform". The term originally came from Scottish railway stations was used by Great Western to describe stations smaller than fully-fledged stations but longer than halts, and ones that offered services such as ticket sales, mail transport and some light goods. The wooden platform carried a "Pagoda" shelter for passenger use.

Rodmarton Platform was opened to serve the small village of Rodmarton, though the railway and station was sited some distance from the village.

== Route ==
Preceding station	Disused railways	Following station
Jackaments Bridge Halt; Line and station closed	Great Western Railway; Tetbury branch line	Church's Hill Halt; Line and station closed
