= Chesterton Lane Halt railway station =

Former railway station in Gloucestershire, England

Chesterton Lane Halt

General information
- Location: Chesterton, Cirencester, Cotswold District, England
- Coordinates: 51.708°N 1.965°W
- Platforms: 1

Other information
- Status: Disused

History
- Original company: Western Region of British Railways

Key dates
- 2 February 1959: Station opened
- 6 April 1964: Station closed
Location

Chesterton Lane Halt served the Cirencester suburb of Chesterton, in Gloucestershire, England. It was one of two intermediate railway stations on the Cirencester branch line from Kemble and was only open for five years between 1959 and 1964.

== History ==
The branch line to Cirencester Town had opened on 31 May 1841; however, no intermediate stations were present until Chesterton Lane Halt was opened by British Railways on 2 February 1959, followed by Park Leaze Halt in 1960. It consisted of a rail level platform mainly built of old sleepers, only long enough to accommodate the single-carriage railbus which operated on the line.

The halt was closed with the end of passenger services on the Cirencester Town branch on 6 April 1964; the last trains ran on the evening of 5 April.

| Preceding station | Disused railways | Following station |
|---|---|---|
| Cirencester Town; Line and station closed | Western Region of British Railways; Cirencester Branch Line | Park Leaze Halt; Line and station closed |

== The site today ==
Since closure, the cutting in which halt was sited has been infilled upon which Meadow Road has been built.

== Reopening ==
A community railway project is campaigning to rebuild the line between Cirencester and Kemble to reconect the area to the railway network. The plans would see a new station built near Chesterton Lane Halt. By January 2023, the project bid for the final tranche of funding for a feasibility study.
