= Tetbury branch line =

UK railway branch line

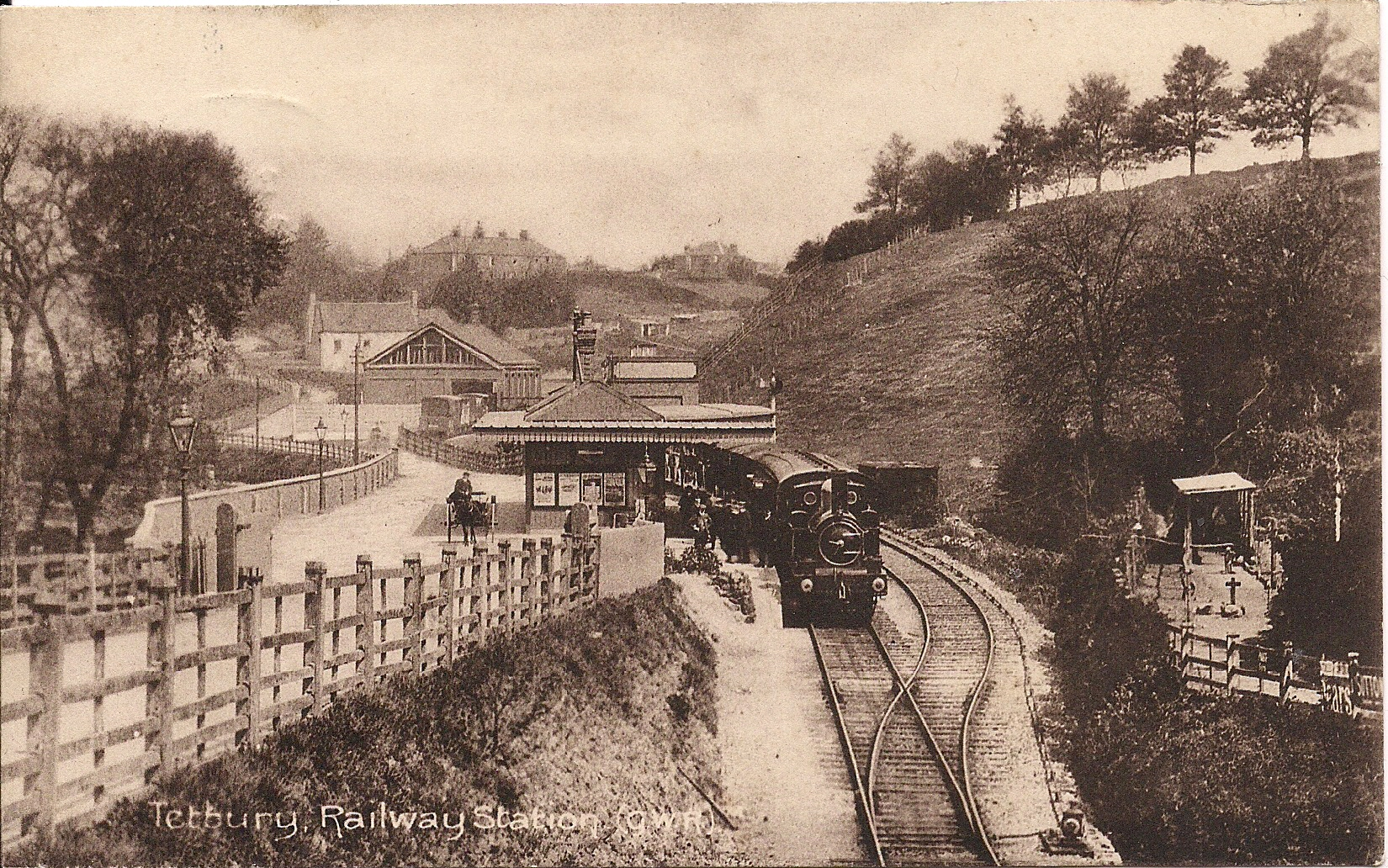
- Tetbury railway station

Overview
- Termini: Kemble railway station; Tetbury railway station

History
- Opened: 2 December 1889
- Closed: 4 April 1964

Technical
- Line length: 7 miles 6 chains (11.4 km)
- Track gauge: 1,435 mm (4 ft 8 1/2 in) standard gauge

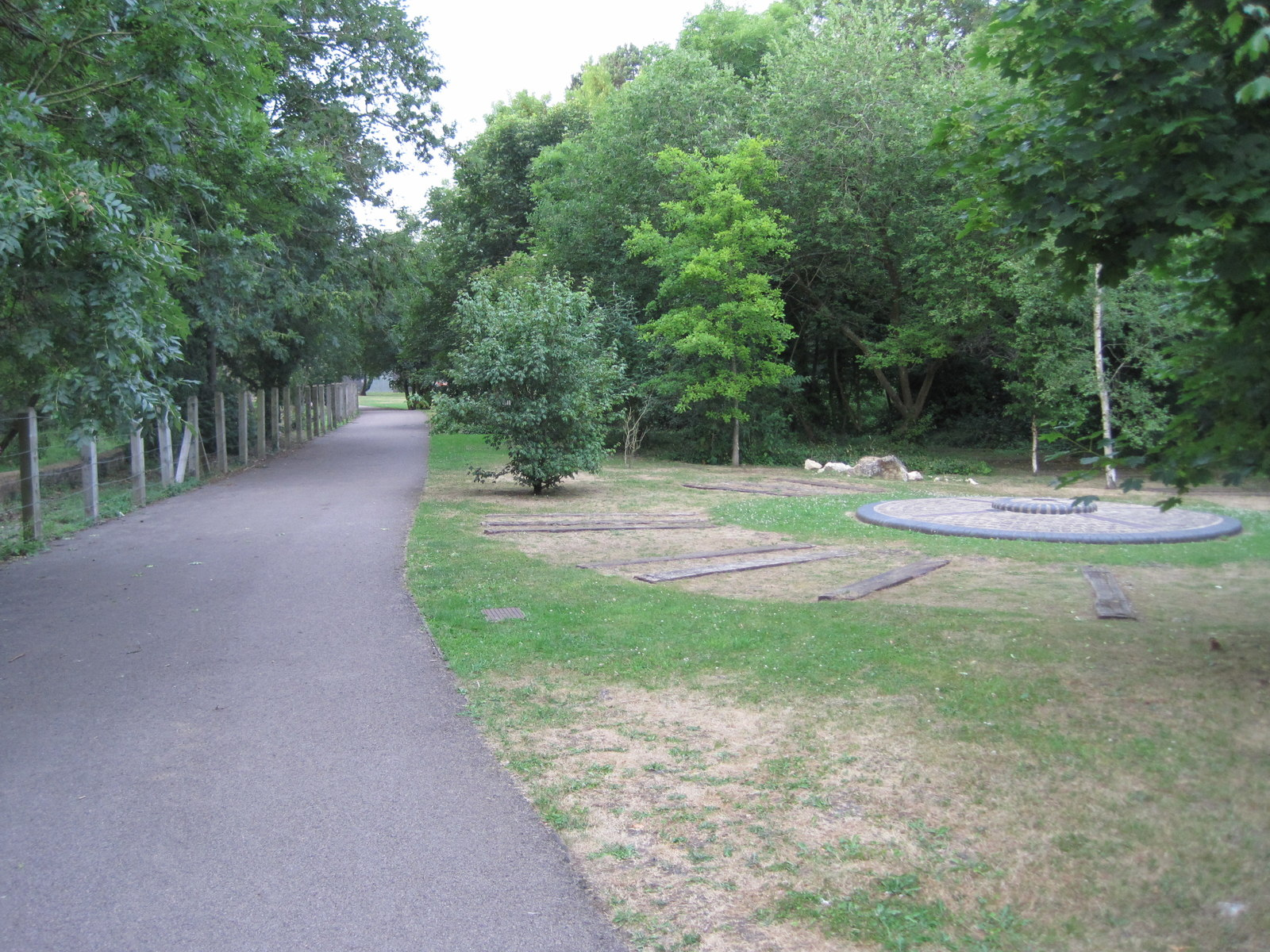
The site of Tetbury railway station in 2010.

The Tetbury branch line was a 7 1/2-mile (12.1 km) single-track branch railway line that connected Tetbury with the main line at Kemble on the line between Swindon and Gloucester.

Opened in 1889, the line's usage declined after 1930 as road competition became stronger. In 1959 diesel railbuses were used for the line's passenger services; this initiative halted the decline, but did not reverse the financial losses on the line, and it closed completely in 1964.

== The main line at Kemble ==
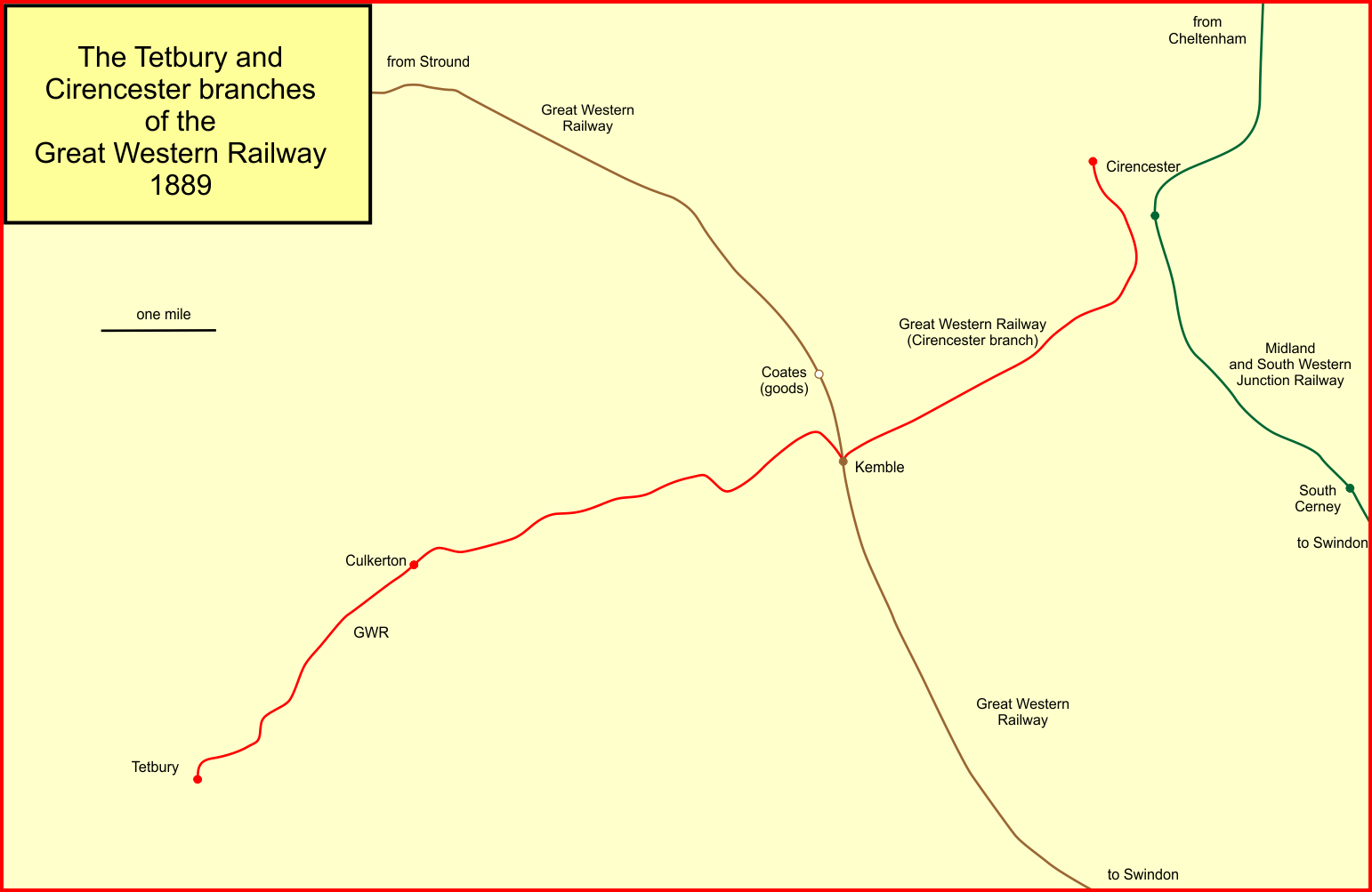
The Tetbury branch in 1889

Following on from the successful completion of the Great Western Railway between London and Bristol, there was a desire to open further railways connecting other important centres to the emerging railway network. The Cheltenham and Great Western Union Railway (C&GWUR) was authorised in 1836 to build a line connecting Swindon (on the London to Bristol main line) and Cheltenham. The C&GWUR ran into financial difficulties, and was unable to open its line promptly throughout, but it opened a section from Swindon to Cirencester via Kemble on 31 May 1841.

The Great Western acquired the partly built C&GWUR line in 1843 and proceeded with the construction of the remainder of the line. (Note: Ratified by Act in 1844.) It opened onwards from Kemble on 12 May 1845, and there was a station named Tetbury Road. It was located close to the present-day Thames Head public house, immediately north of the Cirencester–Tetbury road.

The line was 7 ft 1/4 in (2,140 mm) broad gauge, until gauge conversion to 4 ft 8 1/2 in (1,435 mm) standard gauge in 1872. Tetbury Road station closed in 1882, remaining in service as Coates Goods depot.

== A line to Tetbury ==
Railway Mania brought a huge number of railway schemes to the fore, and in the peak year of 1845 a Wiltshire and Gloucestershire Junction Railway was put forward. Running broadly north to south from Stonehouse to Chippenham, it would have passed close to Tetbury, but it was not built in the proposed form. Subsequently, several schemes for north–south long-distance routes came and went.

A realistic proposal came forward when the independent Swindon and Cheltenham Railway (Note: Later named the Midland and South Western Junction Railway.) put forward a scheme for an extension of its own (as yet unbuilt) line. Its own main line was to run north from Swindon through Cirencester, and the extension would be a branch from Siddington, on its main line south of Cirencester, to Tetbury, crossing the GWR line. The GWR did not welcome a new line making a further encroachment into territory it considered its own, and it opposed the scheme in Parliament in 1883. To kill off the proposal it gave a formal undertaking to build a Tetbury branch itself.

Accordingly, in the 1884 session of Parliament, the GWR sought authorisation of a line from Kemble to Tetbury, 7 miles 6 chains in length, at an estimated cost of £68,000, and the construction was authorised by the Great Western Railway (No. 1) Act 1884 (47 & 48 Vict. c. ccxxxv]) of 7 August 1884. The GWR displayed no urgency in constructing the line and it was not until late 1887 that work started.

A railway (No. 2) seven miles and six chains in length commencing in the parish of Kemble in the county of Wilts by a junction with the Company's railway from Swindon to Gloucester and terminating in the parish of Long Newnton in the same county at the northern side of the public carriage road leading from Tetbury to Malmesbury and about four chains north-westward of the Tetbury Cottage Hospital. — Section 4, Great Western Railway (No. 1) Act 1884 (47 & 48 Vict. c. ccxxxv])

== Construction and opening ==
The earthworks were generally rather light, the greatest difficulty being cutting through a spur of rock near Tetbury to make a flat area for the goods yard part of the station. On 20 November 1889 Col. Rich inspected the line on behalf of the Board of Trade; he reported that the 4 ft 8 1/2 in (1,435 mm) standard gauge permanent way consisted of 80 pounds per yard (39.7 kg/m) Vignoles rail, fang bolted to sleepers. The line was single track, worked by train staff, and there were signal boxes at Kemble and at Tetbury, and the block telegraph was used. A siding at Culkerton was accessed by the use of a ground frame released by a key on the train staff.

The line opened to the public on 2 December 1889.

== Train service ==
The initial train service consisted of five passenger trains each way daily, except Sundays. It appears that mixed trains were the rule; in 1902 the 08:35 and 10:10 trains from Kemble, and the 11:50 trains from Tetbury were regularly mixed trains.

In the first few years of the twentieth century there were six return trains daily, taking between 17 and 25 minutes for the journey; the two mixed trains were allowed thirty minutes.

== Signalling improvements ==
By 1910 the train staff system of operation was updated using the Webb and Thompson electric train staff system. The branch was controlled from Kemble West signalbox, and the signalbox at Tetbury. In 1929 the West box and the east box which controlled the Cirencester line, were abolished, and a new 62 lever box commissioned. From 1936 the Tetbury line was worked by the one engine in steam system. There were six round train trips daily at that time.

The main line passenger train service was augmented considerably after World War II but the connections to and from the Tetbury line were sporadic.

== Changes to infrastructure ==
There was originally only a single intermediate station on the line, at Culkerton, but another, Rodmarton Platform, was added on 1 September 1904. Rodmarton Platform was the first GWR stopping place to be designated "platform"; the term had been used in Scotland, to distinguish from a "halt".

The station at Tetbury was originally constructed of timber, possibly to enable continuation of the line beyond Tetbury later. In 1916, the station building was in a poor condition, and a brick replacement was built.

An additional wooden-platformed halt was added at Jackament's Bridge on 3 July 1939, to serve the nearby RAF aerodrome but this closed after the war in September 1948.

Due to low usage, Culkerton station was closed on 5 March 1956, but it was later re-opened for the diesel railbus service.

== Engines and rolling stock ==
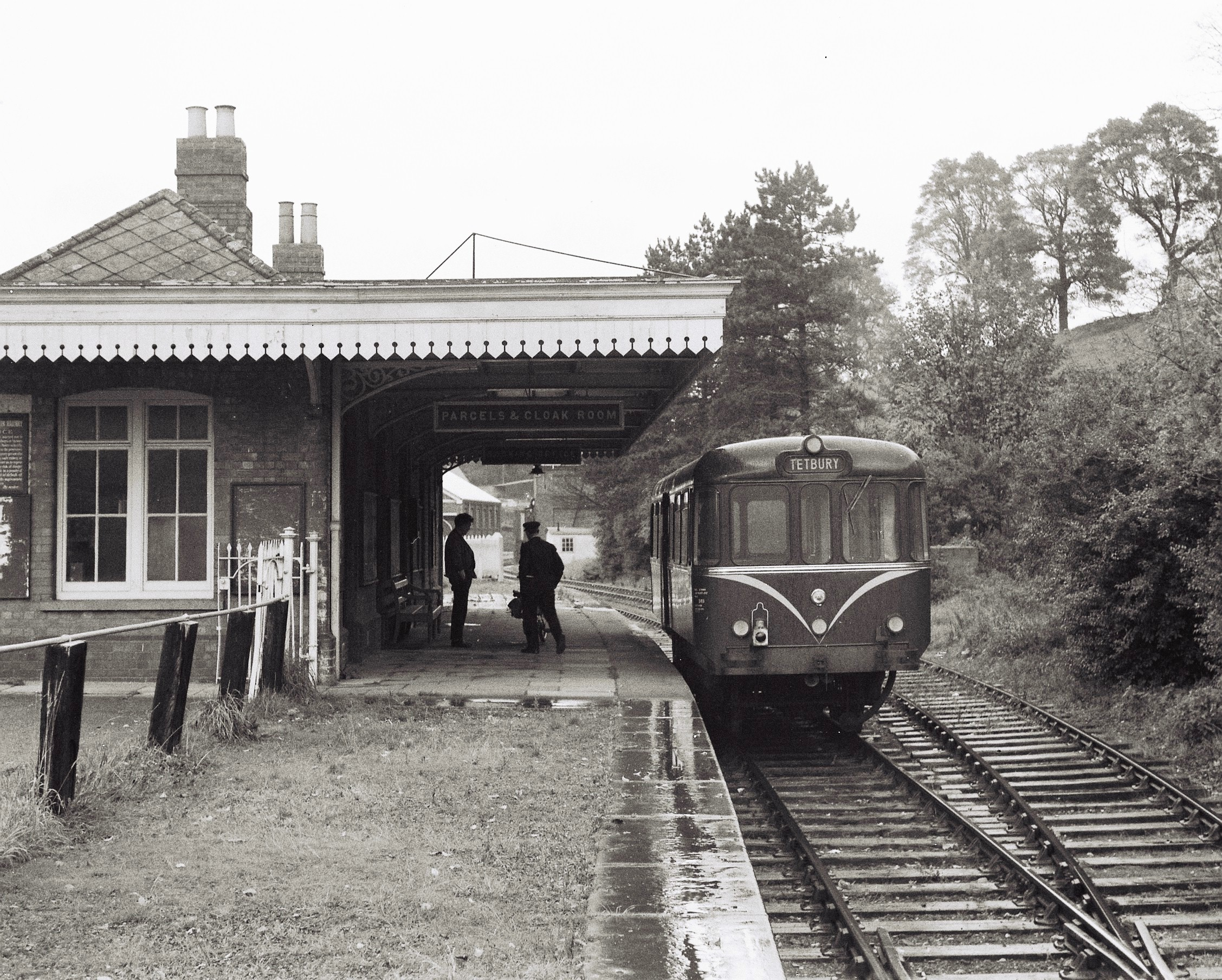
A diesel railbus at Tetbury station in the 1960s

For most of its existence, the daily routine on the branch line was the running of 8 trains per day up and down the line operated by steam tank engines. The passenger service usually consisted of two or three carriages and any freight wagons were added to the passenger train. The train engine performed any required shunting of goods wagons; for that reason the auto-train system was generally not favoured because of the time involved in uncoupling the through control mechanism if the engine was to be uncoupled from the passenger vehicle.

At first 0-4-2 side tanks such as the GWR 517 Class were the main engine power on the line; later the 48XX and 58XX classes were in use, and later still 0-6-0 pannier tanks such as the GWR 1600 Class predominated.

The GWR appears never to have used their diesel railcars on the line.

== Sentinel locomotives ==
In 1926, the GWR purchased two patent geared, four-wheeled steam locomotives from the Sentinel Waggon Works. They had vertical boilers set within the cab, rather than at one end. Capable of a speed of 15 miles per hour (24 km/h), No 12 was tested on the Tetbury branch, but it was not a success.

== Railbuses ==
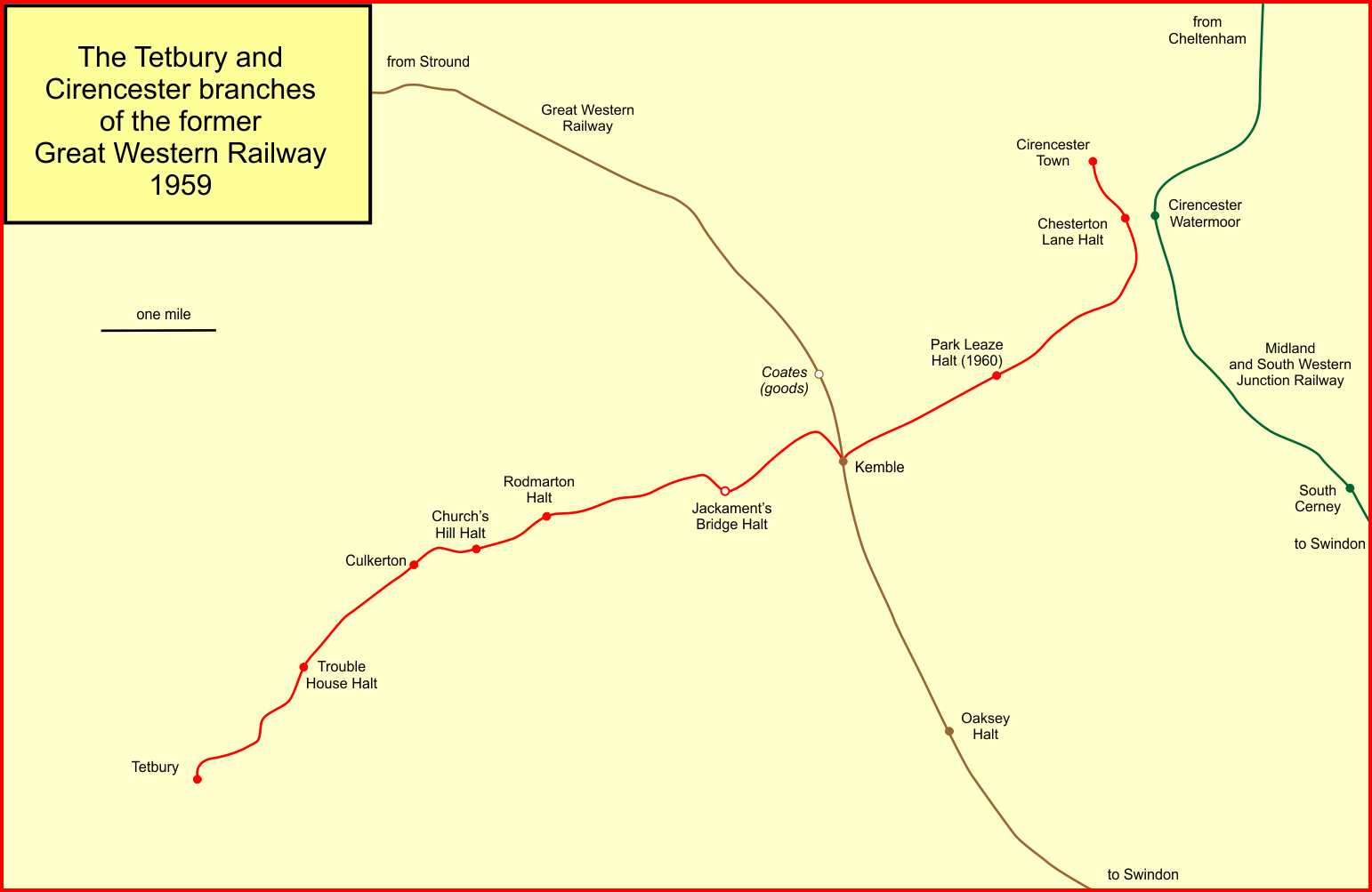
The branch in 1959

Passenger business on the line declined sharply from the 1930s, and further after 1945. In a cost-cutting measure aimed at reviving the fortunes of the line, diesel railbuses were introduced on the passenger service in February 1959, which also served the Cirencester branch. The service frequency was improved, and Culkerton station (which had been closed in 1956) was re-opened as a halt. New halts were provided at Church's Hill and Trouble House. The service of eight trains, from Monday to Saturday only, was provided by AC four-wheeled railbuses, seating 46 passengers, powered with 150 horsepower (110 kW) British United Traction diesel engines. There was a crew of two, with the guard selling tickets, avoiding the cost of staffing Tetbury booking office. The new halts were low-level platforms, reached from the railbus by extending steps.

At first there was a marked upsurge in passenger usage, to almost 13,000 annually, but that was not sustained, and the service still lost money.

== Accidents ==
Early in the operation of the line, a fatality occurred on 9 October 1891, when a partially-deaf 85-year-old man, William Russell, was hit at the Larkhill crossing by the 05:20 from Kemble "literally cutting him to pieces, scattering his members about the line in horrible dissection". Later that year a man was crushed to death by a 4 tonnes (3.9 long tons; 4.4 short tons) stone boulder while trimming back the rock cutting in Tetbury station yard. In June 1900, Olive Mitchell, the proprietress of a Tetbury grocer's shop, threw herself in front of a goods train at Kemble while returning from a stay in Gloucester Lunatic Asylum.

Soon after World War II, when there were still enough servicemen in the area to warrant the use of a NAAFI wagon to deliver supplies to Tetbury, one such wagon was pushed through the goods shed doors by its unattended engine.

== Closure ==
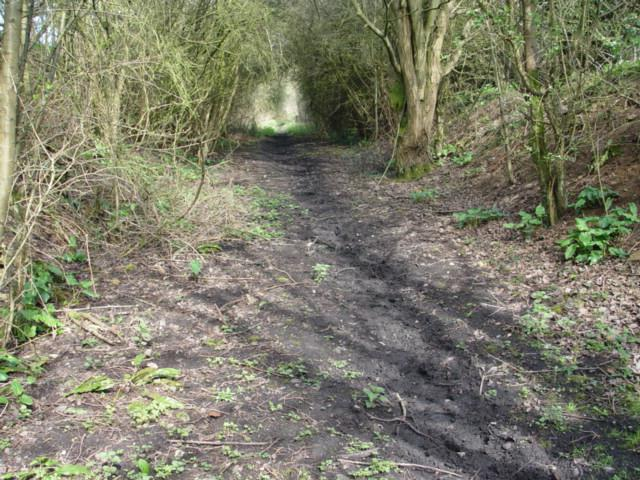
Part of the disused trackbed near the Trouble House Inn in 2005.

Following the Beeching Report of 1963, the line was earmarked for closure. The goods service on the line was discontinued on 4 August 1963. The last scheduled passenger train ran on 4 April 1964, when protesters blocked the line with burning hay bales and a coffin was put on the train at Trouble House Halt addressed to Richard Beeching. A steam-hauled special ran on the line on 5 April 1964; it was organised by the Gloucester Railway Society.

In July 1964 contractors began lifting the track and the process was completed by the autumn. In the early 1970s, the station and engine shed were demolished. British Rail retained the land at Tetbury, and the goods shed was rented out and used as a warehouse by coal merchants and a tyre company, until it was sold to Tetbury Town Council in the mid-1990s.

Following the intervention of Charles, Prince of Wales, the Tetbury Rail Lands Regeneration Trust was established in 1996 to make best community use of the disused rail land. A recent project by the trust has been the establishment of the Tetbury Trail as a footpath and bridleway along the former trackbed. Work continues on creating new ramps where old bridges have been demolished and establishing rights of way over privately owned land.

== Locations ==
- Kemble; main line station; opened 1 May 1882; still open;
- Jackaments Bridge Halt; opened 3 July 1939; closed 27 September 1948;
- Rodmarton platform; opened 1 September 1904; closed 6 April 1964;
- Church's Hill Halt; opened 2 February 1959; closed 6 April 1964;
- Culkerton; opened 2 December 1889; closed 5 March 1956; reopened 2 February 1959; closed 6 April 1964;
- Trouble House Halt; opened 2 February 1959; closed 6 April 1964;
- Tetbury; opened 2 December 1889; closed 6 April 1964.
