= Tetbury railway station =

Former railway station in England

Coordinates: 51.6363°N 2.1558°W

Tetbury
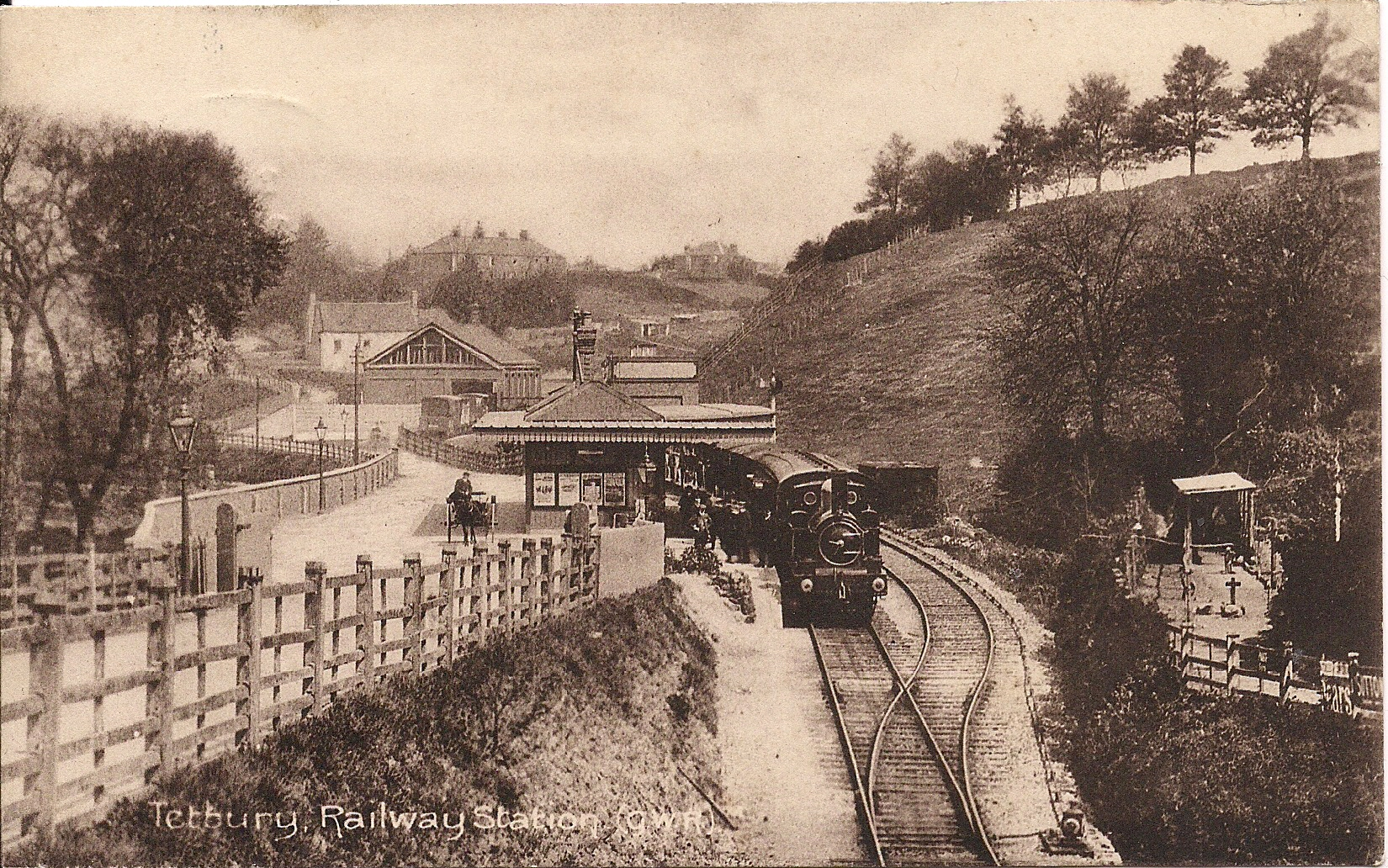

General information
- Location: Tetbury, Cotswold; England
- Platforms: 1

Other information
- Status: Disused

History
- Original company: Great Western Railway
- Pre-grouping: Great Western Railway
- Post-grouping: Great Western Railway

Key dates
- 1889: opened
- 1964: closed
Location

Tetbury railway station was the terminus station on the Tetbury branch line, serving the Gloucestershire town of Tetbury.

== History ==
The station was a typical Great Western Railway building, with a wide canopy stretching across the platform. The original station building was constructed from wood. By 1913 it was in need of rebuilding and was completed in brick over the next 3 years.

In 1908, confusion between Tetbury railway station and Tetbury Road railway station 6 1/2 miles (10.5 km) north-east on the Cheltenham and Great Western Union Railway) led to the latter being renamed Coates railway station. Prior to the name change, both stations had taken erroneous delivery of the other's goods.

In 1926, the use of the station's signal box was discontinued when the points began to be operated from a ground frame by the engineman. In 1930, the platform was extended to allow horses to be transported to and from the Beaufort Polo Club in nearby Westonbirt.

In 1963, an entire Tetbury farm – complete with machinery, foodstuffs, staff and pedigree herd of Hereford cattle – was transported from the station to Stranraer in 31 vehicles.

On 4 April 1964, the Tetbury branch line was closed as part of the Beeching Axe. The railway line and main station building were later demolished, with sleepers being used in pathways. The area was subsequently converted into a car park. In 2016 the Staffordshire blue brick goods shed was converted into an arts centre in a joint programme by Tetbury Town Council and Tetbury Rail Lands Regeneration Trust (TRLRT).

=== Stationmasters ===
- 1889–1900 – John William Boyd (afterwards station master at Kemble)
- 1900–1908 – Edward James Faulkner (afterwards station master at Brimscombe)
- 1908–1917 – Henry F. Hawker (formerly station master at Newent, afterwards station master at Stonehouse)
- 1917–1928 – G. A. R. Johns (afterwards station master at Lydney)
- 1928–1932 – Alexander Brinkworth
- 1932–? – R. Stephens
- 1935–1949 – Henry Harris (afterwards station master at Llandilo)

== Use ==
The line's primary economy was livestock. A cattle market was built adjacent to the station, and the line's freight generally consisted of food for livestock, milk, and coal. The Gloucestershire–Wiltshire border was such that livestock would pass from one county to another on entering the station – with different swine fever regulations in place between the counties, the station would experience lengthy delays before livestock could be trucked into and out of the station.

== Route ==
Preceding station	Disused railways	Following station
Trouble House Halt; Line and station closed	Great Western Railway; Tetbury branch line	Terminus
