= Park Leaze Halt railway station =

Former railway station in England

Park Leaze Halt

General information
- Location: Ewen, Cotswold; England
- Coordinates: 51.6875°N 1.9906°W
- Grid reference: SU007987
- Platforms: 1

Other information
- Status: Disused

History
- Original company: Western Region of British Railways

Key dates
- 4 January 1960: Station opened
- 6 April 1964: Station closed
Location

Park Leaze Halt railway station was one of two intermediate halts on the Cirencester branch line from Kemble, Gloucestershire, England. It was one of the shortest-lived stations in post-World War II Britain, being open for just over four years, between 1960 and 1964.

== History ==
The branch line to Cirencester had opened on 31 May 1841, but no intermediate stations were provided east of the junction at Kemble until the introduction of Diesel railbuses on the line in February 1959, when the small station of Chesterton Lane Halt was opened; less than a year later, on 4 January 1960, a second small station named Park Leaze Halt was opened.

There was a single low platform, on the down side (north) of the line and on the Cirencester side of an overbridge; the platform was constructed from sleepers, and there was no shelter. The station was 92 miles 42 chains (148.9 km) from Paddington. With the opening of this halt, the railcar service between Kemble and Cirencester increased from 13 to 14 in each direction on weekdays (three more ran on Saturdays). The halt served an area of farmland, the immediate population being approximately 20. The nearest village was Ewen, but the distance from Ewen to Kemble was not much more than to Park Leaze Halt, so the halt was only useful for Ewen residents if they were visiting Cirencester.

The halt closed with the end of passenger services on the Cirencester Town branch on 6 April 1964, the last trains having run on the evening of 5 April.

== Notes ==
Preceding station	Disused railways	Following station
Chesterton Lane Halt; Line and station closed	Western Region of British Railways; Cirencester Branch Line	Kemble; Line closed, station open
