= Tetbury Road railway station =

Former railway station in Gloucestershire, England

Tetbury Road
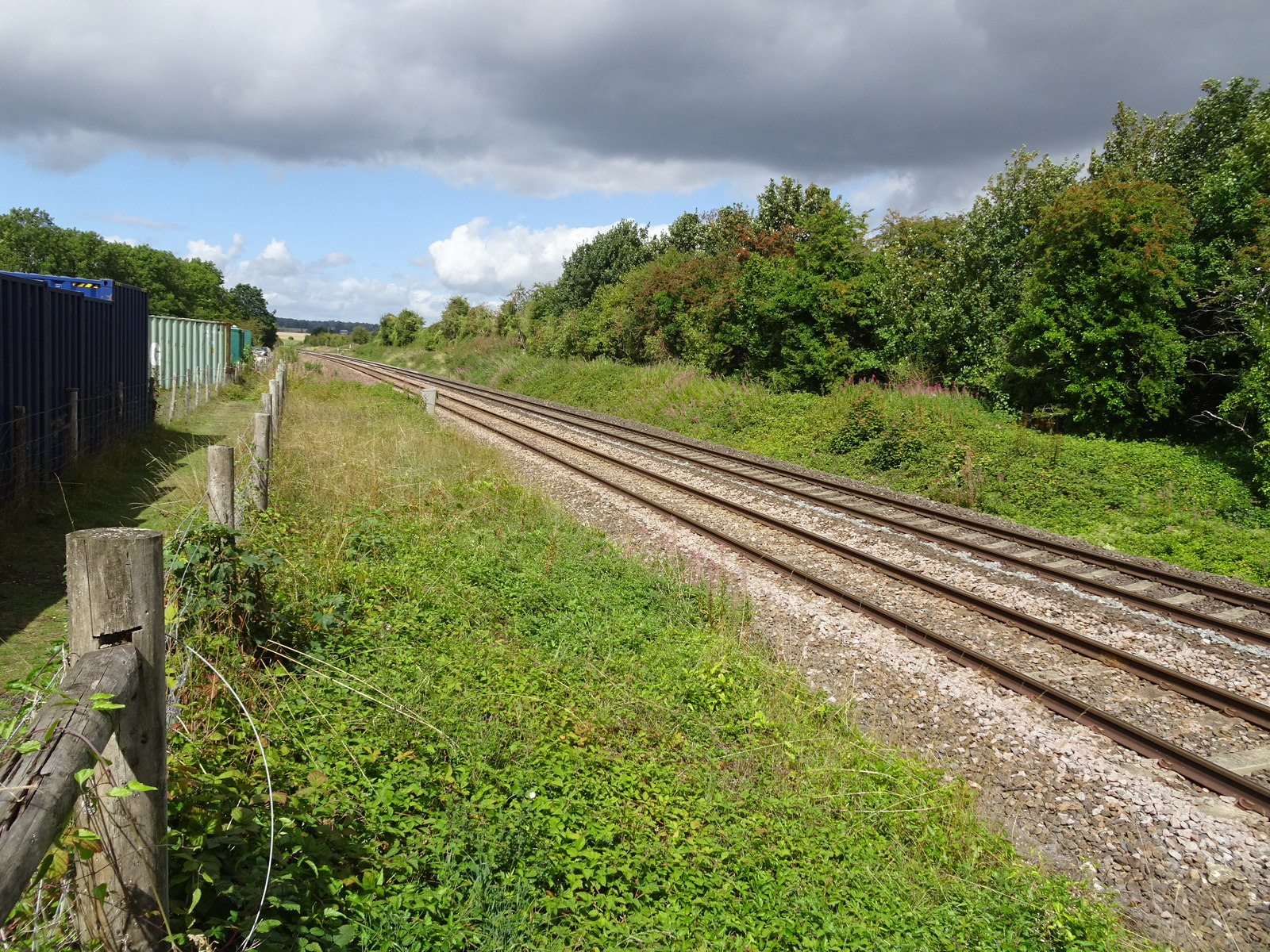
- The site of the station in 2018

General information
- Location: Coates, Cotswold, England
- Coordinates: 51.6880°N 2.0284°W
- Grid reference: ST981987

Other information
- Status: Disused

History
- Opened: 12 May 1845
- Closed: 1 May 1882
- Original company: Cheltenham & Great Western Union Railway
- Pre-grouping: Great Western Railway

Key dates
- 12 May 1845: Opened as Tetbury Road
- 1 May 1882: Closed to passengers
- 1 May 1908: Renamed Coates
- 1 July 1963: Closed to freight
Location

Tetbury Road railway station served Kemble, Coates and Tetbury, in Gloucestershire, England. It was built by the Cheltenham & Great Western Union Railway, operating between 1845 and 1963.

== History ==
The station was situated on the Golden Valley Line, to the north of the bridge where the line passes over the Fosse Way. The site was carefully chosen so as to be outside the land around Kemble, which was owned by Robert Gordon who forbade the construction of a public station on his land.

The Cheltenham & Great Western Union Railway (C&GWU) had been authorised on 21 June 1836 to build a line from a junction with the Great Western Railway (GWR) at Swindon to Cheltenham Spa, via Kemble, with a branch from the latter point to Cirencester Town. The first section of the C&GWU from Swindon to Cirencester opened on 31 May 1841; there were no stations between Minety and Cirencester.

A junction was later constructed at Kemble and, with it, the line from there to Gloucester was opened on 12 May 1845; the first station on the new line was at Tetbury Road. A station was also built at the junction, but this had no road access, being intended for interchange purposes. In the meantime, the C&GWU had been purchased by the GWR on 1 July 1843.

During the conversion of the Cirencester branch from 7 ft 1/4 in (2,140 mm) to standard gauge, which took place between 22 and 27 May 1872, Cirencester passengers used Tetbury Road station; they were conveyed between the station and Cirencester by omnibus.

When road access to Kemble station was provided from 1 May 1882, Tetbury Road was closed to passengers. It remained open for goods and was renamed Coates on 1 May 1908, to prevent goods intended for Tetbury from being sent here by mistake; the Tetbury branch having opened for passengers and goods on December 1889. The station closed completely on 1 July 1963.

Preceding station	Historical railways	Following station
Chalford; Line open, station closed	Great Western Railway; Cheltenham & Great Western Union Railway	Kemble; Line and station open

== The site today ==
The line remains open for passenger services between Swindon and Cheltenham Spa, but no traces of the station remain.
