= Kemble railway station =

Railway station in Gloucestershire, England

Kemble
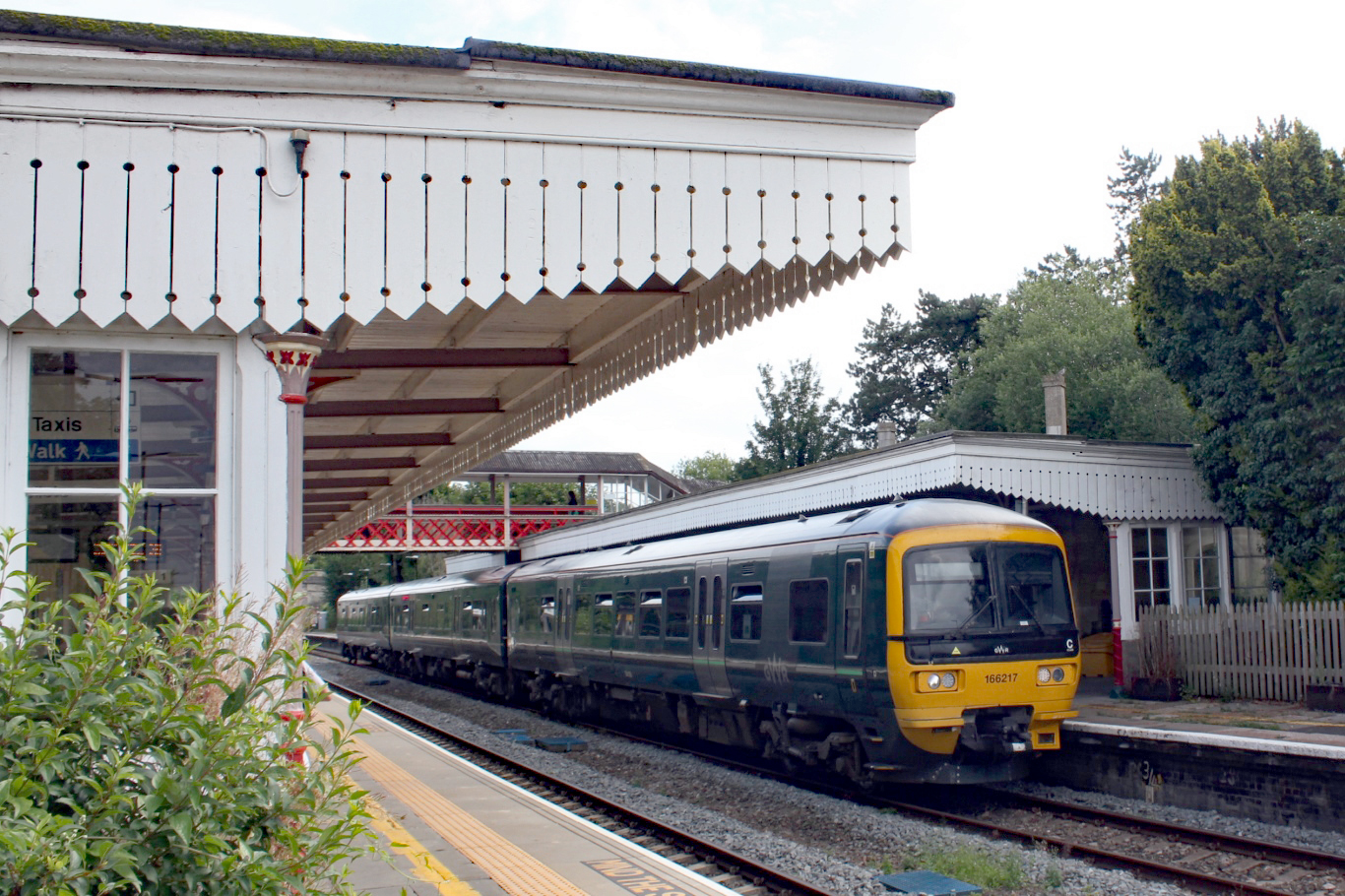
- Kemble station

General information
- Location: Kemble, Gloucestershire, England
- Coordinates: 51°40′34″N 2°01′23″W
- Grid reference: ST985975
- Manager: Great Western Railway
- Platforms: 2

Other information
- Station code: KEM
- Classification: DfT category D

History
- Original company: Great Western Railway

Key dates
- 1882: Opened
- 1964: Tetbury branch closed
- 1964: Cirencester branch closed

Passengers
- 2021/22: ▲0.259 million
- 2022/23: ▲0.353 million
- 2023/24: ▲0.400 million
- 2024/25: ▲0.445 million
- 2025/26: ▲0.477 million
Location
Notes
- Passenger statistics from the Office of Rail and Road

Kemble railway station serves the village of Kemble, in Gloucestershire, England. It is a stop on the Swindon to Gloucester Golden Valley line, 90 miles 79 chains (146.4 km) down the line from London Paddington. Despite its rural location, Kemble station has a high number of passengers due mainly to the proximity of Cirencester.

== History ==
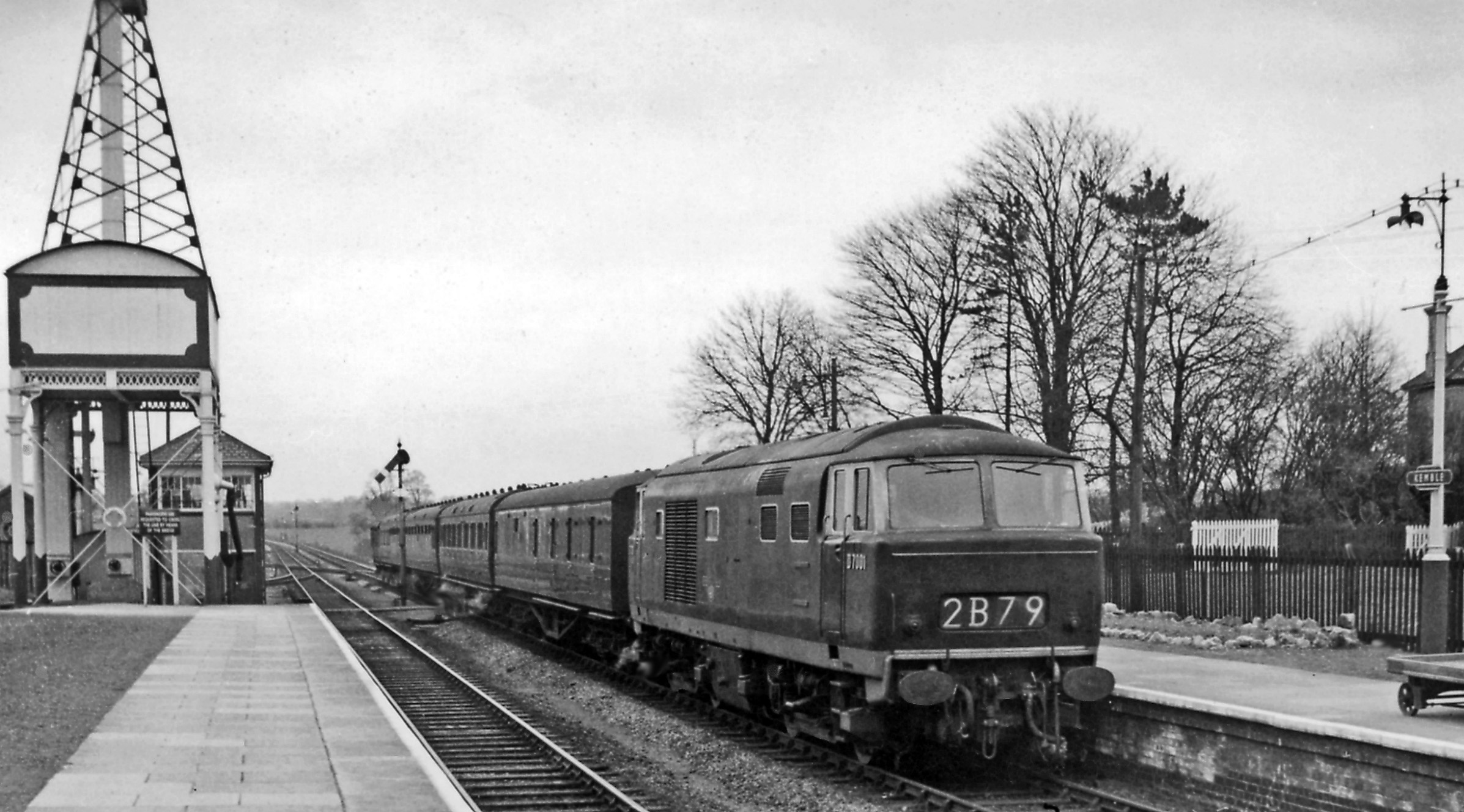
Diesel-hauled up stopping train in 1962

The station was opened by the Great Western Railway (GWR) as an exchange station on 12 May 1845 with the line opening from Swindon to Gloucester. Only on 1 May 1882 did it become a public station, replacing the nearby Tetbury Road.

The distance between the platforms and the large clearance between the remaining running lines is a legacy from when Kemble first opened because it originally accommodated Brunel's 7 ft 1/4 in (2,140 mm) broad gauge tracks. These were changed to standard gauge tracks in 1892.

Until the 1960s, the station was a junction, with services to the nearby market towns of Cirencester (to the north-east) and Tetbury (south-west). Both the Tetbury branch line and the Cirencester Branch Line were closed to traffic under The Reshaping of British Railways, the first day without service being 6 April 1964.

British Rail reduced the line to Swindon to single track in 1968, but the second track was reinstated in 2014.

=== Stationmasters ===
- Jeremiah Greenaway ca. 1869 – 1900
- John William Boyd 1900 – 1922 (formerly station master at Tetbury)
- G. Evans 1922 – 1929 (formerly station master at Purton)
- M.E. Waters until 1935 (also station master at Cirencester Town, afterwards station master at Cirencester Town)
- C. Feldwick. 1935 – 1942 (afterwards station master at Cirencester Town)
- Walter John Butt Watts from 1942 (formerly station master at Brimscombe)

== Description ==
The station has two platforms in use. The former Tetbury-bound platform remains but the track has been lifted. The building on the down platform (no. 2) has been out of use for several years; it contains toilets and a waiting room, which are still in situ. On the former Cirencester platform, a short stub of track remains for the occasional stabling of track machines. This ends at a buffer stop just before the station car park.

In 2013, Cotswold District Council refused an application by Network Rail to demolish part of the Grade II listed Cirencester bay platform in connection with the redoubling of the line from Swindon. According to the council, the platform was still in a good state of repair and any public benefit from the demolition would not outweigh the damage that would be caused to the historical significance of the station.

The station has a ticket office and a small café. The limestone bridge, at the south end of the station, was Grade II listed from 5 November 2015, with the station and water tank from 27 February 1986.

== Services ==
Great Western Railway operates all services at Kemble using mainly Class 800 bi-mode trains.

The typical off-peak service in trains per hour is:

- 1 tph to London Paddington
- 1 tph to Cheltenham Spa via Gloucester

The station is also served by limited services extending beyond Cheltenham Spa to Worcester Shrub Hill. There is also a limited service to/from Westbury via the Wessex Main Line.

The station is occasionally served by trains to and from Cardiff Central and Swansea during periods of engineering work.

| Preceding station | National Rail | Following station |
|---|---|---|
| Swindon | Great Western Railway Golden Valley line | Stroud |
| | Historical railways | |
| Tetbury Road; Line open, station closed | Great Western Railway; Cheltenham and Great Western Union Railway | Minety and Ashton Keynes; Line open, station closed |
| Terminus | Great Western Railway; Cheltenham and Great Western Union Railway | Oaksey Halt; Line open, station closed |
| | Disused railways | |
| Park Leaze Halt; Line and station closed | Great Western Railway; Cirencester branch line | Terminus |
| Jackament's Bridge Halt; Line and station closed | Great Western Railway; Tetbury branch line | Terminus |

== Gallery ==
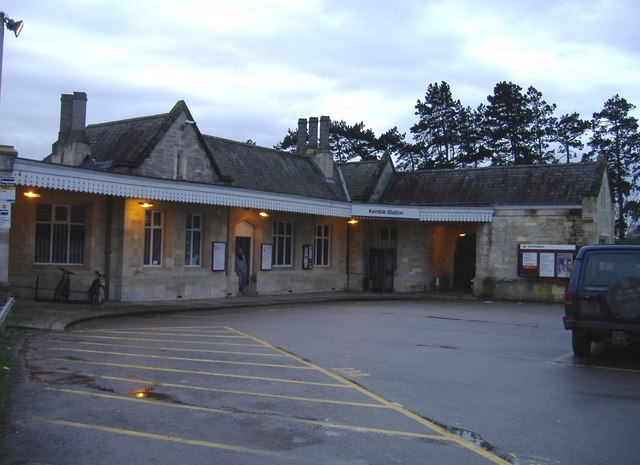
Station entrance

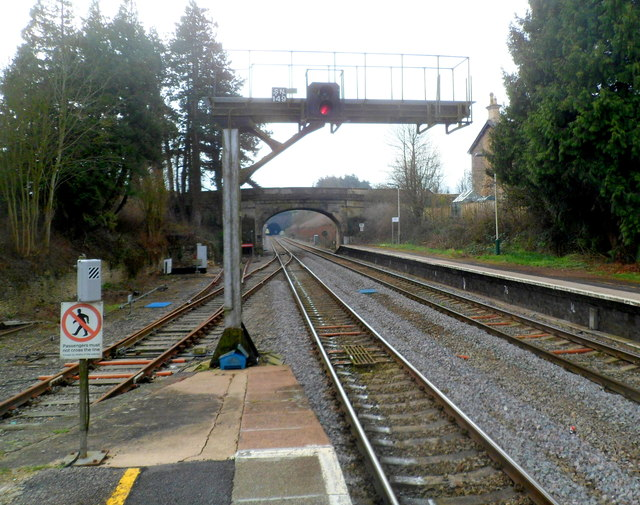
Signals at Kemble Station

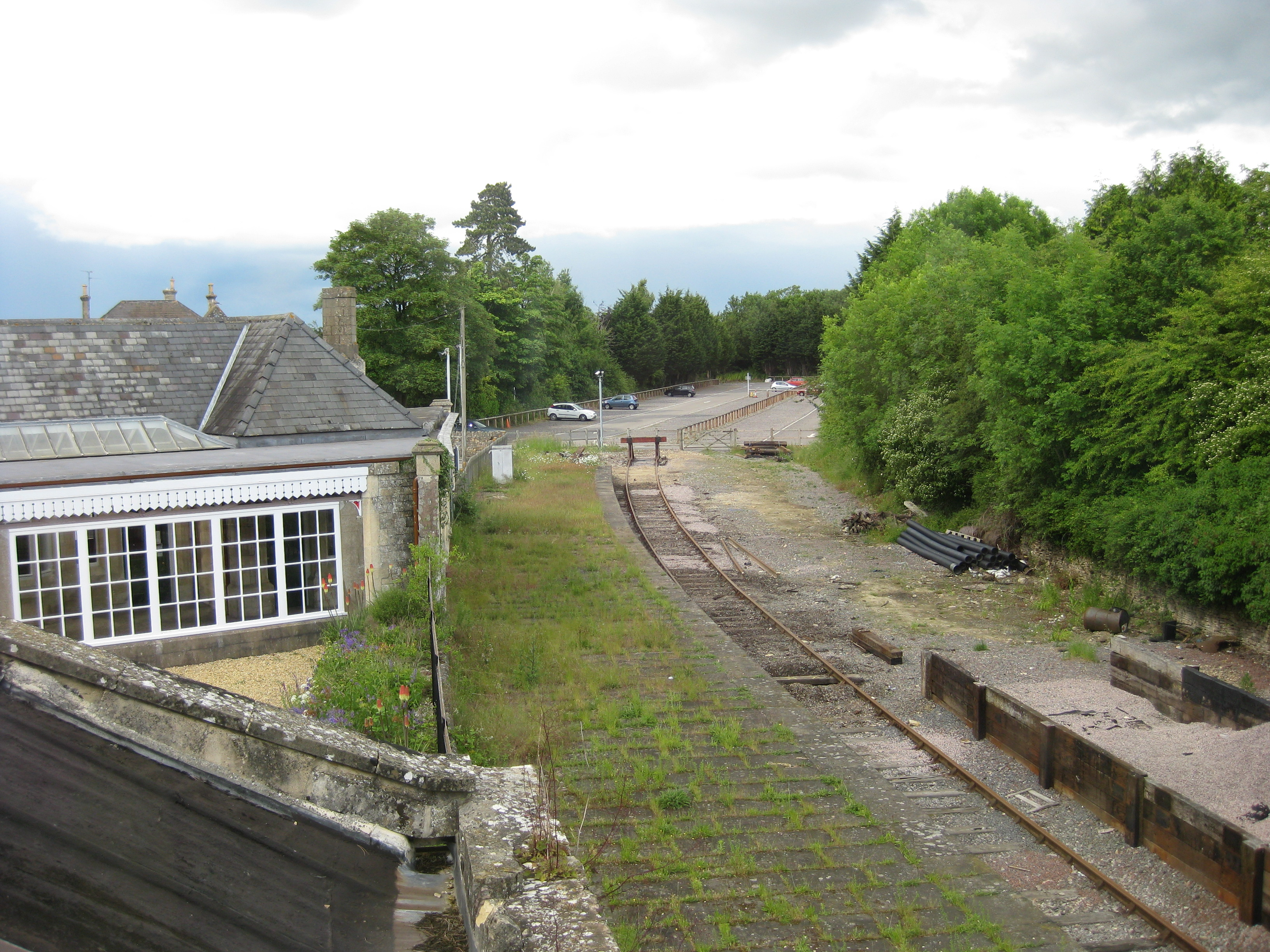
The former Cirencester platform, June 2009

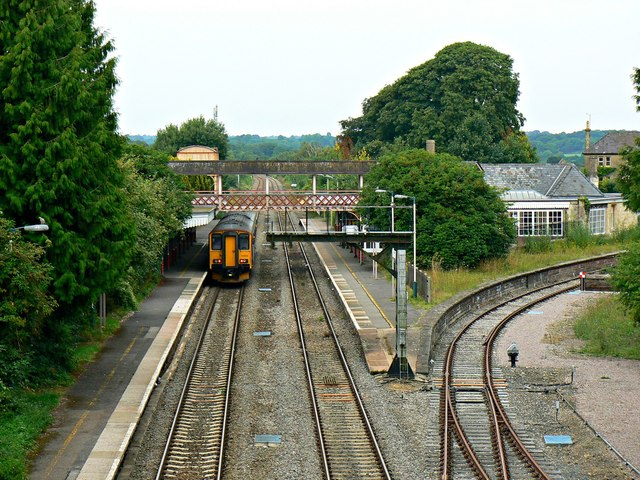
Station platforms looking north-west; the remnant of the Cirencester line branches to the right

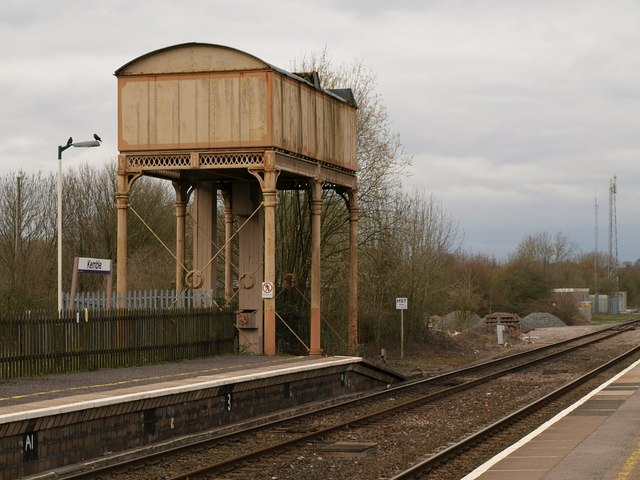
The Grade II listed water tank
