= Cirencester branch line =

Branch railway in Gloucestershire, England

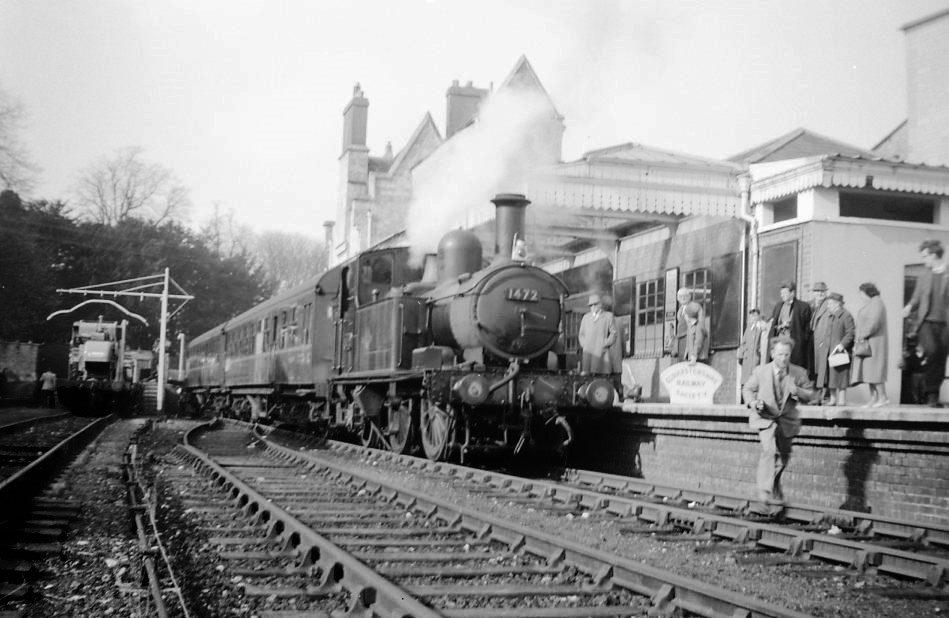
- A railtour at Cirencester Town station (1964)

Overview
- Status: Closed
- Owner: Cheltenham and Great Western Union Railway; Great Western Railway; Western Region of British Railways
- Locale: Gloucestershire, England
- Termini: Kemble, Cirencester Town
- Stations: 4

Service
- Type: Heavy rail

History
- Opened: 1841
- Closed: 1965

Technical
- Line length: 5 mi (8.0 km)
- Num of tracks: Two
- Track gauge: 4 ft 8 1/2 in (1,435 mm) standard gauge
- Electrification: No

The Cirencester branch line was a 5-mile (8 km)-long single-track branch railway line in Gloucestershire, England; it connected the market town of Cirencester to the main line at Kemble. It was opened by the Cheltenham and Great Western Union Railway (C&GWUR) in 1841. The main line was extended from Kemble to a junction near Gloucester in 1845 by the Great Western Railway (GWR), which had taken over the C&GWUR. The branch supported a busy passenger and goods business, but these declined in the 1930s and closure was threatened in the 1950s. To reduce costs and maintain the viability of the line, lightweight four-wheel diesel railbuses were introduced, and they proved popular. Nevertheless, the line's decline was inexorable; the line was closed to passenger services in 1964 and to goods in the following year.

== History ==
=== Cheltenham and Great Western Union Railway ===
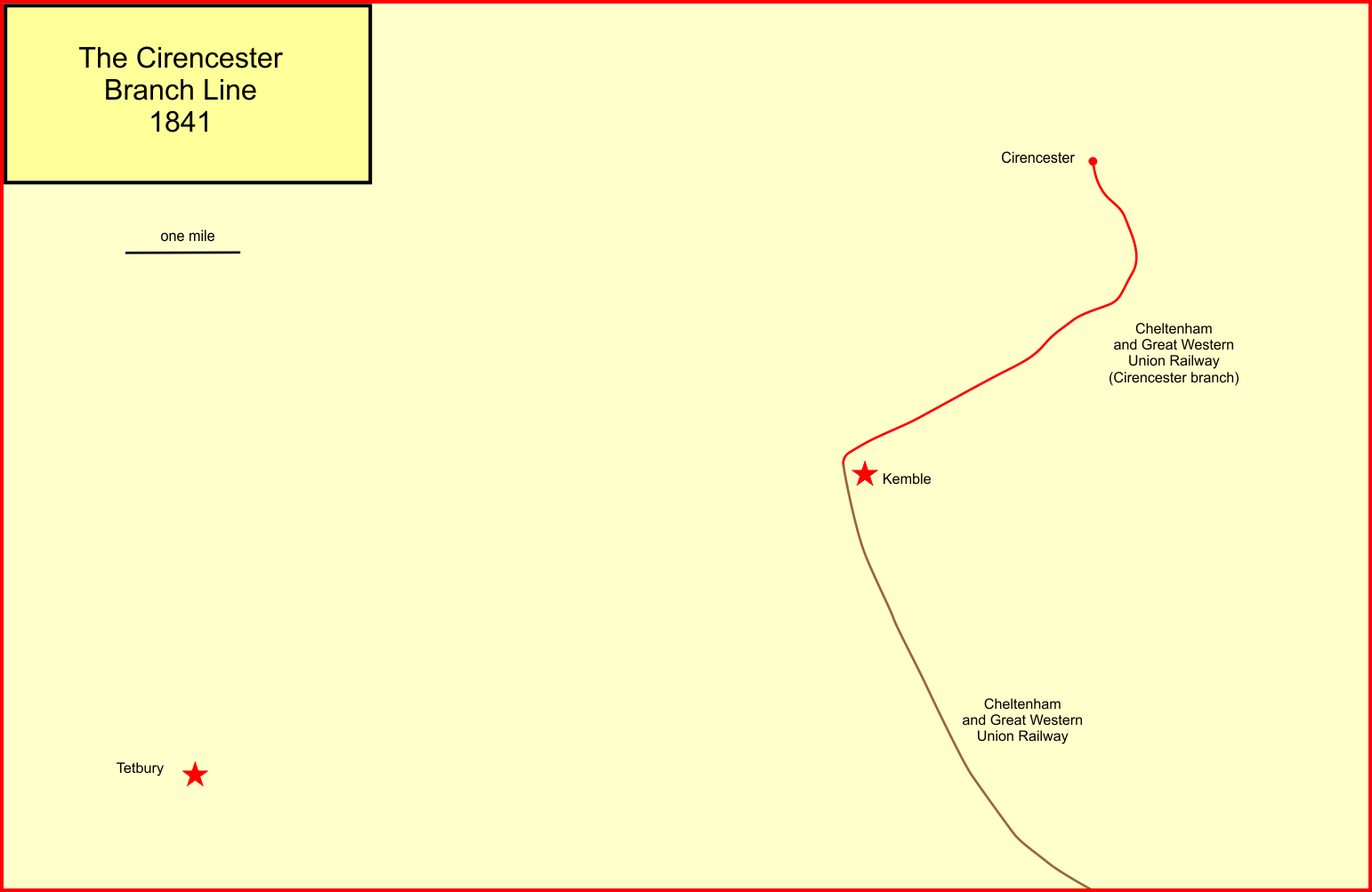
The Cirencester line in 1841

The Great Western Railway opened its main line between London and Bristol in 1841. During the construction period, an independent company called the Cheltenham and Great Western Union Railway obtained authorisation on 21 June 1836, in the Cheltenham and Great Western Union Railway Act 1836 (Note: 6 & 7 Will. 4. c. lxxvii), to make a line from the GWR at Swindon, to Cheltenham, via Stroud and Gloucester. The estimated cost of construction was £750,000.

As well as the main line between Swindon and Cheltenham, there was to be a branch to Cirencester, terminating at Botany Bay. A landowner at Kemble, named Robert Gordon, was evidently hostile to the railway and he secured clauses in the C&GWUR's authorising act of Parliament requiring a tunnel, not needed for engineering purposes, near to Kemble; the railway was forbidden to open a public station on Gordon's estate. The new line was to be on the broad gauge.

The money market was extremely depressed in the period following authorisation of the line and subscriptions could not be secured to make material progress on construction. In desperation, the directors determined to construct between Swindon and Cirencester only for the time being, for that would give the best chance of getting an income that would pay a dividend on the outlay. The company arranged a provisional lease with the Great Western Railway, in which the GWR would pay £17,000 annually for the use of the (as yet unbuilt) line.

The Bristol and Gloucester Railway was relying on timely completion of the C&GWUR at the Gloucester and Cheltenham end of the line; it obtained clauses in C&GWUR acts of Parliament pressuring the Cheltenham company to complete at the Gloucester end of the line, and the emphasis on early construction passed to that area. In November 1840, even that work proved impossible to finance and attention reverted to the Swindon end.

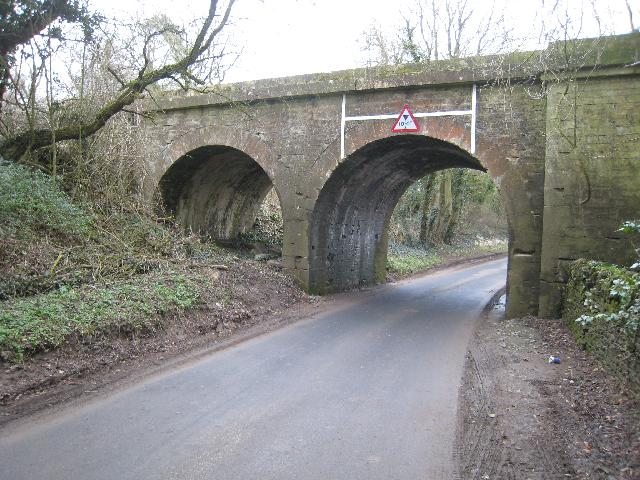
Bridge over the minor road to Ewen; to the left (west) was another bridge, which carried the railway over the Thames & Severn Canal

Progress was made eventually and the line opened between Swindon and Cirencester on 31 May 1841. It was a single broad gauge line; stations were at Purton, Minety and Cirencester, so there was no intermediate station on what was to be the branch line. The line was leased to the GWR as arranged, for a period of seven years.

=== Great Western Railway ===
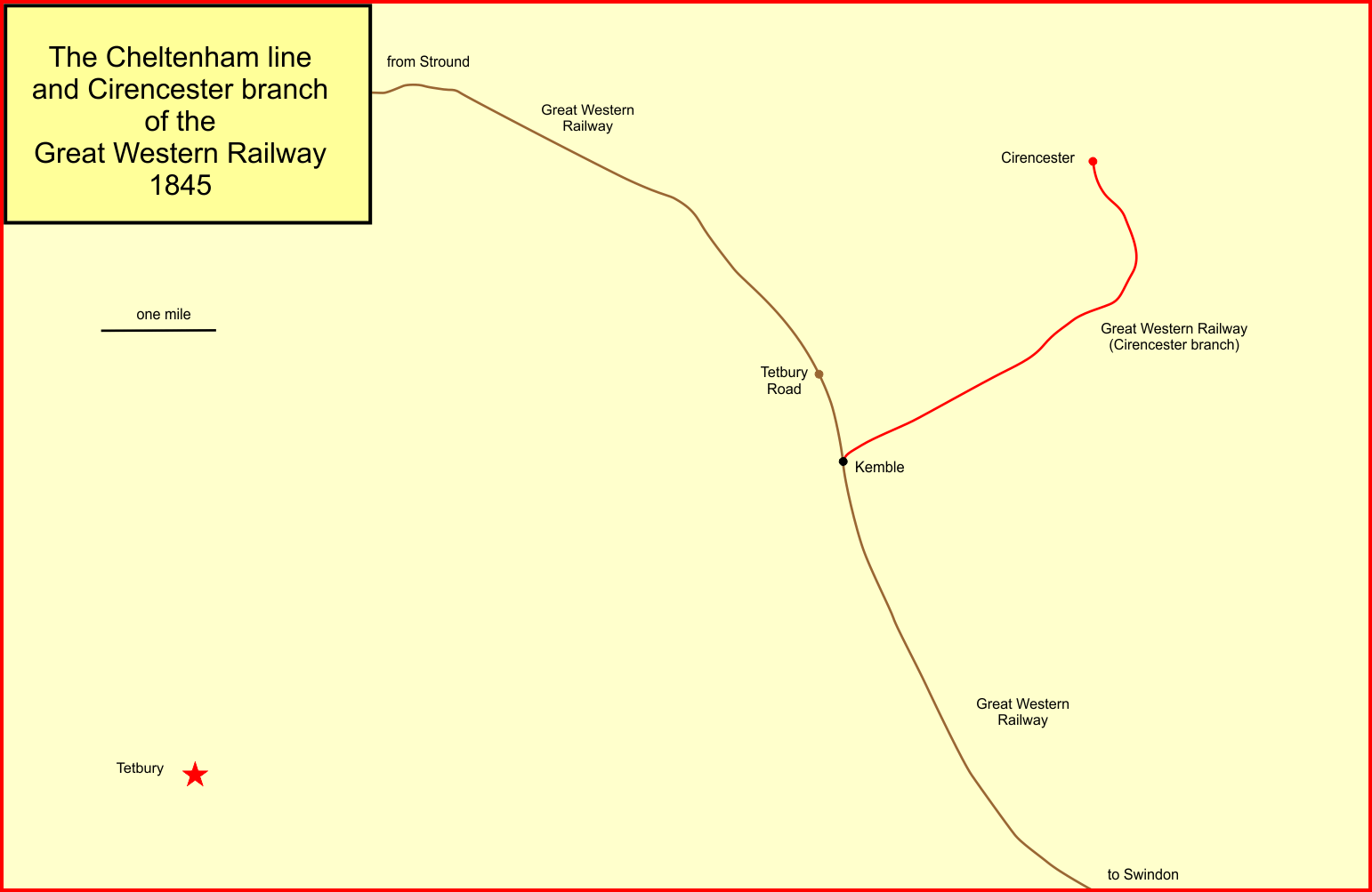
The Cirencester branch in 1845

In 1842, the C&GWUR obtained the Cheltenham and Great Western Union Railway Act 1842 (Note: 5 & 6 Vict. c. xxviii.) giving authorisation to sell their line to the GWR. The mainline company was not yet ready to purchase but, after a delay, the transfer was agreed in January 1843. The amalgamation took place on 1 July 1843; the GWR spent £230,000 in the acquisition of the line, which had so far cost the C&GWUR £600,000 to construct.

The GWR did not hasten to complete the line, but it opened from Kemble to Standish Junction, joining the Bristol line there on 12 May 1845. Kemble thus became the junction station for what was now the Cirencester branch. Gordon's restrictive clauses prevented the opening of a public station there and the GWR contented itself with an exchange station, not accessible for joining and leaving passengers or goods. Tetbury was served by Tetbury Road station, on the main line immediately north of the Cirencester to Tetbury road and just outside Gordon's estate. (Note: Near to the present-day Thames Head public house.) (Note: Vaughan comments that Kemble station never had a goods terminal; goods traffic was handled at Tetbury Road, later renamed Coates.)

=== Gauge conversion ===
The Cirencester branch had been opened as a broad gauge line. The GWR undertook a widespread conversion to narrow (standard) gauge in the general area in 1872; the Cirencester branch was closed on 22 May for the conversion work and reopened as a standard gauge line on 27 May. Passengers were conveyed by horse-drawn omnibus to and from Tetbury Road station during the closure.

=== Signalling improvements ===
In 1908, the Webb-Thompson electric train staff system was installed on the branch. The Cirencester line was controlled from Kemble East signal box and Cirencester; the former was demolished in 1929 and a new 62-lever box was installed. Due to the curvature of the platform at Kemble, there was an auxiliary staff instrument on the platform.

=== Diesel railbuses ===
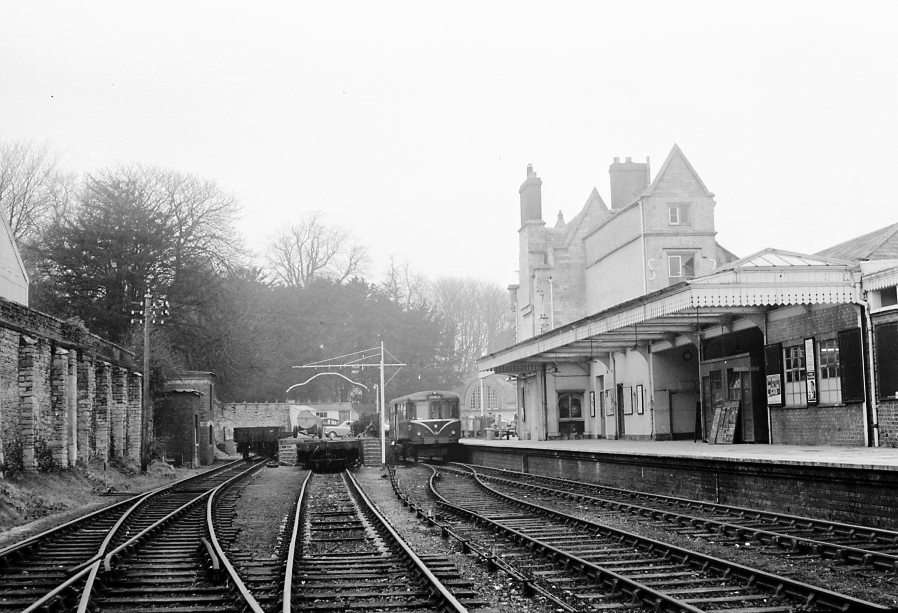
A diesel railbus at Cirencester Town station (1962)

In an attempt to save the line from closure, diesel railbuses were introduced on the line in February 1959 to reduce costs. The train service was increased to 14 trains per day; Chesterton Lane Halt was opened and Park Leaze Halt followed in January 1960.

Results were encouraging: 130,000 passengers yearly, an average of about 13 per train; the railbus was overcrowded, particularly on Saturdays. The original intention was to run railbuses through to Swindon to avoid a change of trains at Kemble, but this proved impossible as the lightweight vehicles did not reliably operate the signalling track circuits on the main line.

=== Closure ===
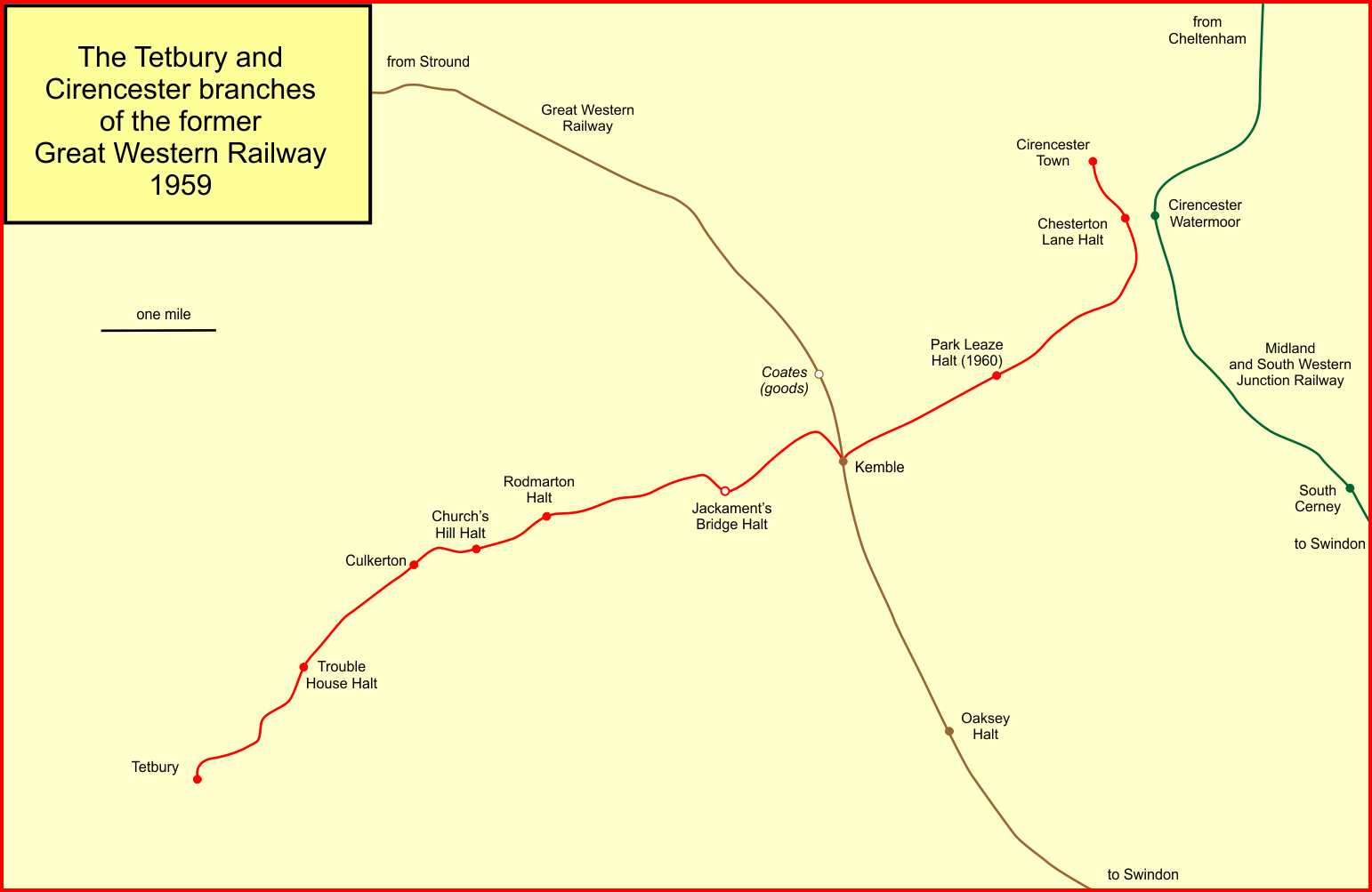
A map of the branch (1959)

Nevertheless, despite the initial success of the railbuses, the passenger service was not financially viable and it was withdrawn on 6 April 1964. Goods traffic was withdrawn on 4 October 1965.

== Stations ==
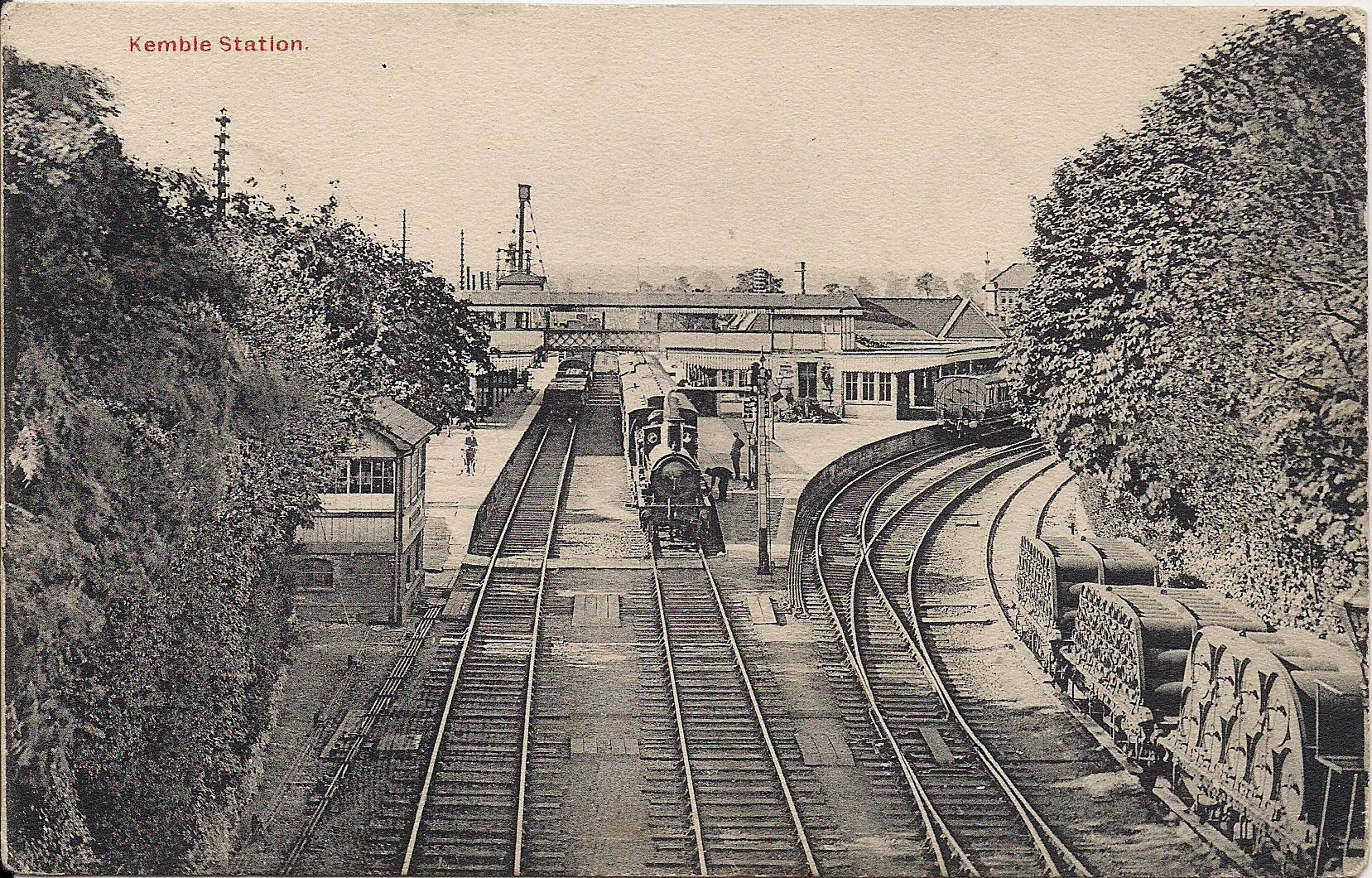
Kemble station before 1905; the Cirencester branch line is on the right

The four stations on the line were:

- Kemble: opened for exchange purposes only on 12 May 1845; opened to the public on 1 May 1882. The station is still open, on the Golden Valley line between Swindon and Gloucester
- Park Leaze Halt: opened on 4 January 1960; closed on 6 April 1964
- Chesterton Lane Halt: opened on 2 February 1959; closed on 6 April 1964
- Cirencester: opened on 31 May 1841; renamed Cirencester Town on 1 July 1924; closed on 6 April 1964. The station originally had an overall roof, but this was removed in 1874. In 1956, work was carried out towards renovation, but the work was suspended, leaving the buildings in a partly completed state.

== Service ==
The service on the line was as follows:

- 1922: there were ten trains daily, but no Sunday service
- 1936: there were 11 trains each way daily, with three goods trains
- 1954: the passenger service was reduced to nine trains daily.

== The route today ==
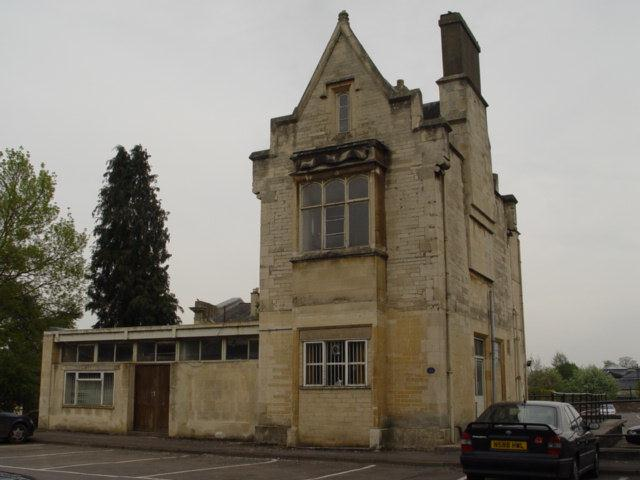
Remains of Cirencester Town station (2006)

Cirencester's ring road was built on part of the railway in the mid-1970s, which has made reopening a railway to Cirencester Town station unlikely and costly.

== Future plans ==
A community railway project is campaigning to rebuild the line between Cirencester and Kemble, therefore reconnecting the area to the National Rail network. The plans would see a new station built near Chesterton Lane Halt.

In January 2019, the Campaign for Better Transport identified the line as Priority 2 for reopening; this category was for those lines requiring further development or a change in circumstances, such as housing developments.

Two bids for feasibility study funding were made to the Department for Transport's Restoring your Railway fund in March and June 2020; the second was successful.

In January 2023, the project team bid for a final tranche of funding for a feasibility study.
