= Cirencester Town railway station =

Former railway station in Gloucestershire, England

Cirencester Town
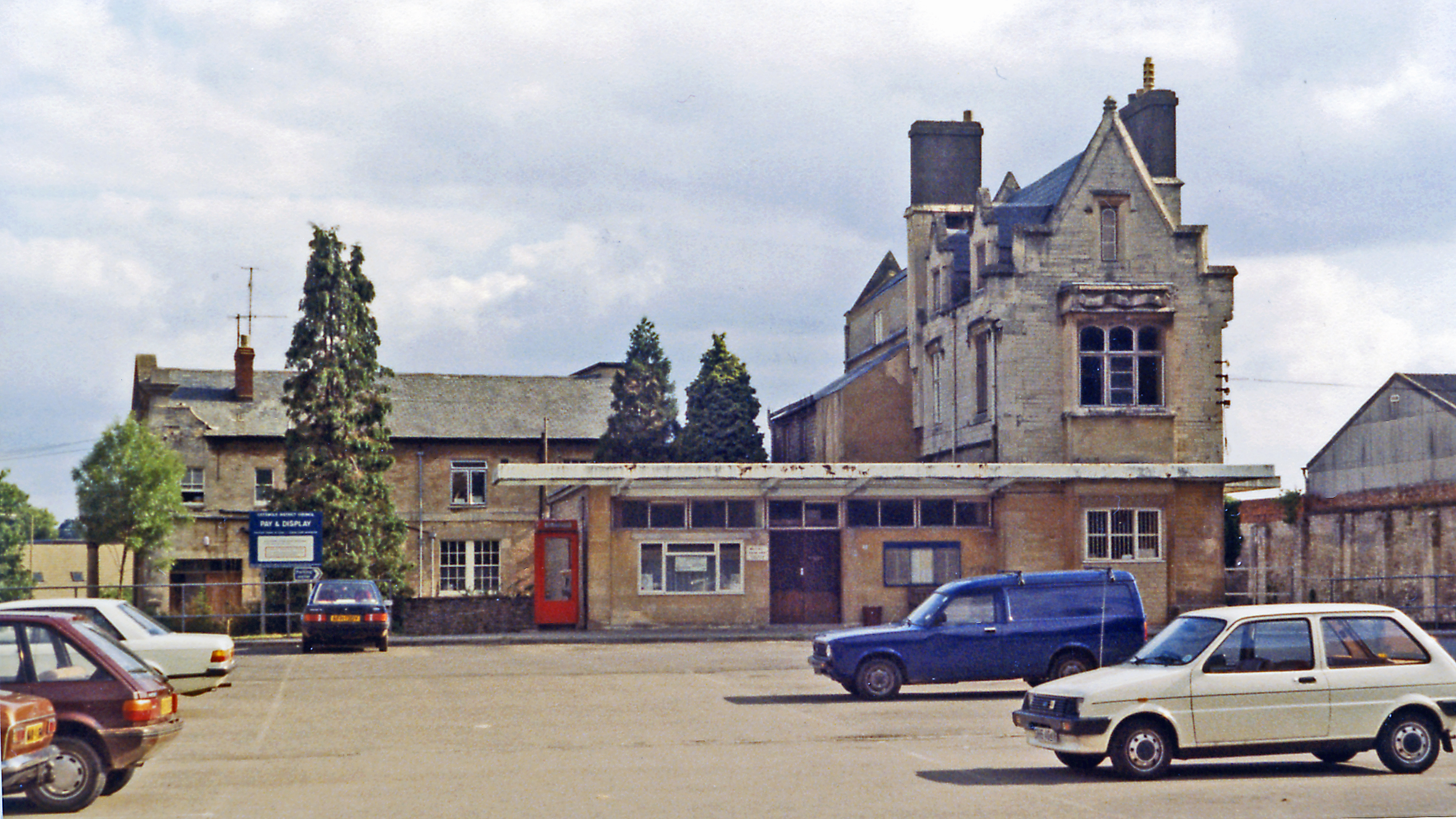
- Remaining station frontage, 1984

General information
- Location: Cirencester, Gloucestershire, England
- Coordinates: 51.7145°N 1.9717°W
- Grid reference: SP020017
- Platforms: 1

Other information
- Status: Disused

History
- Original company: Cheltenham and Great Western Union Railway
- Pre-grouping: Great Western Railway
- Post-grouping: Great Western Railway

Key dates
- 31 May 1841: Opened as Cirencester
- 1 July 1924: Renamed Cirencester Town
- 6 April 1964: Closed for passengers
- 4 October 1965: Closed for freight

Listed Building – Grade II
- Official name: Former railway station, Sheep Street
- Designated: 23 July 1971
- Reference no.: 1187518
Location

Cirencester Town was one of three railway stations which formerly served the town of Cirencester, in Gloucestershire, England; the others were Cirencester Watermoor and Chesterton Lane Halt.

== History ==
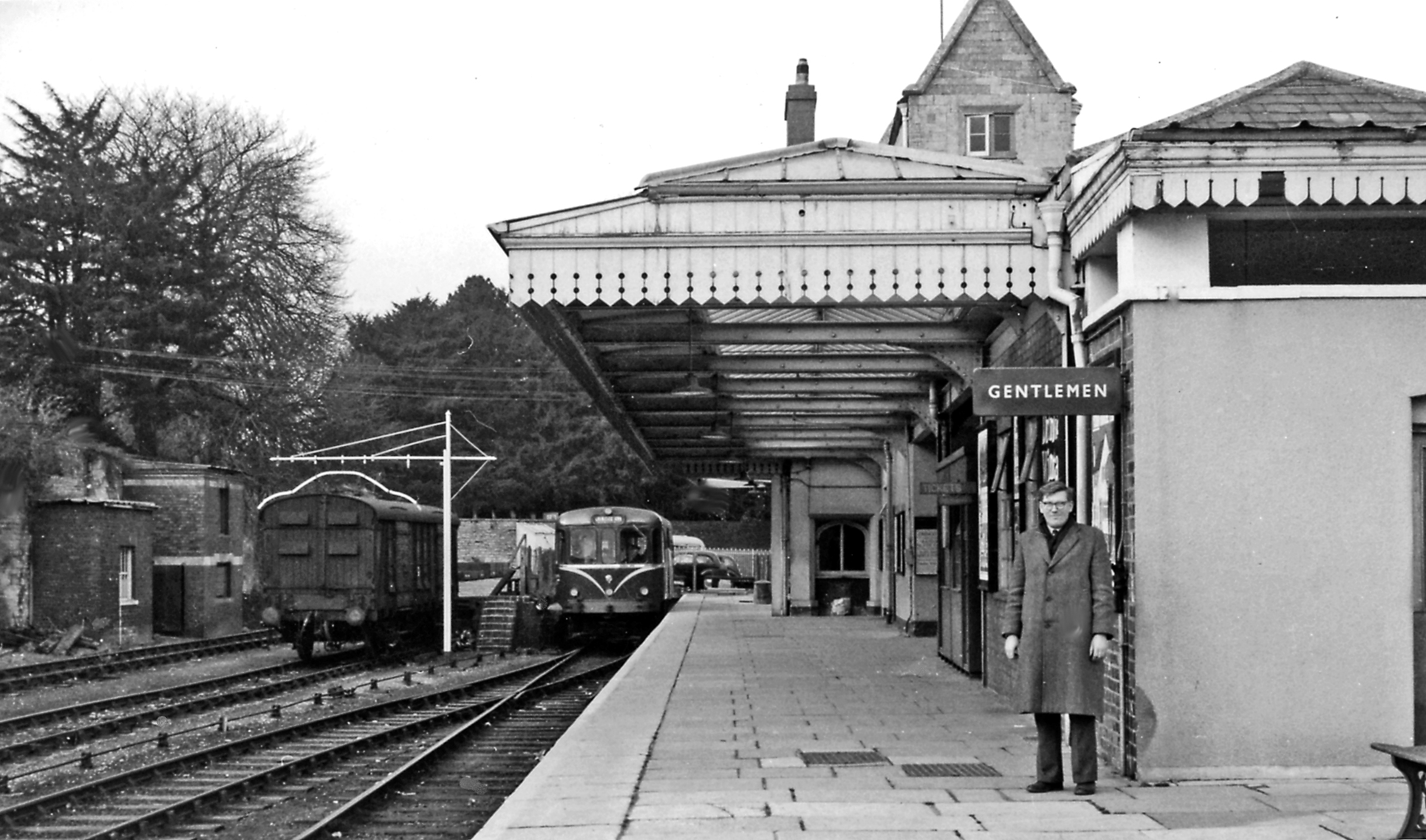
View northward to buffer stops, 1962

The Cheltenham and Great Western Union Railway was promoted to link the towns of Cheltenham and Gloucester to the Great Western Railway at Swindon; there was to be a branch from Kemble to Cirencester. The line was authorised on 21 June 1836, but took several years to build. The first section to open was that between Swindon and Kemble (where there was no station at first) together with the Cirencester branch; it opened on 31 May 1841.

On 12 September 1874, as the first train from Kemble Junction was entering the station, the locomotive ran off the rails. No passengers were injured.

On 1 July 1924, the station was renamed Cirencester Town. A fire broke out on 7 April 1948 in the packing office, when a stove pipe overheated and ignited the ceiling joists. The damage was confined to ceiling timbers. In 1956, some additions to the station were made by Howard Cavanagh, architect to the Western Region of British Railways. The ticket hall to the left of the main building was rebuilt using Bath stone and oak window frames to harmonise with the original.

The station closed to passengers on 6 April 1964.

Preceding station	Disused railways	Following station
Terminus	Great Western Railway; Cirencester Branch Line	Chesterton Lane Halt; Line and station closed

== The site today ==
The 1841 building, which was designed by Brunel and was listed as Grade II on 23 July 1971, is now owned by Cotswold District Council. It was reported to be in a poor internal condition in 2016, having been empty since 2012. The original overall roof was removed in 1874.
