= Slough–Windsor & Eton line =

Railway branch line in Berkshire, England

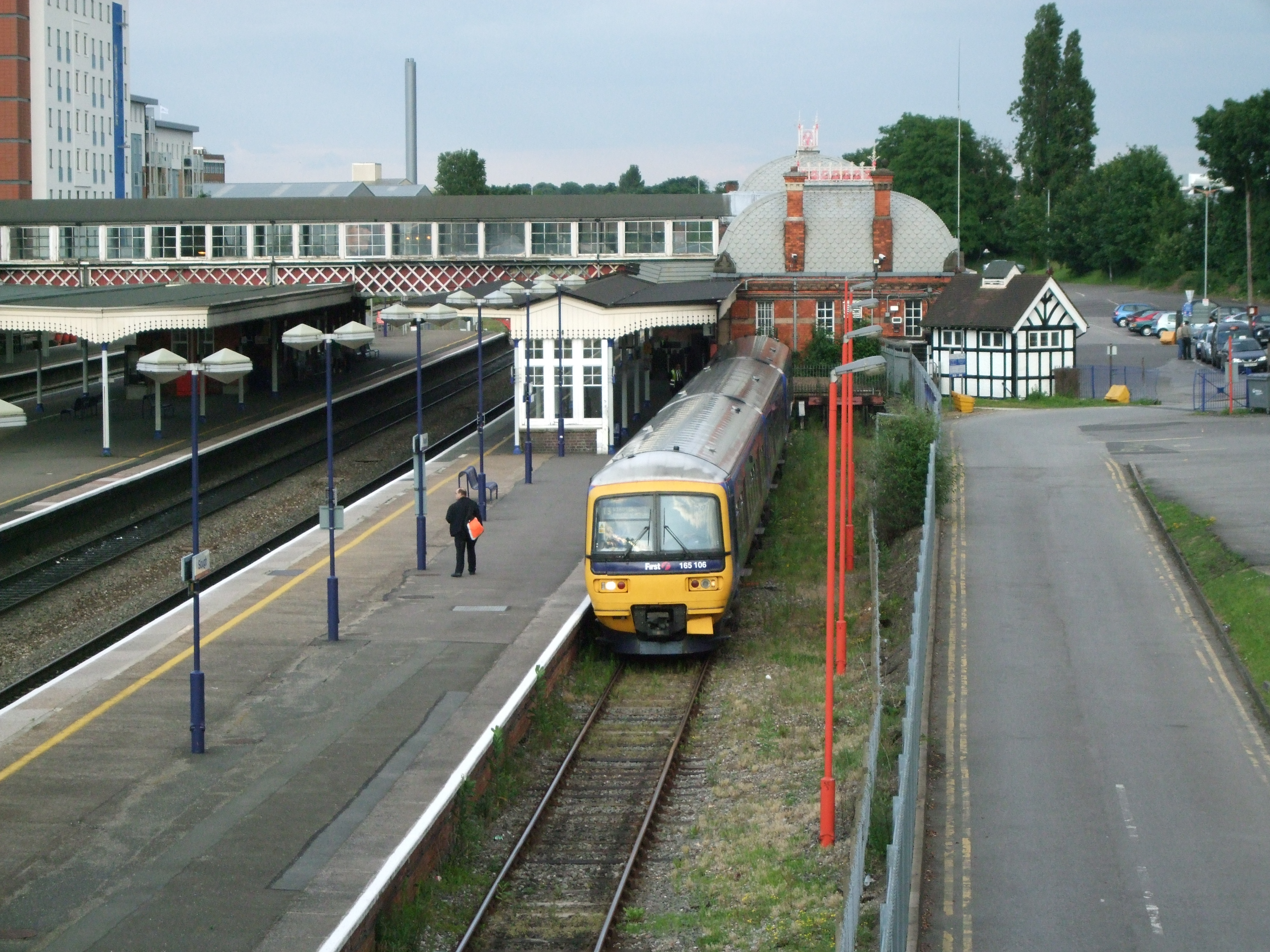
- The "Windsor bay" (Platform 1) at Slough, with a Class 165 DMU waiting to depart

Overview
- Status: Operational
- Owner: Network Rail
- Locale: Berkshire; South East England
- Termini: Slough; Windsor & Eton Central
- Stations: 2

Service
- Type: Heavy rail
- System: National Rail
- Operator: Great Western Railway
- Rolling stock: Class 165 "Turbo"; Class 166 "Turbo Express"

History
- Opened: 1849

Technical
- Track length: 2 miles 63 chains (4.5 km)
- Number of tracks: Single track
- Character: Branch Line
- Track gauge: 1,435 mm (4 ft 8 1/2 in) standard gauge
- Operating speed: 50 mph (80 km/h)
Route map
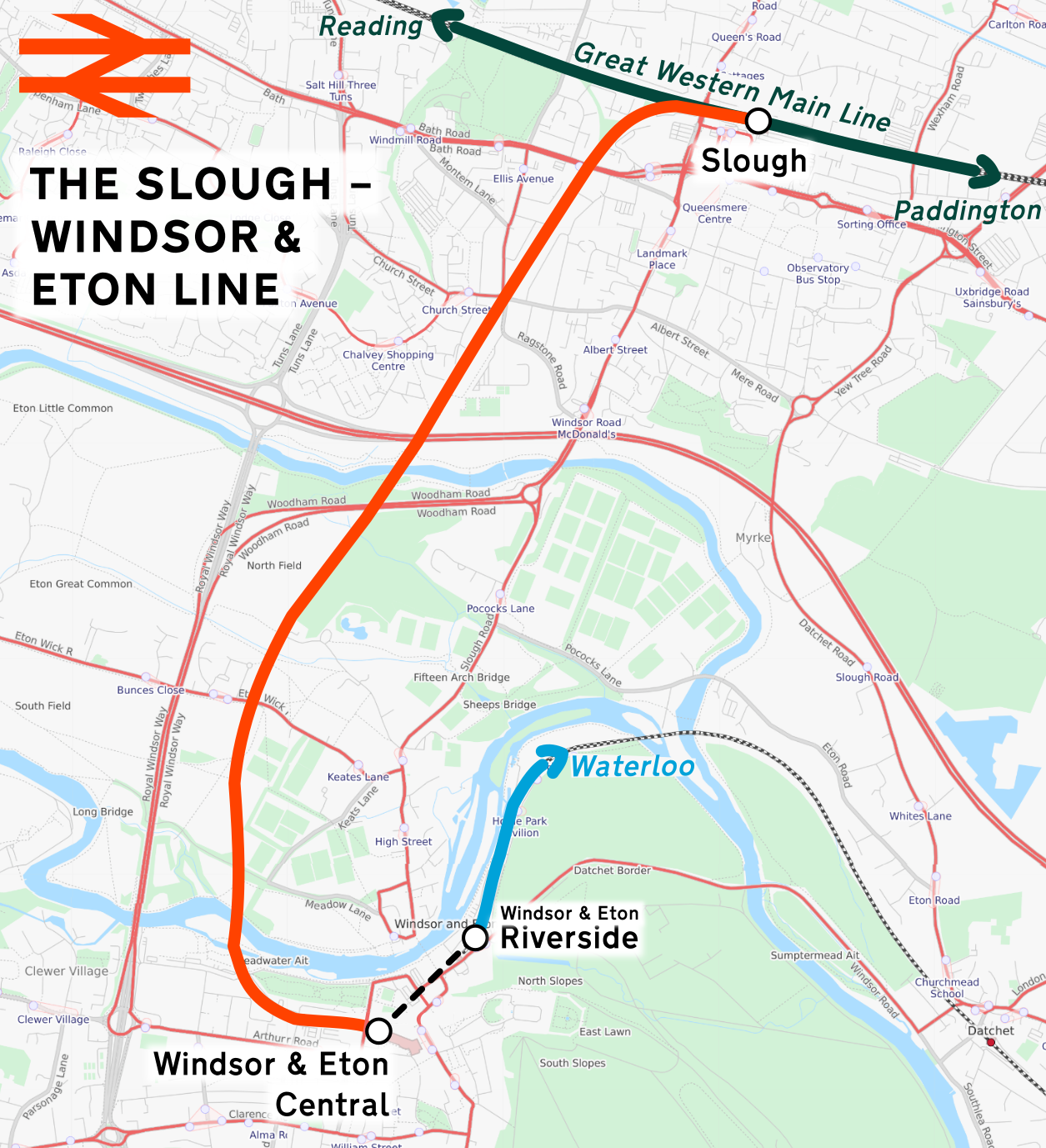
(Click to expand)

The Slough–Windsor & Eton line is a branch railway line 2 miles 63 chains (4.5 km) long, in Berkshire, England. Trains run between the line's only two stations, Slough and Windsor & Eton Central. At its northern end, the branch line joins the Great Western Main Line, but passenger trains from Windsor rarely use the connection, usually terminating at Slough.

== Services ==
A 20-minute service interval in each direction is operated by Great Western Railway using the dedicated bay platform 1 at Slough.

=== Rolling stock ===
Although the Great Western Main Line is electrified, the Windsor Branch is not. Services on it are provided by Class 165 and Class 166 two- and three-car diesel multiple units (DMUs).

In the 1970s and 1980s, DMUs such as the Class 117 and Class 121 ('Bubblecars') were used.

=== Electrification ===
Electrification of the Slough to Windsor route was approved in 2014, but on 8 November 2016, it was announced that the electrification of the branch was being delayed, without a revised forecast date.

== History ==
Great Western Railway (Slough and Windsor) Act 1848
- Act of Parliament
- Parliament of the United Kingdom
- Long title: An Act for making a Railway from the Great Western Railway near Slough to the Town of New Windsor in the County of Berks.
- Citation: 11 & 12 Vict. c. cxxxv

Dates
- Royal assent: 14 August 1848

Text of statute as originally enacted

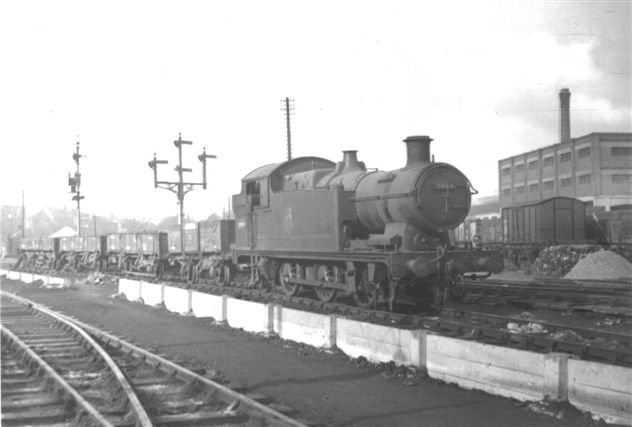
A former GWR locomotive 6664 photographed near the engine shed at Slough, 1955.

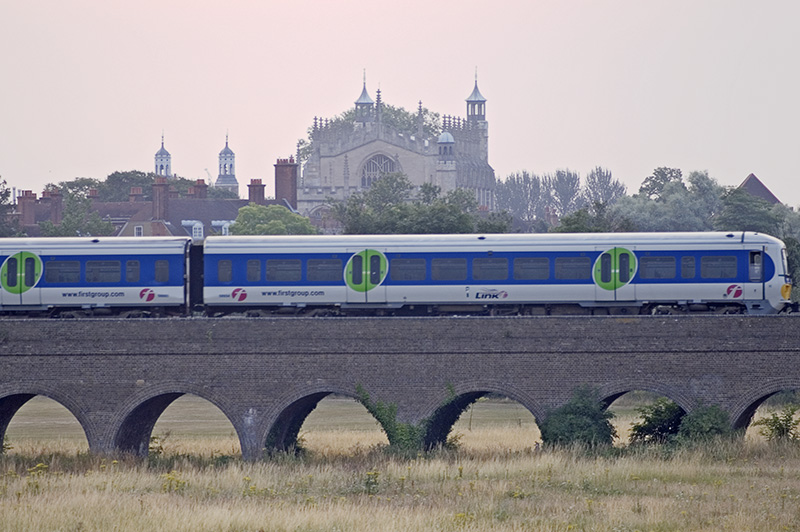
A 2-car Class 165 DMU, on the brick viaduct carrying the GWR line into Windsor (looking east towards Eton College).

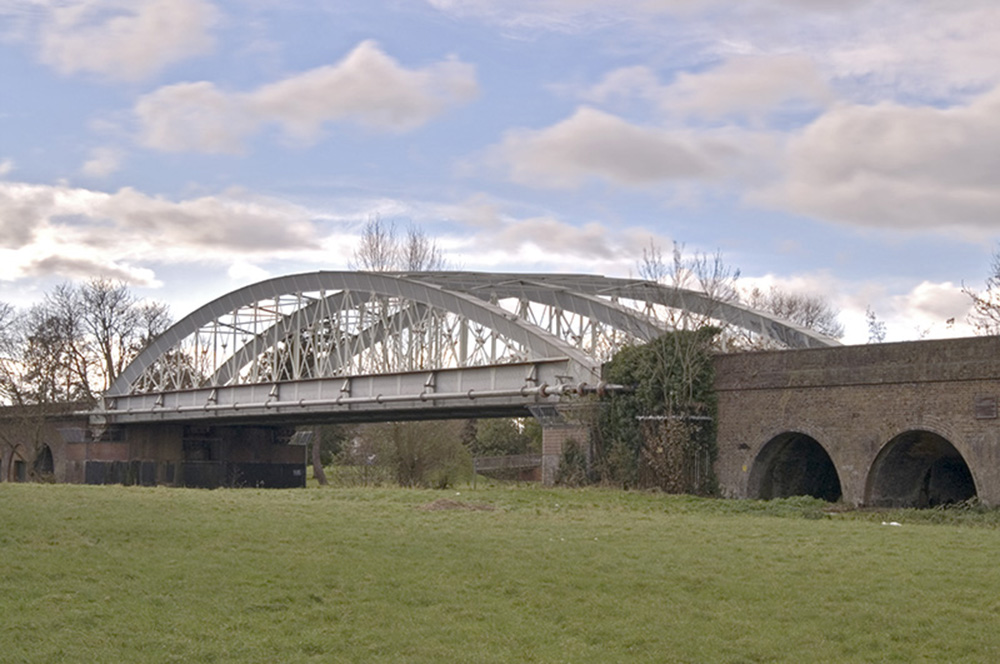
The wrought iron railway bridge at Windsor. (Picture shows downstream side, looking towards Windsor.)

The line was authorised by the Great Western Railway (Slough and Windsor) Act 1848 (11 & 12 Vict. c. cxxxv), despite opposition from Eton College, and opened on 8 October 1849. It was built as a broad gauge line but dual gauge track was laid in 1862.

And be it enacted, That it shall be lawful for the Great Western Railway Company to make and maintain a Railway or Railways, with all proper Works and Conveniences connected therewith, commencing at Two Points on the Line of the Great Western Railway near the Western Station of the said Railway at Slough in the County of Buckingham, and terminating in the Parish and Town of New Windsor in the County of Berks. — Section 13, Great Western Railway (Slough and Windsor) Act 1848 (11 & 12 Vict. c. cxxxv)

For a period from 1863, Metropolitan Railway trains served the line. Between 1 March 1883 and 30 September 1885, the branch was also served by the Metropolitan District Railway.

=== Slough Junction ===
Slough Junction was a triangular junction connecting the branch line to the mainline in both eastbound (towards London) and westbound (towards Reading) directions. It is not known whether it was used for turning complete trains; a turntable was available at Slough shed for turning locomotives. The layout of the junction was complicated, as the east curve ran between sidings of the shed.

Most service trains accessed Slough station by the eastern chord, which remains in use. It is double track, with the "outer" track to the bay platform used by branch-line trains at Slough, and the "inner" track, connected to the mainline, used by empty stock workings and by rare passenger trains.

The western chord, known as the "Royal" or "Queen's" Curve, was little used except by excursion traffic and royal trains (hence its nickname). It was closed through lack of use in 1964 and was used for a time to stable carriages, after which the track was lifted.

All land west of the eastern chord was sold for housing, and there is little evidence of the junction at the site now although aerial photographs show the curving line of the western tracks.

=== Chalvey Halt ===
The only intermediate stop on the branch line was Chalvey Halt, 47 chains (945 m) south of Bath Road Junction. The halt was authorised on 24 February 1929, at an estimated cost of £840, and opened on 6 May 1929. It comprised both "up" and "down" platforms, built from heavy timbers to the standard GWR design for halt platforms. There were also waiting shelters, and steps down to the nearby road.

After only 14 months of operation, Chalvey Halt closed on 7 July 1930. A note in the GW Engineer's Department minutes of 19 October 1930, records that the materials from Chalvey Halt had been used to build Cashes Green Halt on the Gloucester to Swindon "Golden Valley Line", between Stroud and Stonehouse.

=== Windsor Link ===
The Windsor Link Railway is a proposal to tunnel from Windsor & Eton Central to Windsor & Eton Riverside to create a through railway from Slough to Staines.
