= Ebley Crossing Halt railway station =

Railway station in Ebley, Stroud, England

Coordinates: 51.7436°N 2.2523°W

Ebley Crossing Halt
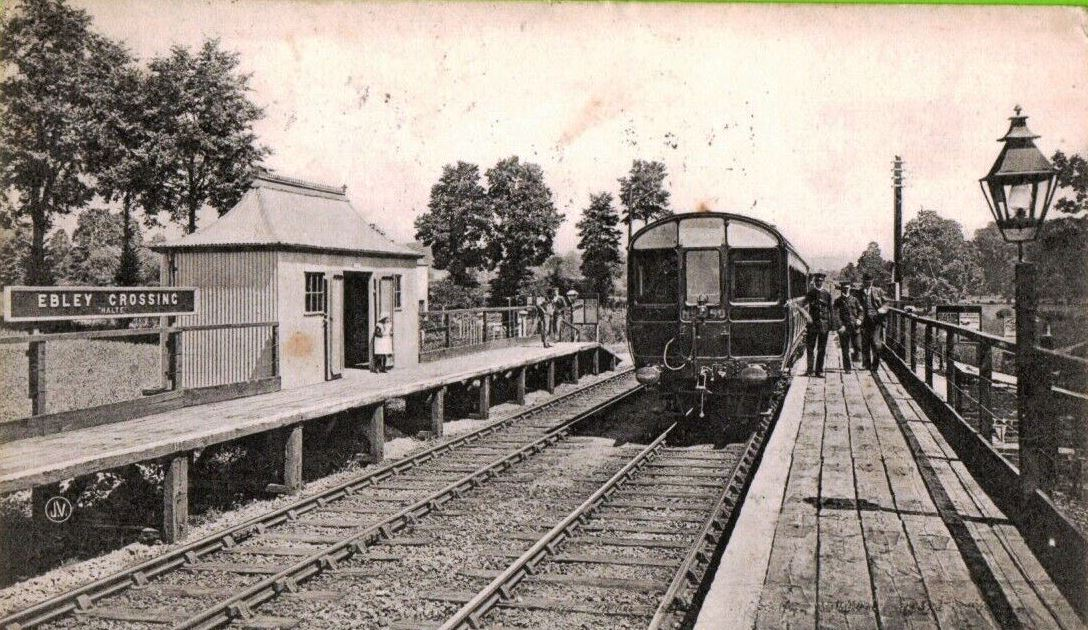

General information
- Location: Ebley, Stroud; England
- Grid reference: SO826050
- Platforms: 2

Other information
- Status: Disused

History
- Original company: Great Western Railway
- Pre-grouping: Great Western Railway
- Post-grouping: Great Western Railway

Key dates
- 12 October 1903: Station opened
- 2 November 1964: Station closed
Location

Ebley Crossing Halt was opened on 12 October 1903 on what is now the Golden Valley Line between Stroud and Stonehouse. This line was opened in 1845 as the Cheltenham and Great Western Union Railway from Swindon to Gloucester and this was one of many small stations and halts built on this line for the local passenger service.

== History ==
The halt opened on 12 October 1903 with the introduction of the Great Western Railway (GWR) steam railmotor services between Stonehouse and Chalford.

The halt was at Ebley between Stroud and Stonehouse, and originally consisted of a pair of ground level platforms, but these were subsequently replaced by standard height platforms along with GWR pagoda style shelters. The platforms were later reconstructed in concrete and the down platform had a basic metal shelter. Access to the halt was from the adjacent foot crossing and for a while, a small wooden ticket office on the down side of the Stroud end of the platform, adjacent to the foot crossing.

Closure of the halt came on 2 November 1964 following the withdrawal of local stopping passenger services on the line. No trace of the halt remains today, although the foot crossing still exists.

== Services ==
This halt was served by the Gloucester to Chalford local passenger services, known as the Chalford Auto.

Preceding station	Disused railways	Following station
Stonehouse; Line and station open	Great Western Railway; Cheltenham and Great Western Union Railway	Cashes Green Halt; Line open, station closed
