= Stroud High School =

Location
- Beards Lane, Cainscross Road; Stroud, Gloucestershire, GL5 4HF; England; 51.746°N 2.2327°W

Information
- Type: Grammar school; Academy
- Motto: "Trouthe and Honour, Fredom and Curteisye" "A learning partnership valuing respect, personal best ... and a spirit of fun. "
- Established: 1904
- Department for Education URN: 136874 Tables
- Ofsted: Reports
- Chair: Jacqui Phillips
- Head teacher: Mark McShane
- Gender: Girls
- Age: 11 to 18
- Enrolment: 1026
- Houses: Capel (C), Griffin (G), Kimmin (K) Arundel (A) and Stanley (S). All five houses are named after mills in the Stroud valleys.
- Website: stroudhigh.gloucs.sch.uk

Stroud High School (SHS) is a grammar school with academy status for girls aged 11 to 18, in Stroud, Gloucestershire, England. Since 2021, it has been a European Parliament Ambassador School.

== History ==
Stroud High School was founded in 1904 as the Girls' Endowed School by a group of local citizens led by solicitor Mr. A. J. Morton Ball, who decided that the girls of Stroud and the surrounding areas deserved a secondary school to match Marling School for boys that had been founded some years earlier. As a suitable building was not available, the school was initially housed in rooms in the School of Science and Art in Lansdown, Stroud. Miss D.M. Beale, niece of Dorothea Beale the founder of St Hilda's College, Oxford and long-term headmistress of Cheltenham Ladies' College was appointed as the first headmistress.

In 1912, D.M. Beale, her staff and seventy girls moved into a new purpose built building in the Queen Anne style which is still part of the current school complex.

In 1939, a school hall was added.

In early 1940, girls from Edgbaston High School in Birmingham were evacuated to Stroud High School, returning only when suitable air raid facilities had been constructed at EHS.

In 1964, the Stroud Secondary Technical School for Girls merged with Stroud High School.

In 1988, the school became a grant-maintained school and in 1998 a foundation school.

In 2003, the school became a Specialist School for Science and Mathematics.

In 2008, Tim Withers was appointed as its first male head in over 100 years.

In 2009, the school had a second specialism in Modern Foreign Languages.

In 2010, Stroud High School, operating through the Afri Twin organisation, twinned with Rustenburg School for Girls and Mfuleni High School, in the greater Cape Town area of Western Cape Province, South Africa.

In 2018, the school opened their new £1 million grant funded refurbished/rebuilt science block with two new classrooms.

In 2019 the school opened up places for its new co-ed cohort as Stroud High Sixth Form after splitting from Marling School. German classes are still shared and the sixth forms share the Sixth Form Block.

== Academic standards ==
Stroud High School has consistently achieved a GCSE Level 2 threshold (the equivalent of 5+A*-C) of 100%. The Ofsted Report, which graded the school as 'Outstanding' was compiled in December 2010. An inspection in 2013 revealed there were then "Areas for improvement".

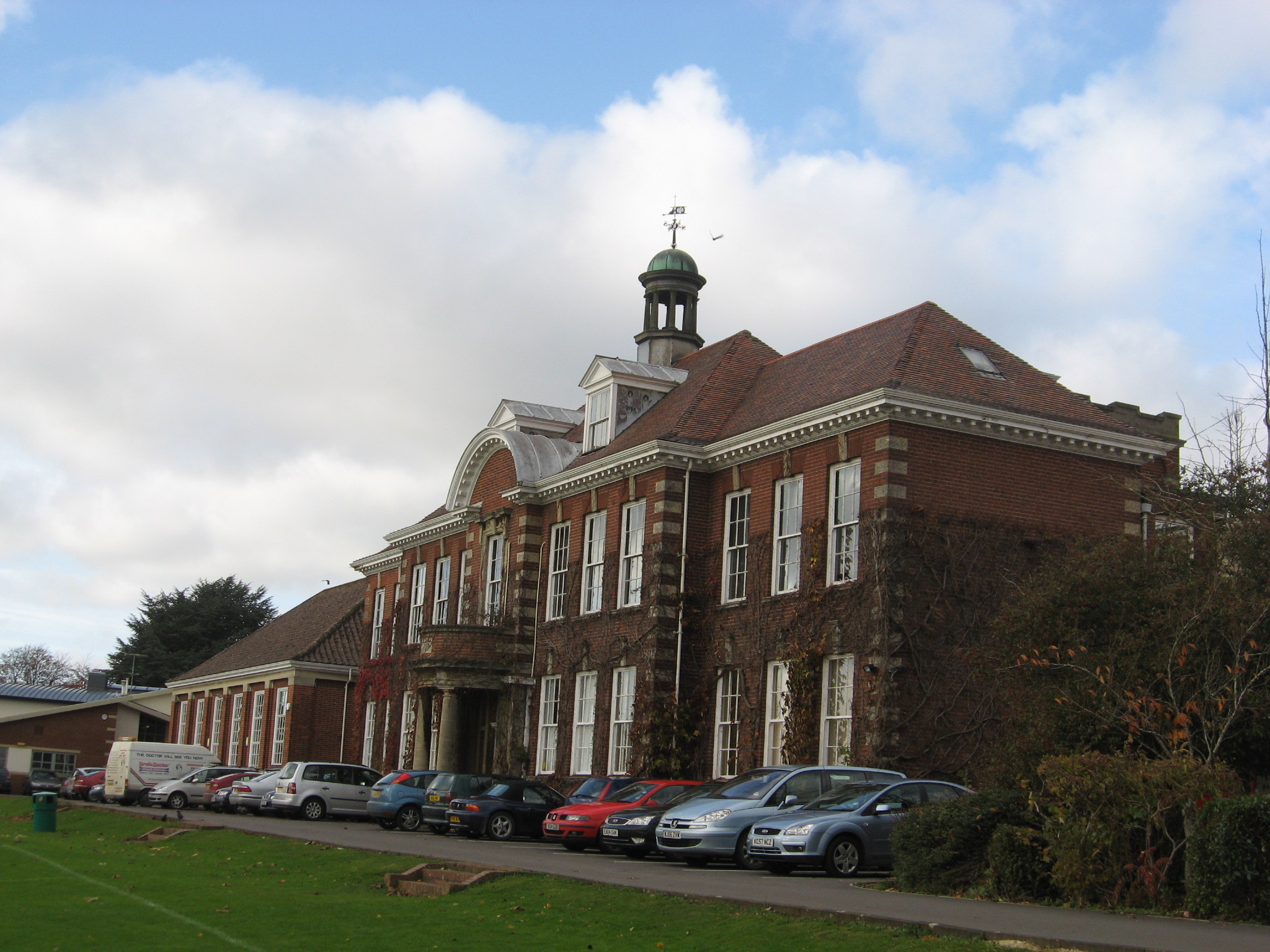
Stroud High School main building

== Academy status ==
In February 2011, Stroud High School began a consultation process with stakeholders, principally parents, staff and students which it stated might lead to the school converting to an Academy later in the year. Stroud High School then became an Academy on 1 July 2011, a month before its partner school, Marling School.

== Sixth form education ==
Students are able to continue their education beyond the age of sixteen in the school's co-educational Sixth Form which was operated jointly with Marling School until 2019, when they decided to split into Stroud High sixth form and Marling sixth form respectively. The two schools still share a number of facilities on their adjoining sites. The joint Sixth Form block was extended to double the size of the accommodation and to include a new one hundred and sixty seat Lecture Theatre.

== Notable former pupils ==
- Alicia Barnett - Tennis Player
- Anna Corderoy - Olympic Coxswain
- Tina May - jazz musician and vocalist
- Emma McClarkin - politician and youngest British MEP
- Margaret Weston - Director, the Science Museum, London (1973–1986)
