= Cashes Green =

Residential area in Gloucestershire, England

Coordinates: 51.74793°N 2.24909°W

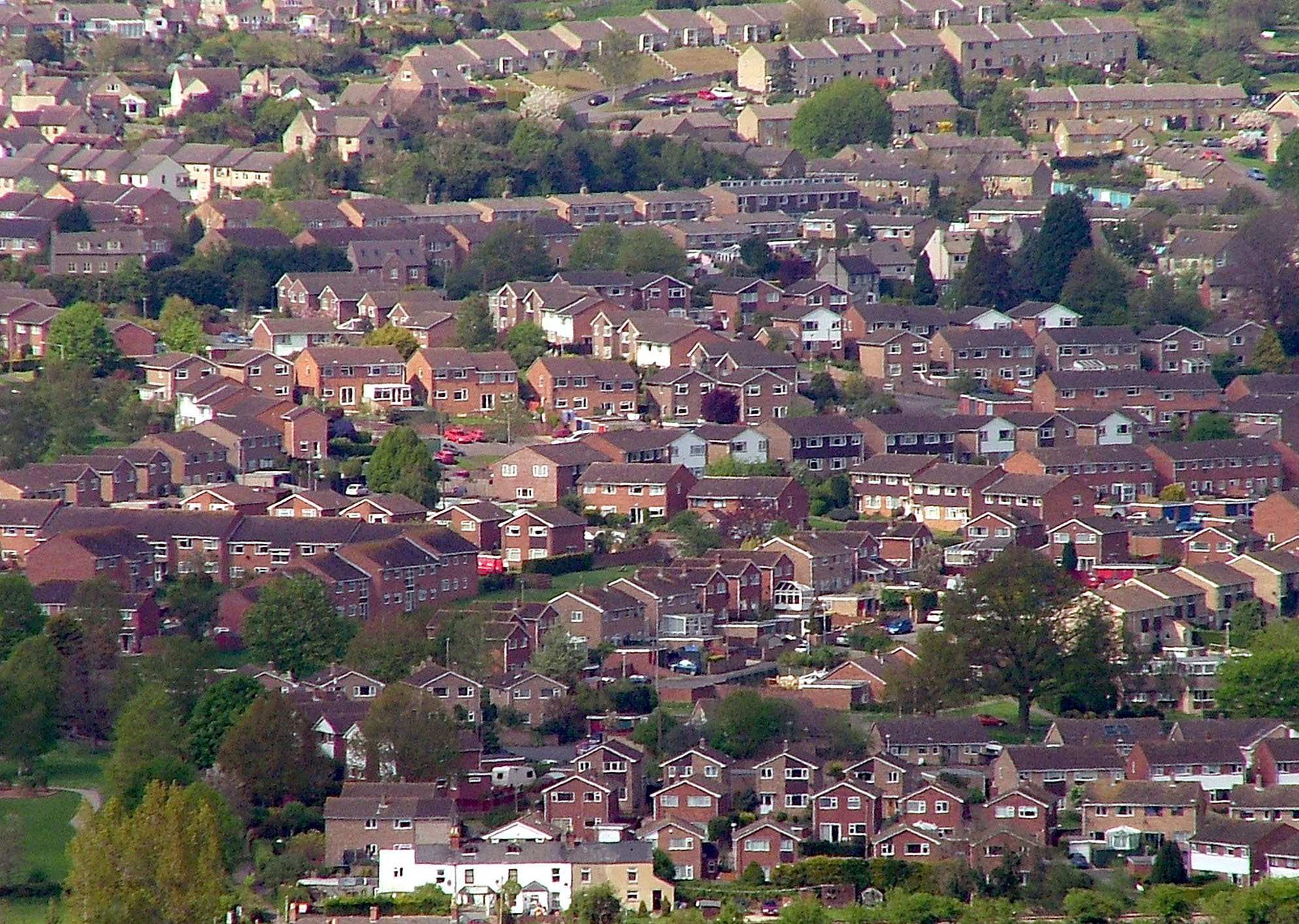
Cashes Green from Selsley Common

Cashes Green shown within Gloucestershire
(grid reference SO829055)

Cashes Green is a substantial residential area in the civil parish of Cainscross on the outskirts of Stroud, in Gloucestershire, England. Although the spelling "Cashes Green" is usual, and locally regarded as "correct", the alternative Cashe's Green also occurs, and can be seen on old ordnance survey maps, and 1970s road signs for example.

== History ==
The original small village of Cashes Green, situated on the southern slope of Randwick Hill, underwent massive expansion in the second half of the 20th century with the addition of both council and private housing estates. It is now contiguous with the neighbouring settlements of Ebley, Cainscross and Paganhill and hence with the conurbation of Stroud itself.
