= Cashes Green Halt railway station =

Disused railway station in England

Cashes Green Halt
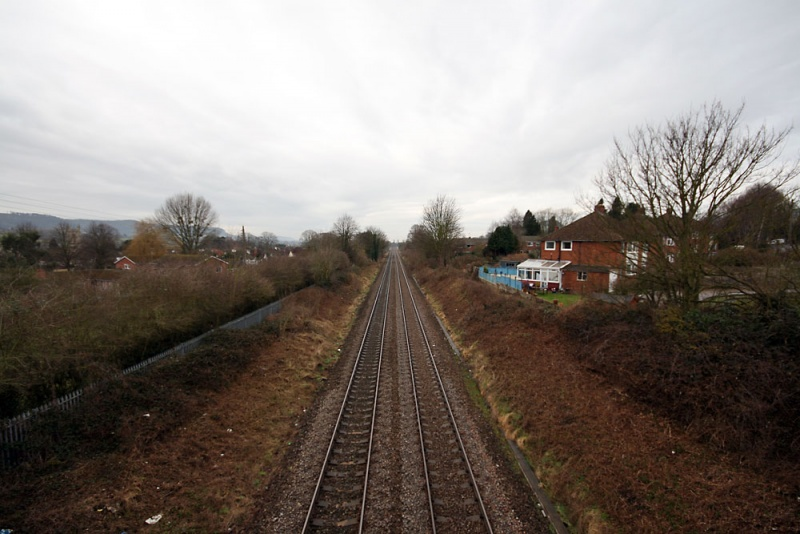
- The site of Cashes Green Halt in February 2009

General information
- Location: Cashes Green, Stroud; England
- Coordinates: 51.7448°N 2.2455°W
- Grid reference: SO831051
- Platforms: 2

Other information
- Status: Disused

History
- Original company: Great Western Railway
- Post-grouping: Great Western Railway

Key dates
- 12 May 1845: Line opened
- 22 January 1930: Station opened
- 2 November 1964: Station closed
Location

Cashes Green Halt was opened on 22 January 1930 on what is now the Golden Valley Line between Stroud and Stonehouse. This line was opened in 1845 as the Cheltenham and Great Western Union Railway from Swindon to Gloucester and this was one of many small stations and halts built on this line for the local passenger service. This particular halt was built later than the rest and was built to serve the then new Cashes Green housing development west of Stroud in response to a public request.

The halt was just west of the Cashes Green Road overbridge and consisted of a pair of timber platforms, along with corrugated iron shelters, using materials recovered from the Chalvey Halt on the Windsor line. Access to the up platform was via steps from the overbridge. These were later replaced with a Tarmac slope. (C1957) The down platform was accessed from a similar slope into the 'birdcage' (still extant - 2010) which runs parallel to the railway and then proceeds at right angles south down to Upper Church Road, Cainscross. Originally the 'birdcage' (so-called because it consists of metal railings on either side giving the pedestrian the impression that they are actually in a 'birdcage') ended in a foot crossing over the railway approximately 100 yards west of the halt. It was diverted and the crossing closed at about the time the halt was built.

Closure of the halt came in November 1964 following the withdrawal of local stopping passenger services on the line. No trace of the halt remains today.

== Services ==
This halt was served by the Gloucester to Chalford local passenger services, known as the Chalford Auto.

Preceding station	Disused railways	Following station
Ebley Crossing Halt; Line open, station closed	Great Western Railway; Cheltenham and Great Western Union Railway	Downfield Crossing Halt; Line open, station closed
