= Michael R. Angus =

British businessman

Sir Michael Richardson Angus DL (5 May 1930 – 13 March 2010) was a British businessman, best known as chair of Unilever.

Michael Angus attended marling school in his youth.

== Biography ==
Angus was born in West Ashford, Kent and raised in the Cotswolds near to Cirencester, and educated at Marling School, Stroud, Gloucestershire. Angus graduated in mathematics from Bristol University.

=== Career ===
Joining Anglo-Dutch conglomerate Unilever straight from university, he spent most of his career in the company's toiletries businesses (soaps and toothpaste) in France and Britain. In 1979 he moved to Lever Brothers in New York City, where he spent four years cleaning house at the Lever Brothers subsidiary. He returned to UK as the joint-chairman alongside Floris Maljers.

=== Other positions ===
Angus was President of the Confederation of British Industry from 7 May 1992 to May 1994. Sir Michael's other appointments include: –

- Chairman of Whitbread Plc
- non-executive directors and Deputy chairman British Airways Plc
- non-executive director and chairman Boots Group
- non-executive director National Westminster Bank
- Chairman of Ashridge Business School
- Member of the Council of British Executive Service Overseas
- Chairman of the Trustees of The Leverhulme Trust
- Director of the Ditchley Foundation
- International Counsellor Emeritus of the Conference Board in New York
- non-executive director for the Halcrow Group Limited.
- Chairman of the Royal Agricultural College, Cirencester until 2005.

Angus was appointed a Deputy Lieutenant of Gloucestershire in 1997. He received an Honorary Doctorate of Science from the University of Bristol in 1990 and another Honorary Doctorate of Science from the University of Buckingham in 1994.

=== The Greenbury Committee (1995) ===
Sir Michael was a member of the influential Greenbury Committee which reviewed the processes and regulations surrounding executive remuneration. The report, which encouraged more disclosure and reporting, was later found to have increased rather than decreased levels of top executive pay.

=== Personal life ===
Married to Isabel, the couple had three children. They lived on their organic farm in North Cerney, from which they marketed cheese made from their herd of goats. Angus was an acknowledged wine buff. He died aged 79 in his home on 13 March 2010. Lady Angus died in 2016.
