= Cainscross =

Town in Gloucestershire, England

Coordinates: 51.74°N 02.24°W

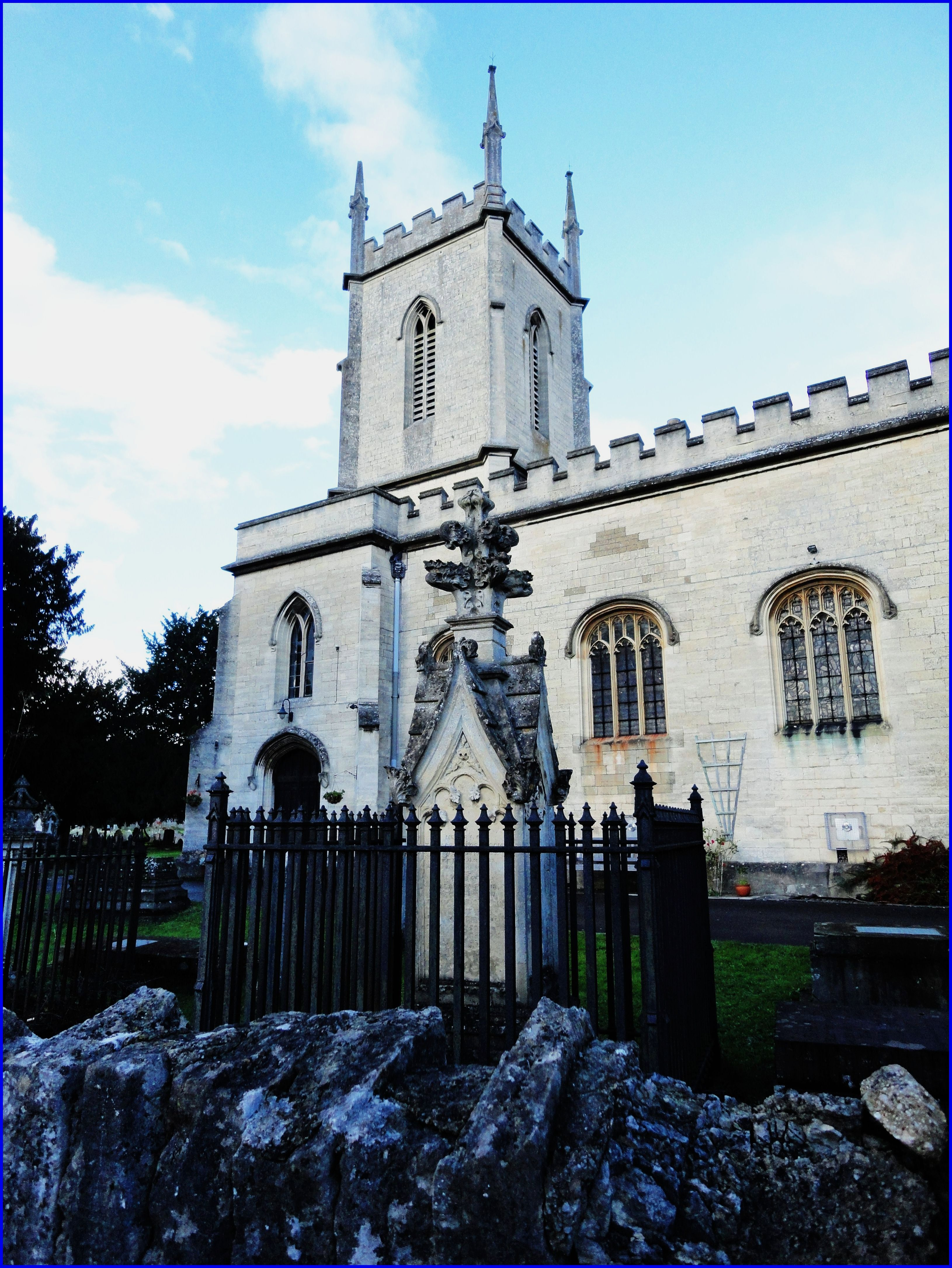
- St Matthew's Church

- Location within Gloucestershire
- Population: 7,253 (2021 Census)
- OS grid reference: SO8305
- Civil parish: Cainscross
- District: Stroud
- Shire county: Gloucestershire
- Region: South West
- Country: England
- Sovereign state: United Kingdom
- Post town: Stroud
- Postcode district: GL5
- Dialling code: 01453
- Police: Gloucestershire
- Fire: Gloucestershire
- Ambulance: South Western
- UK Parliament: Stroud

Cainscross is a suburban town and civil parish in Gloucestershire, England, bordering the town of Stroud and forming part of the Stroud urban area. The parish includes the communities of Ebley, Cashes Green and Cainscross, and part of Dudbridge.

The population of the civil parish was 6,680 (in 2001) of which 14.6% are in the 5–14 age group. The area is predominantly white (98.4%) with a high proportion of lone parent households with dependent children in comparison to the Stroud and county averages. 18.8% of the household rent from a social landlord, 6.2% of household are claiming housing benefit, and 22.4% of households have no car – again all much higher than the county or Stroud profiles. Lone pensioner households are also high, at 18.2%, with smaller proportions of people providing unpaid care, and higher social service referrals for the over-75s than elsewhere.

As a relatively prosperous parish within Gloucestershire, there are low levels of burglary, theft of motor vehicles; the numbers of serious and fatal road traffic accidents compared to the county average. The percentage of young offenders resident in the area and of children with low scores at key stages 1–3, are also below the Stroud and county averages.

Local amenities include a post office and a number of shops, including a medium-sized co-operative supermarket. It is well connected to Stroud town centre, 1.6 miles (2.5 km) to the east, with frequent bus services to Stonehouse, Gloucester and Cheltenham. The Stroudwater Canal is immediately to the south, as is Selsley Common.

== Governance ==
A town (or parish) council and an electoral ward in the same name exist. Much of the ward is in the parish, but stretches to Randwick. The total ward population taken at the 2011 census was 7,316.

== Notable people ==
- Eugene Paul Bennett VC was born in Cainscross.
- William Vick, pioneer photographer, was a local schoolmaster in the 1850s–1860s, before becoming a photographer in Ipswich.
