= Russell Ormond Redman =

Canadian astronomer

Russell Ormond Redman (born 1951) is a Canadian astronomer and a specialist in radio astronomy who worked on the staff of the National Research Council of Canada at the Dominion Astrophysical Observatory until he retired in 2013. In 1966, just after 9th grade, he first volunteered for the DAO in Victoria, British Columbia. His initial publication was a list of nearest stars in the 1970 Observer's Handbook, while he was still in high school. He received his Ph.D. from California Institute of Technology in 1982, and subsequently published over 75 scientific papers.

== Honors ==
The inner main-belt asteroid 7886 Redman, discovered by Canadian astronomer David D. Balam in 1993, has been named jointly for him and for Roderick Oliver Redman, Professor of Astronomy at Cambridge University, no relation except that both worked at the DAO during significant parts of their careers. The official naming citation was published on 10 June 1998 (M.P.C. 32095).
