= Windsor & Eton Central railway station =

Terminus station in Windsor, England

Coordinates: 51°28′59″N 0°36′36″W

Windsor & Eton Central
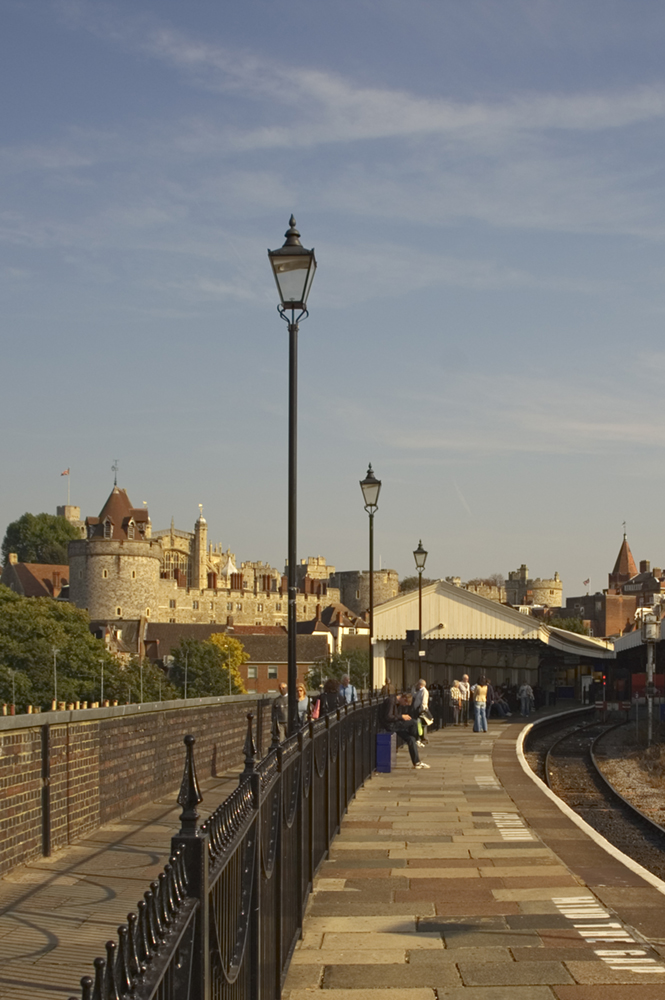
- The truncated Platform 1 with the towers of Windsor Castle visible in the background

General information
- Location: Windsor; Windsor and Maidenhead; England
- Grid reference: SU966769
- Owner: Network Rail
- Manager: Great Western Railway
- Platforms: 1

Other information
- Station code: WNC
- Classification: DfT category D

History
- Original company: Great Western Railway
- Pre-grouping: Great Western Railway
- Post-grouping: Great Western Railway

Key dates
- 8 October 1849: Opened as Windsor
- 1 June 1904: Renamed Windsor & Eton
- 26 September 1949: Renamed Windsor & Eton Central

Passengers
- 2020/21: ▼0.393 million
- Interchange: ▼11,536
- 2021/22: ▲0.982 million
- Interchange: ▲22,209
- 2022/23: ▲1.580 million
- Interchange: ▲31,942
- 2023/24: ▲1.757 million
- Interchange: ▼30,621
- 2024/25: ▼1.708 million
- Interchange: ▼26,094
Location
Notes
- Passenger statistics from the Office of Rail & Road

Windsor & Eton Central station is one of two terminal stations serving the town of Windsor, Berkshire, England. It is situated on Thames Street, almost immediately opposite Castle Hill, the main public entrance to Windsor Castle. The station is the terminus of a branch line from Slough operated by Great Western Railway.

Originally named Windsor, the station was renamed twice: first to Windsor & Eton on 1 June 1904; and then to Windsor & Eton Central on 26 September 1949.

A significant portion of the station has been converted into a shopping complex named Windsor Royal Shopping; a ticket office and truncated platform remain for services on the Slough–Windsor & Eton line.

The station is 400 metres (0.25 mi) from Windsor's other station, Windsor & Eton Riverside, the terminus for services from London Waterloo.

== History ==
=== Construction ===
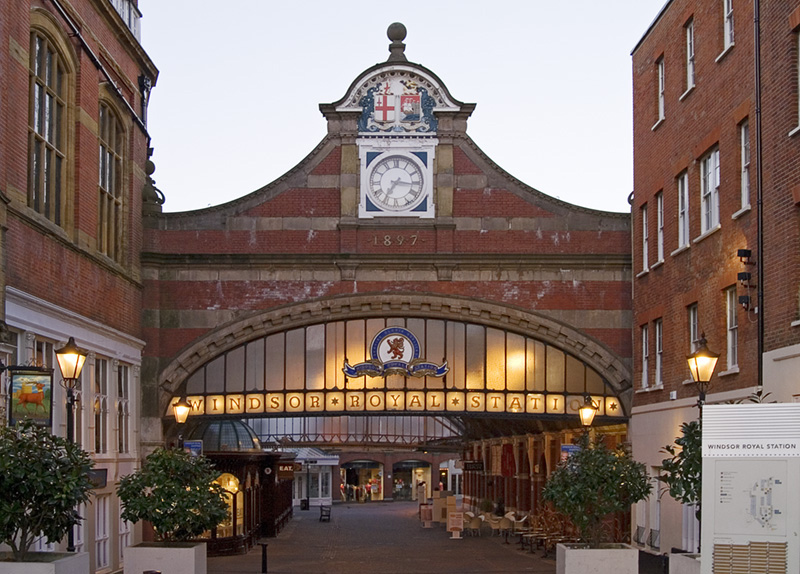
The main entrance to the station, opposite Windsor Castle

Windsor Station opened on 8 October 1849 on the completion of the branch line from Slough but only after considerable opposition from the leadership at Eton College, which was convinced that the proximity of a railway would lead the Eton boys astray.

An extension of the branch was planned in 1871–1872 to connect to the south via Dedworth and Ascot. It was planned to diverge west from the viaduct, just to the south of the river bridge. Despite reaching an advanced stage of design and with some property purchased plus the construction of a possible station building, the plans were never completed and were abandoned completely by 1914.

=== The Metropolitan and District railways ===
When, in 1863, the Metropolitan Railway opened the world's first underground railway, between London Paddington and Farringdon Street in the City of London, the Great Western Railway ran regular through services to Windsor from Farringdon. Initially these were broad gauge trains, as the original Metropolitan was laid for mixed standard and broad gauges and, for some months, the engines and coaches were hired from the GWR. By 1865, there were ten trains daily on the route.

Later the District Railway expanded its services to the west of London. On 1 March 1883, it started a service to Windsor from Mansion House, using the Great Western main line. The trains were not popular, possibly because of the unsuitability of using four-wheel coaches for the non-stop section between Ealing Broadway and Slough and possibly also because Windsor was both too affluent and too far from the city to make commuting attractive. The service was discontinued on 30 September 1885.

=== Structure ===
The station is approached by a 2,035-yard (1.861 km) brick viaduct and Windsor Railway Bridge, the last surviving wrought iron bridge designed by Isambard Kingdom Brunel. The original building was little more than a glorified train shed. This was completely rebuilt by the Great Western Railway for Queen Victoria's Diamond Jubilee, with a much grander frontage and an interior reminiscent of Paddington. Two island platforms and a bay on the south side were provided. A royal waiting room existed on platform 4. Having last been used during the funeral of George V in January 1936, in 1950 it was converted for use by the British Transport Police.

=== Goods yard ===
To the north of the station, a large goods yard was laid out between the station and the River Thames at ground level. Since the station was built somewhat higher up, the yard had to be reached by a steep incline built against the side of the viaduct. It sloped down towards a short headshunt, near the river bridge, which allowed switchback access to the yard sidings. This arrangement limited the number of wagons that could be transferred to and from the sidings in one go. In addition to serving the populace of Windsor and surrounding area, the yard provided a depot for Windsor gas works, receiving loads of coal and removing coke and tar.

When freight services ceased in the 1960s, the goods yard and incline were removed. The yard became a coach park but, on the side of the viaduct, it is possible to see where the incline was.

=== Decline ===
On 17 November 1968, platforms 3 and 4 were taken out of use, followed on 5 September 1969 by platform 2. Later, the remaining platform was also truncated, twice, at each rebuild of the station.

=== Royalty & Empire ===
In 1982, British Railways and Madame Tussauds restored the station, creating an exhibition called Royalty & Empire (initially Royalty & Railways). The exhibition recalled the Diamond Jubilee of Queen Victoria in 1897, using displays of wax models and an audio-visual show featuring early Audio-Animatronic figures. It opened on 2 April 1983. After entering the exhibition via the ticket office, visitors would be greeted by a scene on the platform depicting the arrival of the Royal Train, complete with figures of station staff and a full size replica train.

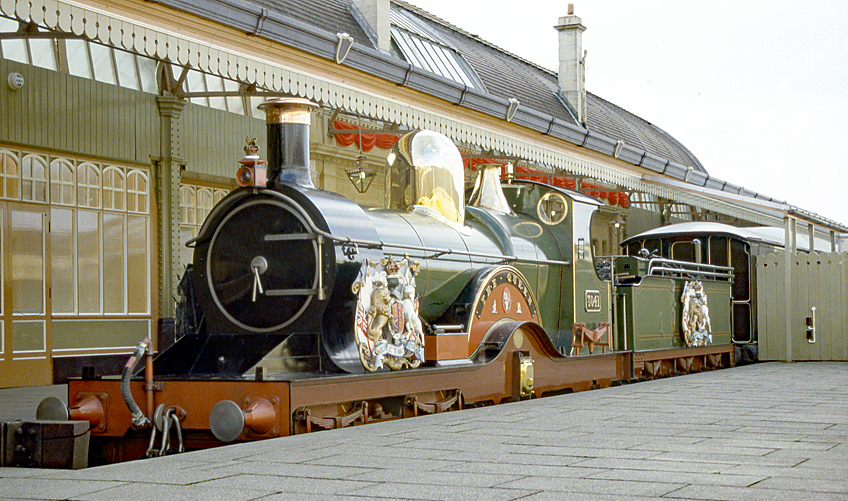
3041 The Queen, replica Dean Single

A full-size replica steam locomotive, GWR 3031 Class The Queen, was built at Steamtown, Carnforth, and this was combined with an ex South Eastern & Chatham Railway tender and fittings from a GWR tender. The locomotive's bogie and rear wheels are also from another GWR tender, but the large driving wheels are only half complete (the lower half) and they do not sit directly on the rails. This allowed the locomotive to be rolled into position when the exhibition was built. The replica was completed in December 1982 and delivered by road in January 1983. Two mobile cranes hoisted it onto the viaduct, then it was rolled into position on temporary track. Tussaud's fitted smoke and steam generators so that steam was emitted from the cab, whistles and safety valves, and smoke from the chimney. A sound unit was also fitted.

Two carriages were used to form a replica of the Royal Train. Directly behind the loco was No. 229, a replica coach mounted on an ex-British Railways BG Full Brake underframe and containing waxwork figures of various members of the Royal Family. The second coach was the original Royal Day Saloon No. 9002 that was rescued for the exhibition from a cliff top in Aberporth, Wales.

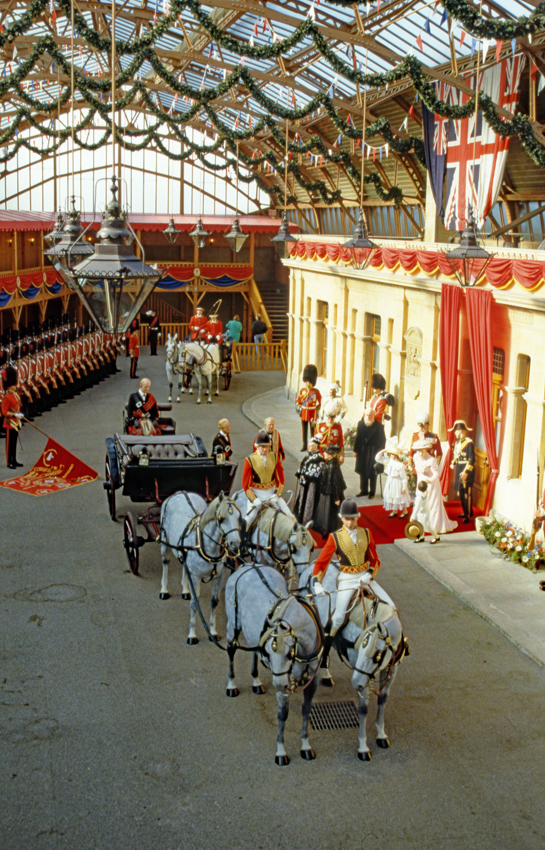
Royal Parade tableau

After leaving the platform, visitors could see the restored royal waiting room with figures of Queen Victoria and the Prince and Princess of Wales, before entering 'The Royal Parade' area. A walkway was constructed up and around the canopy, allowing visitors to view figures of the royal party exiting the waiting room and the queen boarding her Ascot landau. More than seventy wax figures of soldiers of 2nd Battalion Coldstream Guards formed part of this scene.

The last part of the exhibit was the 'Sixty Glorious Years' audio-visual show. The show outlined the growth of Great Britain using slides and projections, before the screen sank to reveal moving animatronic figures of some of the great personalities of the Victorian age, including Queen Victoria herself.

The exhibition closed in the late 1990s and almost all of the exhibits were taken away. The locomotive The Queen was too expensive to remove, so, rather than being cut up, it was incorporated as a feature of a restaurant on the concourse where it remains today. The tender – the only original (and historic) part of the replica engine – was sold to a scrap dealer and cut up, although the springs and axleboxes were salvaged for use in the replica London, Brighton & South Coast Railway Atlantic project at the Bluebell Railway, and part of one side was rescued by the Slough and Windsor Railway Society, where it is now on display. The original Royal Saloon No. 9002 is preserved at the Museum of the Great Western Railway. It is not known what happened to the replica coach. The Royal Waiting Room is part of a restaurant on the concourse.

=== Present day ===
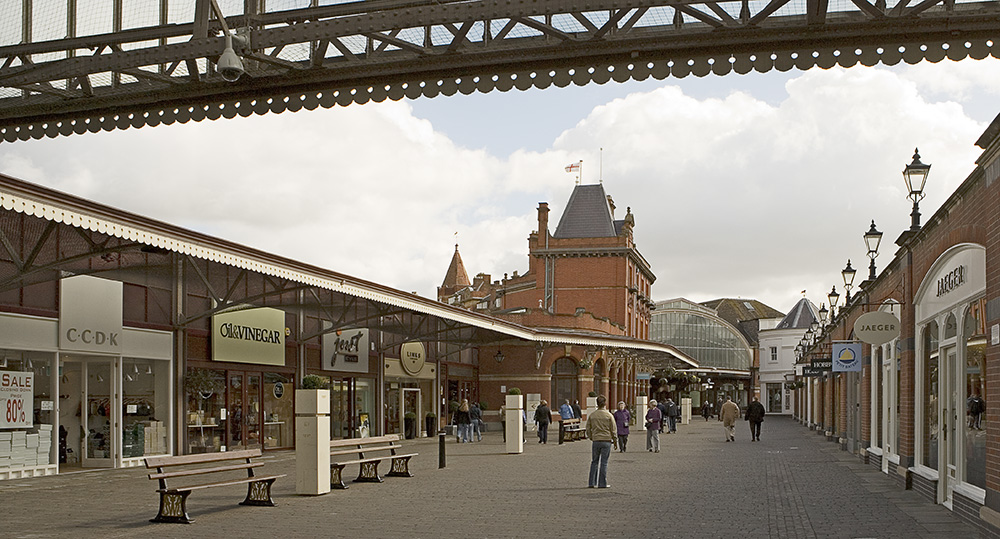
The station as a shopping complex

In 1997, Axa bought the station buildings and enlarged and remodelled them as a shopping complex called Windsor Royal Shopping. The single platform was truncated still further, and can now handle no more than a four coach train.

== Windsor Link Railway ==
The Windsor Link Railway was a 2009 proposal for a new railway connecting the Great Western and South West Trains franchise areas and potentially linking both to Heathrow Airport. Windsor & Eton Central and Windsor & Eton Riverside railway stations would have been replaced with one through-route station in the Windsor Goswells.

The proposal was rejected by the government in December 2018.

== In popular culture ==
The station has been used as a location in several other films, including Lease of Life (1954), Two Way Stretch (1960), Doctor in Distress (1963) and The Lovers! (1973).

== Services ==
Windsor & Eton Central station is served by a Great Western Railway operated shuttle service from Slough. The journey takes 6 minutes each way, and return trips run every 20 minutes. At Slough, there are semi-fast and stopping services, operated by Great Western Railway and the Elizabeth line respectively, to Reading and London Paddington.

Preceding station	National Rail	Following station
Terminus	Great Western Railway Windsor branch	Slough
	Historical railways	
Terminus	Great Western Railway Windsor branch	Chalvey Halt Line open, station closed
	Historical services	
Preceding station	London Underground	Following station
Terminus	District line	Slough towards Mansion House
