= Marling School =

Location
- Stroud, Gloucestershire, GL5 4HE; England
- 51.7454°N 2.2354°W

Information
- Type: Grammar, Academy
- Motto: Abeunt studia in mores (Studies form character); Nulli Praeda Sumus (We are prey to none)
- Established: 1887
- Founder: Sir Samuel Marling
- Department for Education URN: 137123 Tables
- Ofsted: Reports
- Principal: Jules Godfrey
- Gender: Boys (Y7-Y11), mixed sixth form (Y12-Y13)
- Age: 11 to 18
- Enrolment: 832
- Houses: Bennett, Carter, Elliott, Fuller, Greenstreet
- Colours: Purple, Blue, Yellow, Red, Green
- Website: marling.school

Marling School is a grammar school with academy status for boys, with a co-educational sixth form, in Stroud, Gloucestershire, England. It is on the Cainscross Road, the main route out of Stroud towards the M5, and is next to the girls' grammar school, Stroud High School, with which it shares some facilities.

== History ==
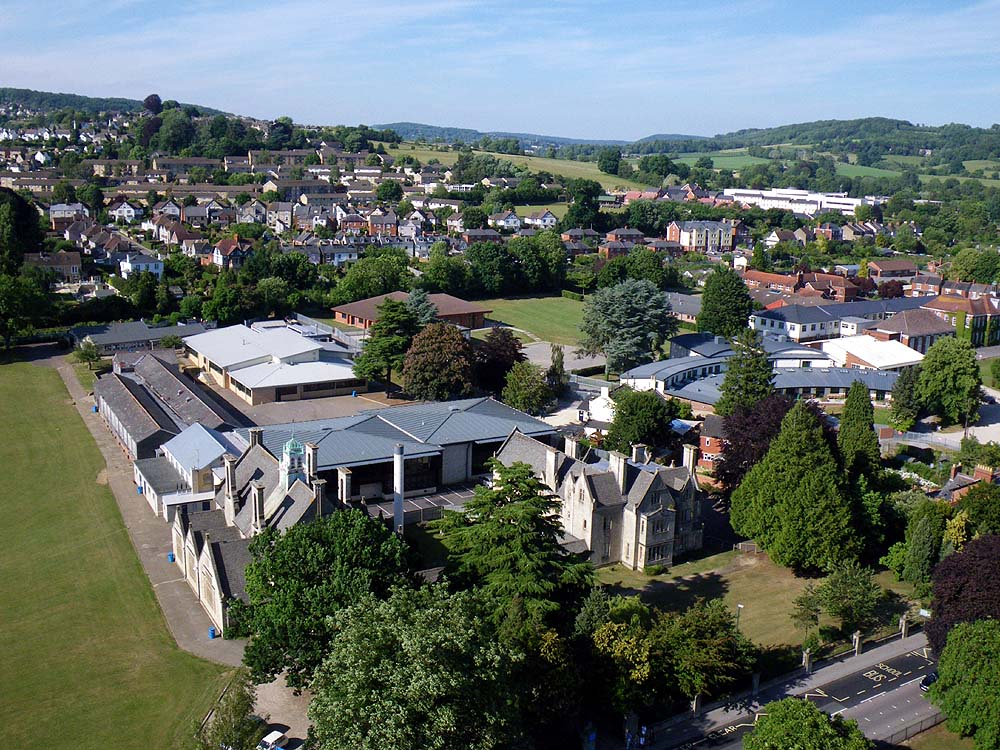
Aerial view of the school.

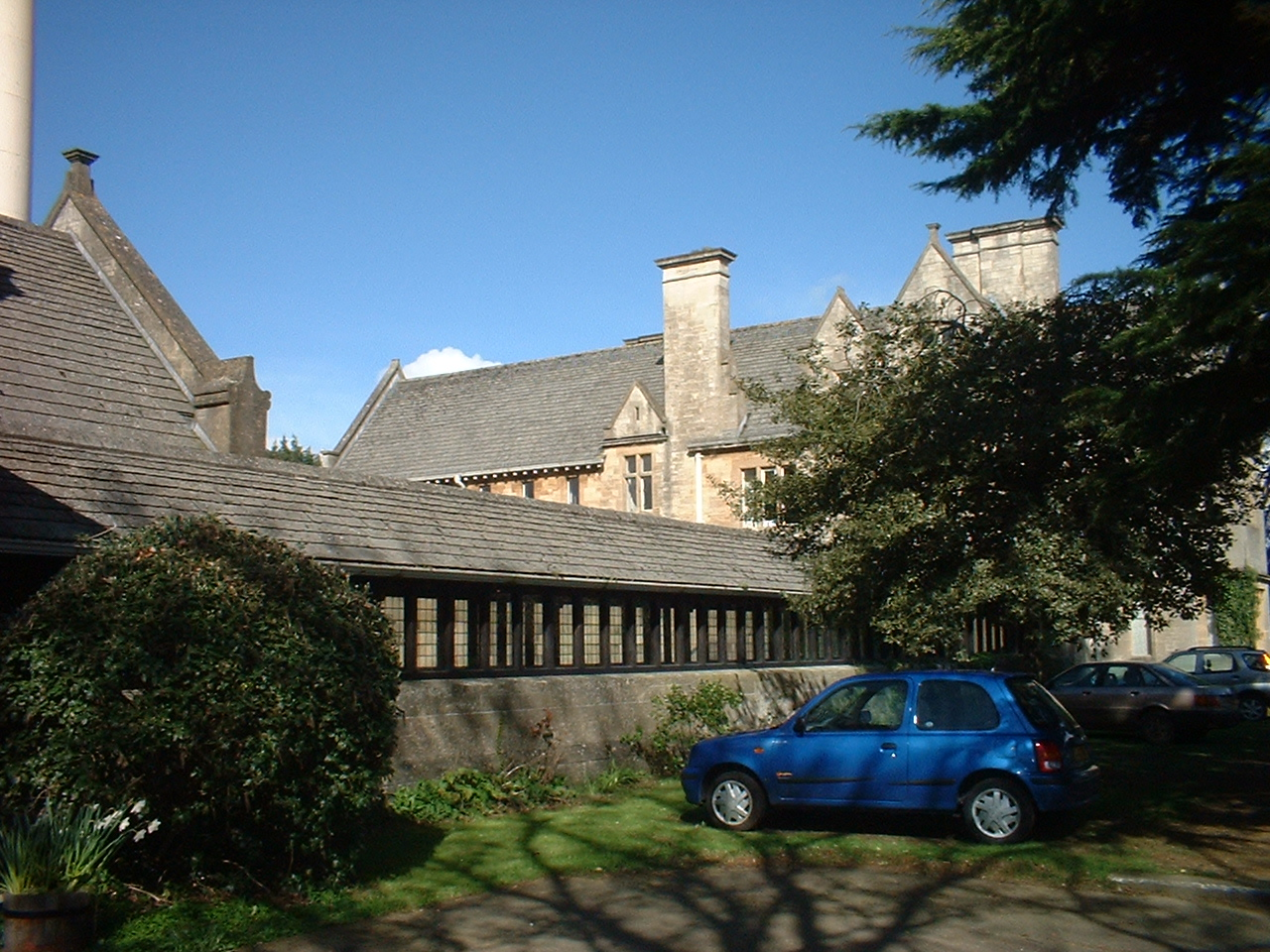
The school viewed from the road.

Marling School is the oldest secondary school in Stroud, having been founded in 1887 by Sir Samuel Marling, a local cloth manufacturer and former Liberal Member of Parliament, along with Sir Francis Hyett and Mr S.S. Dickinson.

In 1882, Sir Samuel Marling offered £10,000 towards the building of the school, and the school also inherited a number of endowments from the Red Coat School which was founded in 1642 by Thomas Webb, the St Chloe School founded at Amberley by Nathaniel Cambridge in 1699, and the educational charities established in the 17th and 18th centuries by William Johns and Robert Aldridge.

The new school opened to fee-paying pupils, which included some boarding students, in 1889. In 1909, under a new scheme the school became a public secondary school. Its endowments, along with those of the Stroud School of Science and Art and the Stroud High School for girls, were placed under the administration of a body called the Stroud Educational Foundation.

The old school houses were built shortly after the school's foundation, designed by W. H. Seth-Smith.

In 1965, the school was amalgamated with the Stroud Technical School for Boys which had been founded on a neighbouring site in 1910. The Technical School buildings now form the Art and Drama departments.

The head teacher David Lock was dismissed for gross misconduct in 2007 after allegations of bullying.

Following the appointment of Stuart Wilson as the new headteacher in 2010, Marling School converted to an academy in August 2011.

In November 2023, Stroud News and Journal reported that the headteacher Glen Balmer had resigned.

In January 2024, it was announced by the Cotswold Beacon Academy Trust that Jules Godfrey will be appointed as headteacher of Marling School from April 2024, becoming the school's first permanent female headteacher.

In 2026 there was anger among former pupils when it was suggested that a proposed merger with the Lift Schools Trust Group would see the name changed to Lift Marling. The name change was dropped as a result.

The left hand side of the school shield contains the Marling family crest while the right hand side relates to the marriage of Samuel Stephens Marling to Margaret Williams Cartwright of Devizes.

== Facilities ==
Following a successful bid to the EFA, the school was awarded a grant of £3.5 million to build a new block, named 'West Block' (or ‘WB) which houses the Geography, Mathematics and Religious Education departments and a new dining hall overlooking the cricket pitch and pavilion. The Design and Technology block incorporates teaching rooms for food technology, graphical products, resistant materials and electronics. This building is shared with Stroud High School. The South Block (or ‘SB’) built in 2005 houses English, Foreign Languages and Computing Science. The old gymnasium has been refurbished and repurposed as a library and school archive.

A modern sixth form block serves the students of both the Marling School and Stroud High School. This was the building used by Downfield Sixth Form until the two schools split into having their own sixth forms.

== Notable alumni ==
- Peter Barnes - Dramatist
- Eugene Paul Bennett - Soldier, recipient of the Victoria Cross
- Philip Dee Physicist
- Brian Gardiner, palaeontologist and zoologist.
- Giles Harrison - Physicist
- Peter Hennessy, Baron Hennessy of Nympsfield - Historian and political journalist
- Jack Lee - Film director
- Laurie Lee - Poet, Novelist and screenwriter
- Tim McInnerny - Actor
- Roderick Oliver Redman - Professor of Astrophysics and past President of the Royal Astronomical Society
- Christian Ribeiro - Footballer
- Carl Trueman - Theologian
- Colin Walker - Cellist
- Sir Michael Angus - Ex-chairman of Unilever
