= Eugene Paul Bennett =

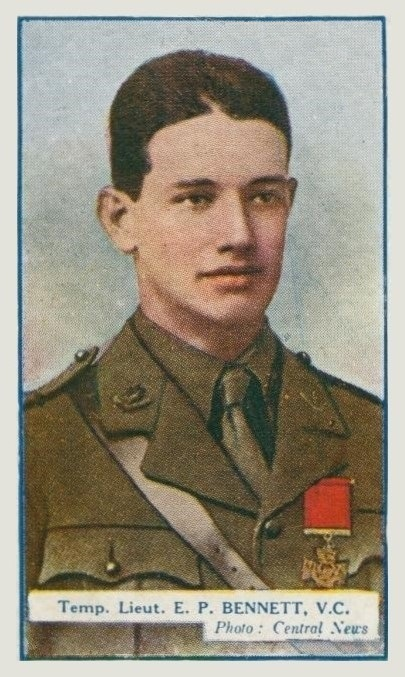
- Eugene Paul Bennett as depicted on a Cigarette card
- Born: 4 June 1892; Cainscross, Gloucestershire, England
- Died: 6 April 1970 (aged 77); Vicenza, Italy
- Military career
- Allegiance: United Kingdom
- Branch: British Army
- Service years: 1913–1918
- Rank: Captain
- Units: The Worcestershire Regiment
- Conflicts: World War I: First Battle of the Somme
- Awards: Victoria Cross; Military Cross
- Other work: Barrister and magistrate

Eugene Paul Bennett VC MC (4 June 1892 – 6 April 1970) was an English recipient of the Victoria Cross, the highest and most prestigious award for gallantry in the face of the enemy that can be awarded to British and Commonwealth forces.

He was born in Cainscross, Stroud, Gloucestershire, one of six children of Charles and Florence Bennett. Bennett was a pupil of Marling School from 1905 to 1908 having gained a scholarship from Uplands School, Stroud.

After leaving school, he worked at the Bank of England and joined the Artists Rifles, Territorial Force, as a private. After the outbreak of the First World War, in October 1914 he went with his regiment to France. Commissioned as a second lieutenant in The Worcestershire Regiment in December 1914, he was awarded the Military Cross in January 1916 for service during Battle of Loos the previous autumn.

Bennett was a 24 years old Temporary Lieutenant in the 2nd Battalion, The Worcestershire Regiment, during the First World War when on 5 November 1916 near Le Transloy France the deed took place for which he was awarded the VC.

The award citation published in the London Gazette reads:

Temporary Lieutenant Bennett, of the Worcestershire Regiment, when in command of the second wave of the attack, found that the first wave had suffered heavy casualties. Its commander had been killed and the second line was wavering. Lieutenant Bennett advanced at the head of the second wave and by his personal example of valour and resolution reached his objective with but sixty men. Isolated with his small party, he at once took steps to consolidate his position, under heavy rifle and machine gun fire from both flanks, and although wounded, he remained in command, directing and controlling. He set an example of cheerfulness and resolution beyond all praise, and there is little doubt that, but for his personal example of courage, the attack would have been checked at the outset.

He later achieved the rank of captain. After the war he became a barrister, being called to the bar in 1923, then practicing as Prosecuting Counsel from 1931 to 1935. From 1935 he served as a Metropolitan Magistrate until his retirement in 1961. During World War II he served as an officer in the Air Training Corps of the RAF. He retired to Vicenza, in northern Italy, where he died in April 1970 at the age of 77 and was cremated.

His VC was presented to Bennett by King George V at Buckingham Palace on 5 February 1917. It is now held by the Worcestershire Regiment collection in the Worcester City Art Gallery & Museum in Worcester, England.

== Bibliography ==
- Monuments to Courage (David Harvey, 1999)
- The Register of the Victoria Cross (This England, 1997)
- VCs of the First World War - The Somme (Gerald Gliddon, 1994)
- Marling School 1887–1987 (W. Oliver Wicks, 1986)
