= Slough railway station =

Principal railway station in the English town of Slough

Slough
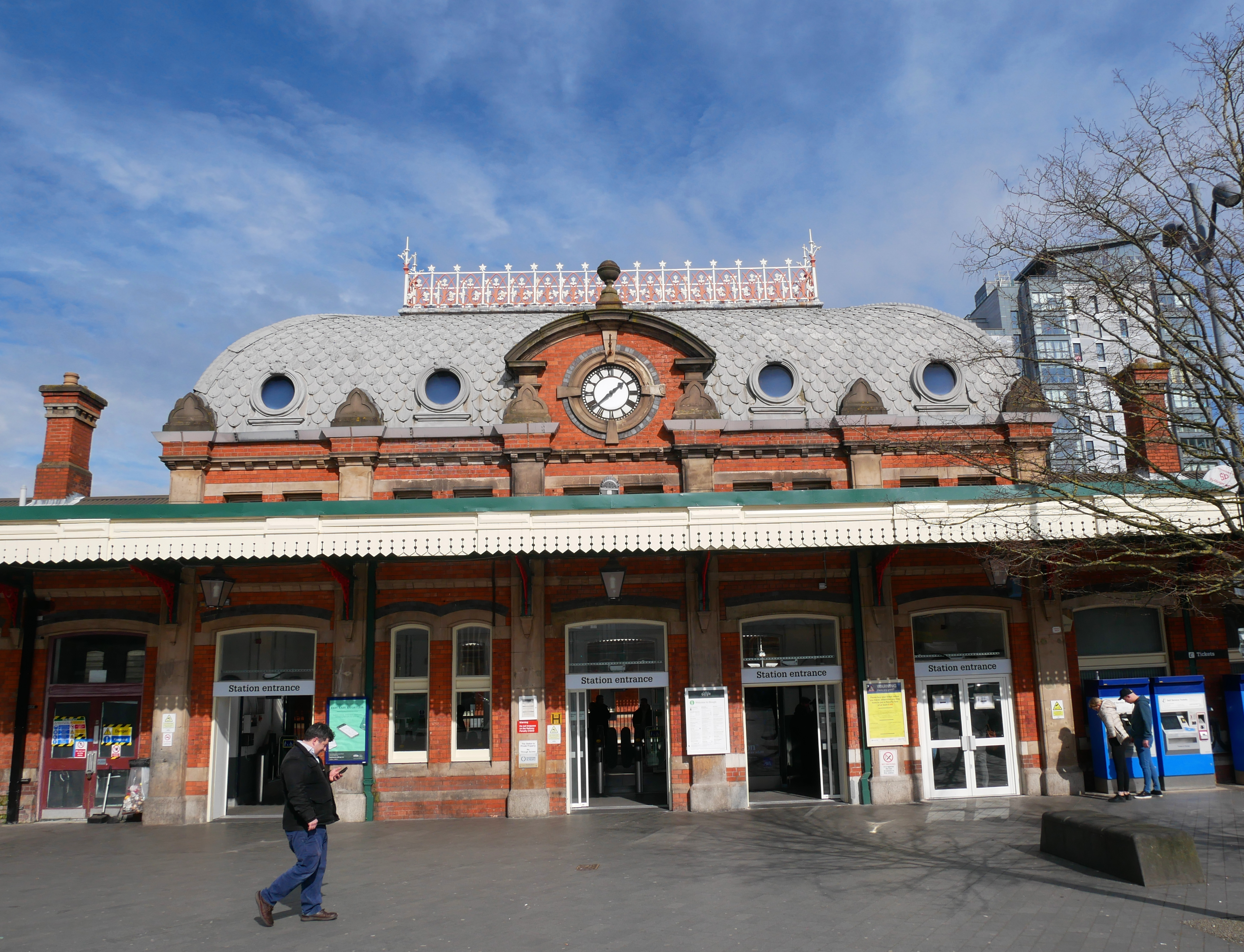
- Station entrance seen in 2024

General information
- Location: Borough of Slough; England
- Coordinates: 51.512°N 0.592°W
- Grid reference: SU978801
- Owner: Network Rail
- Manager: Great Western Railway
- Platforms: 5

Other information
- Station code: SLO
- Classification: DfT category C1

History
- Original company: Great Western Railway

Key dates
- 4 June 1838: Line opened
- 1 June 1840: Station opened
- 8 September 1884: Station re-sited

Passengers
- 2021/22: ▲3.513 million
- Interchange: ▲0.775 million
- 2022/23: ▲4.528 million
- Interchange: ▲1.322 million
- 2023/24: ▲5.384 million
- Interchange: ▼1.304 million
- 2024/25: ▲5.504 million
- Interchange: ▼1.278 million
- 2025/26: ▲5.602 million
- Interchange: ▲1.311 million
Location
Notes
- Passenger statistics from the Office of Rail and Road

Slough railway station, in Slough, Berkshire, England, is on the Great Western Main Line, halfway between London Paddington and Reading. It is 18 miles 36 chains (18.45 mi; 29.7 km) down the line from the zero point at Paddington and is situated between Langley to the east and Burnham to the west. The station is just to the north of the town centre, on the north side of the A4.

It is served by Great Western Railway, with services to Paddington, Reading, Oxford, and Didcot Parkway; and by the Elizabeth line on local services between Abbey Wood and Reading. It is the terminus for trains from Windsor on the Windsor branch.

== History ==
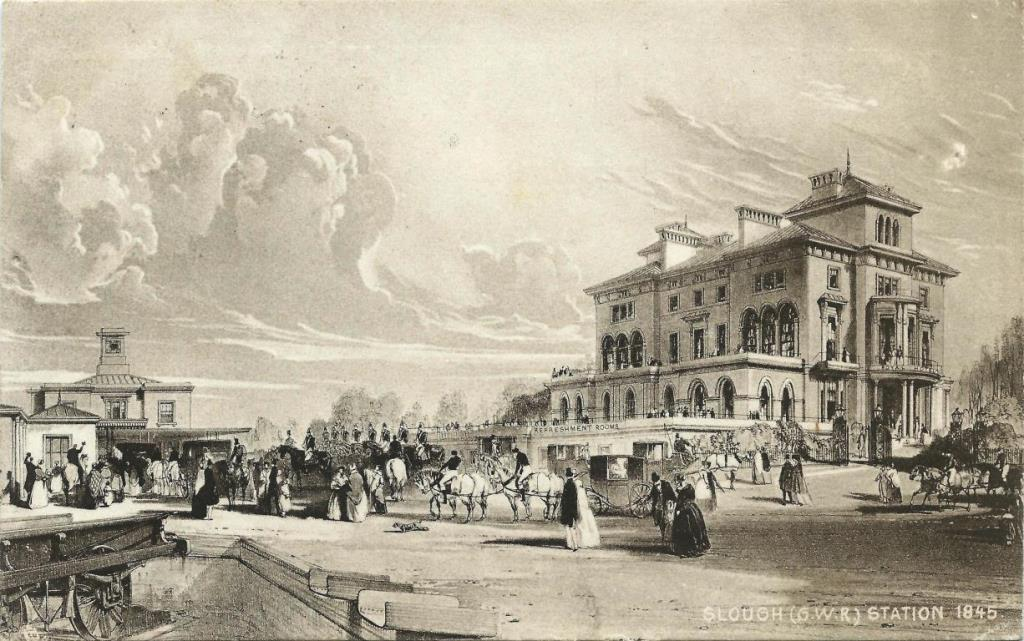
Slough station (left) in 1845

The first section of the Great Western Railway (GWR), between the original station at Paddington and the original station at Maidenhead, opened on 4 June 1838, but although trains stopped at Slough, there was no actual station: tickets were sold at the Crown Inn. This was because the Act which authorised the construction of the GWR forbade the construction of a station within 3 miles (4.8 km) of Eton College without the permission of the Provost and Fellows of the school but did not explicitly prevent trains from stopping for passengers. Following the repeal of the relevant clauses in the GWR Act, the first proper station at Slough opened on 1 June 1840. The arrival of the railway led to Queen Victoria making her first railway journey, from Slough to Bishop's Bridge near Paddington, in 1842. Later, a branch to Windsor & Eton Central was built for the Queen's greater convenience. As of January 2025, the journey time between Windsor and Slough is six minutes.

Originally, the headmaster of Eton College, Dr John Keate, had resisted efforts to place a station closer to Eton College than Slough, because he feared that it would "interfere with the discipline of the school, the studies and amusements of the boys, affecting the healthiness of the place, from the increase of floods, and endangering even the lives of boys." This led to Slough station becoming, temporarily at least, the Royal Station. It is much bigger and grander than other stations in the area to accommodate its role at the time.

Windsor & Eton Central railway station (served from Slough) and Windsor & Eton Riverside railway station (served from Staines) both opened in 1849 despite the opposition from the college.

Its approach road, Mackenzie Street, which ran from the Great West Road to the station, was much wider than an approach road would otherwise have needed to have been. This was to accommodate the Queen's carriages and entourage. Slough High Street was originally part of the Great West Road, which has now been diverted via Wellington Street, allowing the High Street to be largely pedestrianised. Thus Mackenzie Street became a cul-de-sac in 1970 when Wellington Street was redeveloped, and is now part of the Queensmere Shopping Centre. The remainder of Mackenzie Street, north of the redeveloped Wellington Street, was (along with Station Approach) renamed Brunel Way.

Opposite the railway station once stood the equally grand Royal Hotel (now demolished).

On 1 January 1845, John Tawell, who had recently returned from Australia, murdered his lover, Sarah Hart, at Salt Hill in Slough by giving her a glass of stout poisoned with cyanide of potash. With various officials in chase, Tawell fled to Slough Station and boarded a train to Paddington. The electric telegraph had been installed between Paddington and Slough in 1843, and a message was sent ahead to Paddington with Tawell's details. Tawell was trailed and subsequently arrested, tried and executed for the murder at Aylesbury on 28 March 1845. This is believed to be the first time that the telegraph had been involved in the apprehension of a murderer.

From 1 March 1883, the station was served by District Railway services running between Mansion House and Windsor & Eton Central. The service was discontinued as uneconomic after 30 September 1885.

On 8 September 1884 the original station was closed and replaced by the present station, situated 220 yards (200 m) to the west of the old.

=== 1900 accident ===
On 16 June 1900, an express train from Paddington to Falmouth Docks ran through two sets of signals at danger, and collided with a local train from Paddington to Windsor which was standing in the station. The driver of the express only noticed the signal immediately before the platform; he made an emergency brake application and reversed the engine, but was unable to prevent the collision. Five passengers on the local train were killed. The official enquiry ruled that a primary cause of the accident was the poor physical condition of the driver, due to his age (60 years) and fatigue; the accident was at 1:41 in the afternoon, and he had started duty at 05:00 that morning. The guard and fireman of the express were also criticised for failing to notice that their train had passed the danger signals. This accident was instrumental in the introduction of Automatic Train Control on the Great Western Railway.

=== 1941 accident ===
On 2 July 1941, an express train from Plymouth to Paddington hauled by GWR 4073 Class 4-6-0 No. 4091 Dudley Castle collided almost head-on with a freight train hauled by a LMS Stanier 8F 2-8-0 WD No. 407 (LMS 8293), at Dolphin Junction, 1 mile (1.6 km) east of Slough. The express was in the process of crossing from the up main to up relief line via a diamond crossing. Five passengers were killed and 24 injured. The signalman was held to be at fault for allowing the express to cross in front of the heavy freight train (not fitted with continuous brakes) without ensuring that the latter could stop in time.

=== 1994 accident ===
On the evening of 2 November 1994 a Class 165 Turbo train crashed through the buffer stop of platform 6, after failing to slow down due to poor rail adhesion on the approach to the crossover. It is estimated that the train had only reduced its speed from 56 miles per hour (90 km/h) to approximately 30 miles per hour (50 km/h) at the time of collision, apparently skidding for some 1,200 yards (1,100 m) through three sets of points (which had approved speeds of 25 miles per hour (40 km/h) on the relief lines, 15 miles per hour (24 km/h) for the Platform 6 bay). Evidence gathered at the scene by investigators suggested that the train, had it not hit the buffers, could have continued for another 910 yards (830 m). There had been light drizzle on the evening in question.

This was only one of a number of instances in which Class 165/166 Turbo trains had overshot platforms and run through red lights. These incidents led to driver retraining and the teaching of defensive driving techniques during the autumn leaf fall season. The main contributing factor was the change of braking system from brake shoes (which effectively cleaned the wheel each time the brakes were applied) on the previous DMU fleet to disc brakes, which allow the mulch from the rails to adhere to the wheel, leading to poor rail adhesion. This also led to regular sanding of the rails on all lines affected.

== The station today ==
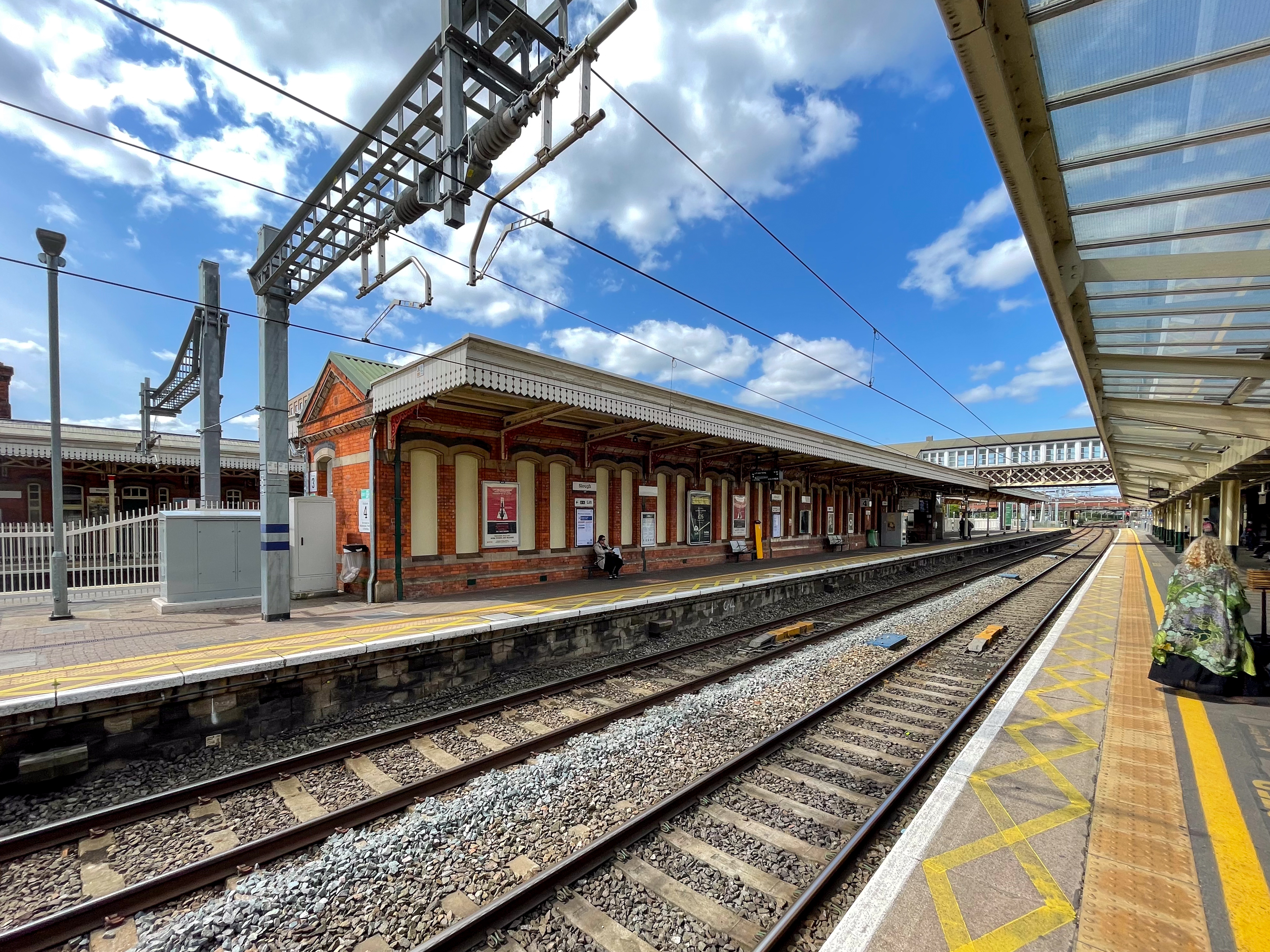
The station in 2023

In the Office of Rail and Road's statistics for 2017/18, the railway station has 5.544 million users every year making it the 88th busiest railway station in Great Britain. This figure does not take into account the 1.59 million additional users of the branch line to Windsor & Eton Central.

The station is a short walk from Slough bus station and has a taxi rank directly outside. It has a CCTV security monitoring network that runs all night. There are ticket barriers to both entrances situated on Platforms 2 (the main entrance, on the south side of the station) and 5 (on the northside), accepting both paper and mobile ticketing as well as contactless payment.

Significant changes took place during the 2010s, including: extensions to platforms 2–5 to accommodate longer trains of up to twelve cars; a second overbridge, with stairs and lift, serving all platforms; and the addition of a baby changing facility and parcels office. The station underwent other structural changes to accommodate overhead electrification of the Great Western Main Line. Platform awnings were pared back and platform 6 closed after several years of being out of use (following the withdrawal of Slough–London Paddington local services some years earlier, it had been used as a temporary siding for track machinery).

== Services ==
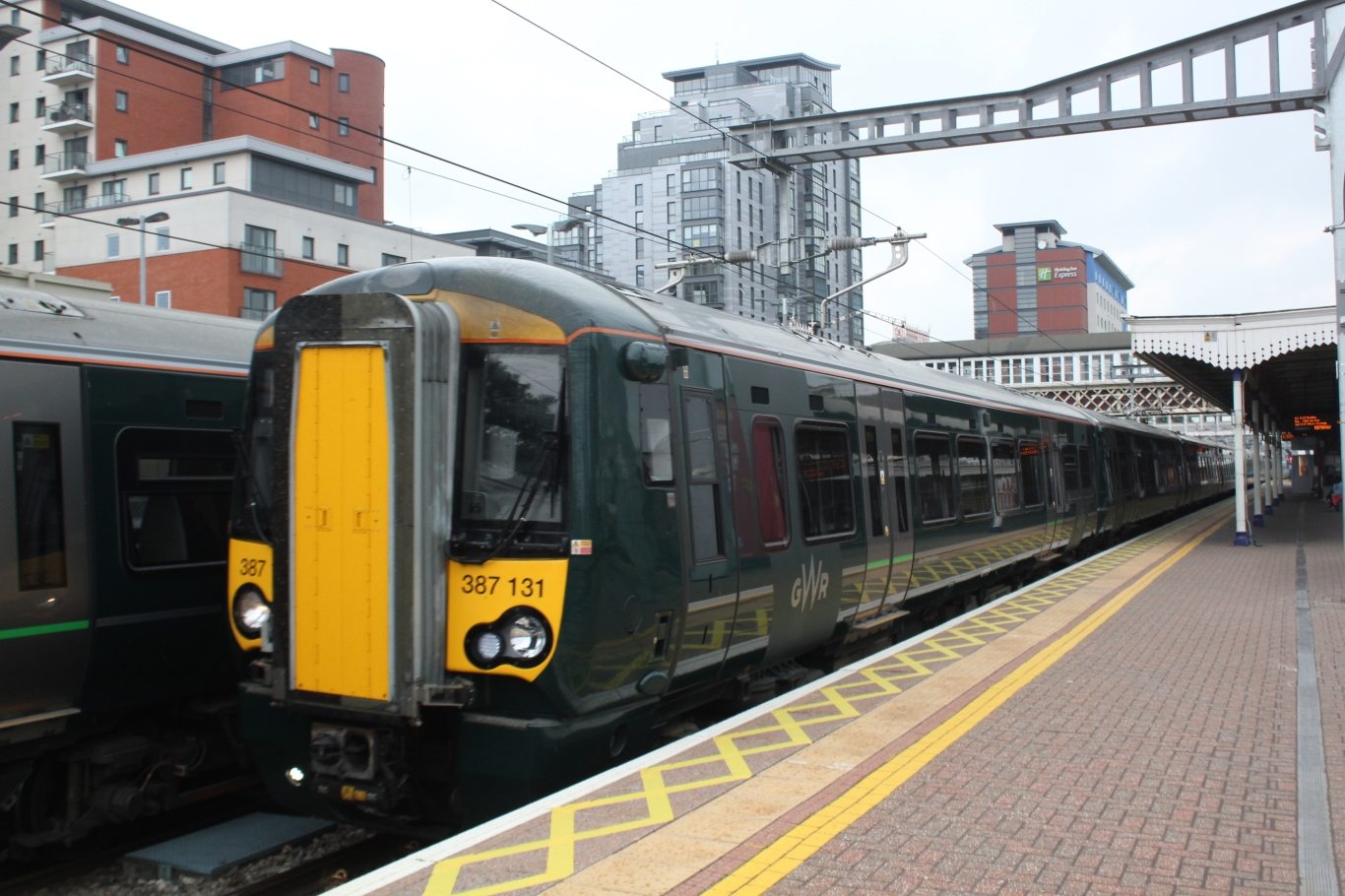
A GWR Class 387 at Slough

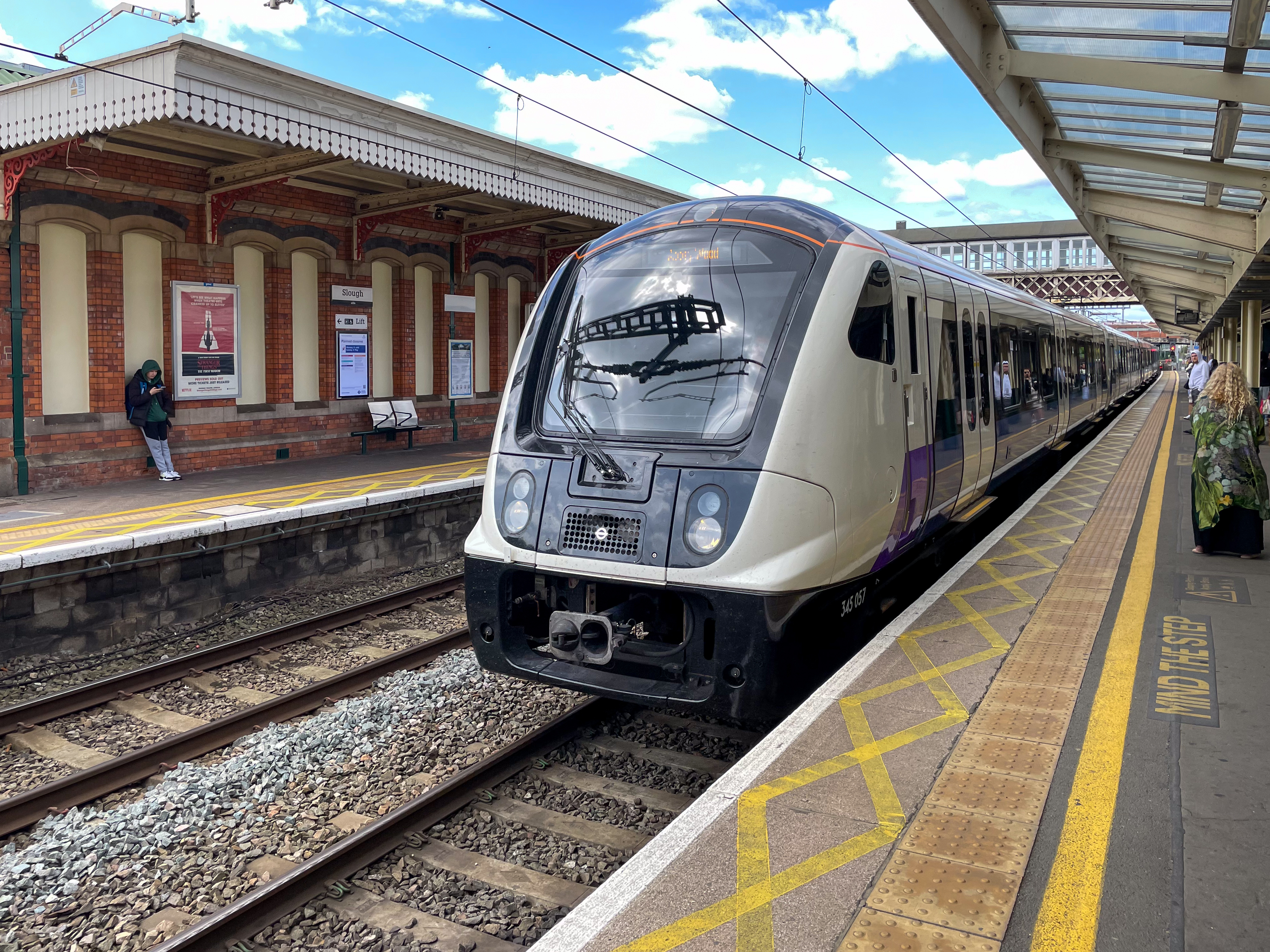
An Elizabeth line Class 345 at Slough

All services at Slough are operated by Great Western Railway and the Elizabeth line.

The typical off-peak service in trains per hour (tph) is:

=== Elizabeth Line ===
- 4 tph to Abbey Wood
- 4 tph to Maidenhead of which 2 continue to Reading

=== Great Western Railway ===
- 2 tph to Didcot Parkway
- 2 tph to London Paddington (non-stop)
- 3 tph to Windsor & Eton Central

Additional Elizabeth line services call at the station during the peak hours.

On Sundays, the semi-fast services between London Paddington and Didcot Parkway are reduced to hourly.

=== Service table ===
Preceding station	National Rail	Following station
Maidenhead	Great Western Railway Great Western Main Line	London Paddington
Windsor & Eton Central	Great Western Railway Windsor branch	Terminus
Preceding station	Elizabeth line	Following station
Burnham towards Reading	Elizabeth line	Langley towards Abbey Wood
	Historical railways	
Chalvey Halt Line open, station closed	Great Western Railway Windsor branch	Terminus
	Historical services	
Preceding station	LUL	Following station
Windsor Terminus	District line	Langley towards Mansion House

== Architecture ==
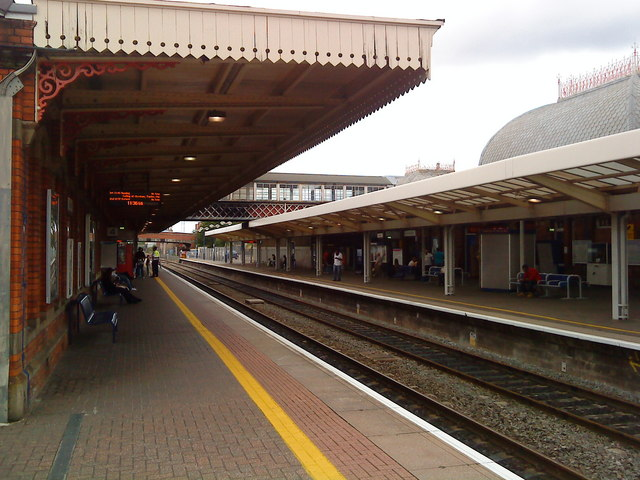
The 'relief' lines, used for local passenger trains towards Reading (Platform 4, left) and London Paddington (Platform 5, right)

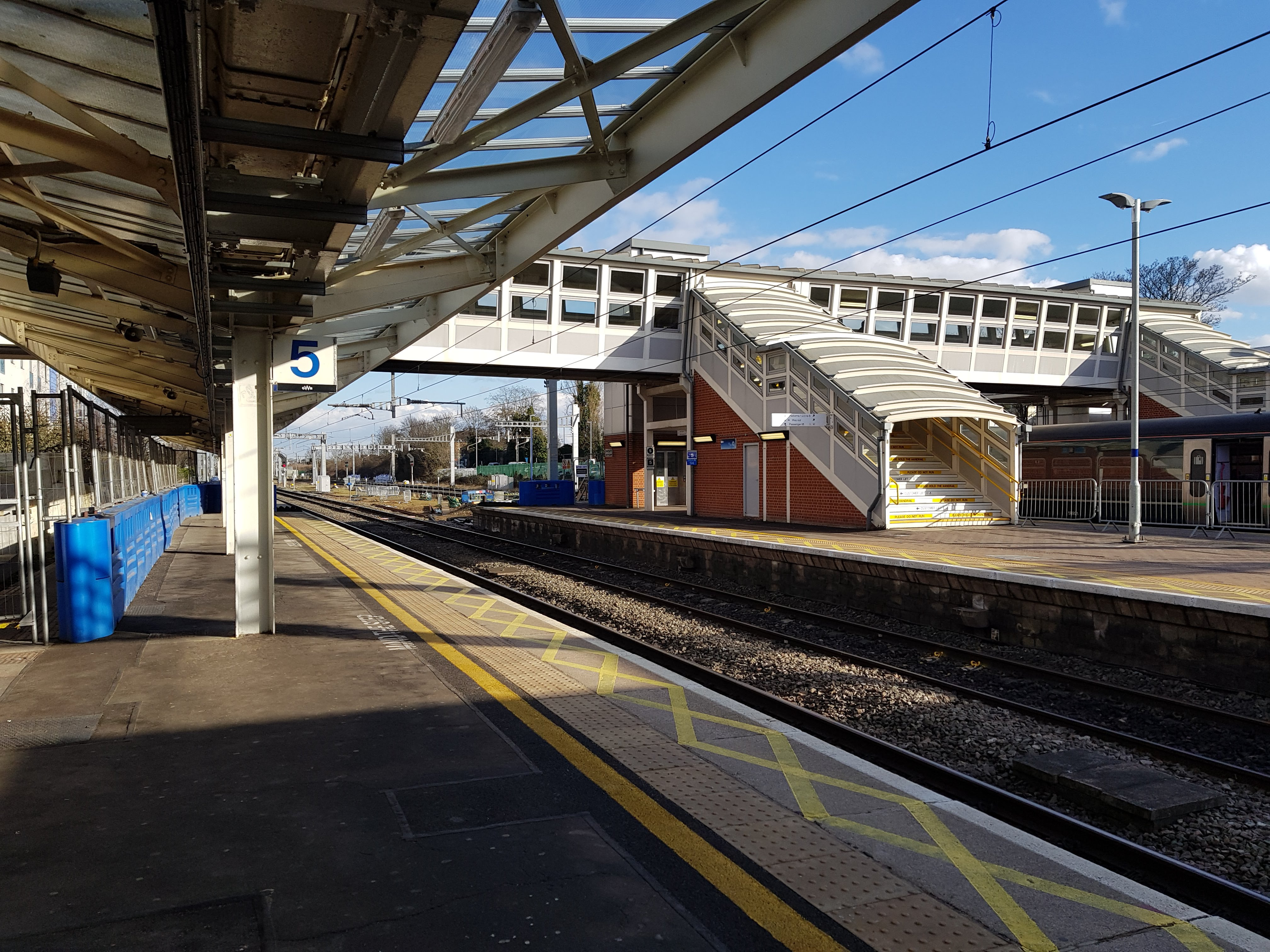
Looking the other way, from the western end of Platform 5. This view clearly shows the difference between the original GWR-pattern platform canopy (Platforms 4, 3, 2, right) and the modern (1960s) extension on Platform 5 (left) that was installed when the centre track (between the relief lines) was removed and the station remodelled.

The original Brunel-era station buildings at Slough were of timber construction and were on the south (i.e. town) side of the railway. Two platforms were provided, with matching buildings, each having an overall roof that covered both platform and track. These platforms served 'up' (London-bound) and 'down' (Bristol-bound) trains separately; a complicated arrangement of crossings between the platforms allowed the necessary train movements.

=== The present station ===
The station was rebuilt in 1882 in a "Second Empire" style and was designed by J E Danks. It is the fifth station to be built on the site. The buildings have survived largely intact, although some of the waiting room buildings on the island platform were demolished in the 1970s before the station was Grade II listed.

It is a near-unique design on the Great Western Railway, only one other, much smaller, station was built with the same features. The most notable architectural details are the unusual scalloped roof tiles and the decorative ironwork around the top of the buildings.

=== Evolution of station layout ===
Since the end of steam traction, the layout at Slough has been somewhat simplified. In its heyday, every corner of the station featured a siding or bay platform of some kind. Apparently inexplicable architectural clues remain around the station to show where these facilities were.

Parallel to and south of the current Platform 1, the 'Windsor Bay', were two additional sidings and a platform-level loading bank. These were latterly used for loading tanks, from the Royal Alexandra Barracks in Windsor, on to flat trucks (e.g., 'Rectank' and 'Warwell' wagons) for onward transport by rail. The sidings were removed in the 1980s and replaced by an access road, at track level, under the Stoke Road Bridge to the West Car Park – built on part of the engine shed site. One siding was the same length as the Windsor Bay line, and (as of 2009) its buffers are still in situ, even though the line itself has long since gone.

At the London end of Platform 2 ('Down Main' services) was a very short siding, at an odd angle to the track. This was probably used for loading carriages onto flat wagons. It was removed a long time ago.

Platform 6, for stopping services to London, was provided with a siding between the main and relief lines at the east end of the station. This was used for storing the local train between services. The siding was removed in the 1980s.

At the west end of Platform 5, which is on the north side of the station, were two long sidings alongside a loading bank. These were used to load vans and trucks manufactured at Ford's Langley factory onto flat wagons. In the 1970s, one siding was lifted and the area turned into a parcels bay, complete with awning. It was not uncommon to see several parcels vans stabled there, and occasionally a Class 08 shunter from Slough Goods Yard. This remaining siding was truncated beyond the end of the platform during the 1990s and is now used as a stabling point for a tamper/liner or similar kind of track machine.

There was another bay platform – at the west end of the station, between Platforms 3 and 4. Examination of the platform canopies at this point will reveal a gap where the canopies do not meet. This was where the bay platform track was, and the gap was to allow steam from the engines to escape. This bay platform was used for the shuttle service to the Trading Estate railway station on the Slough Trading Estate. The bay was taken out of use when services to the trading estate finished in 1956.

An ex-Great Western Railway building on the station site houses the headquarters of the Slough & Windsor Railway Society.

== "Station Jim" ==
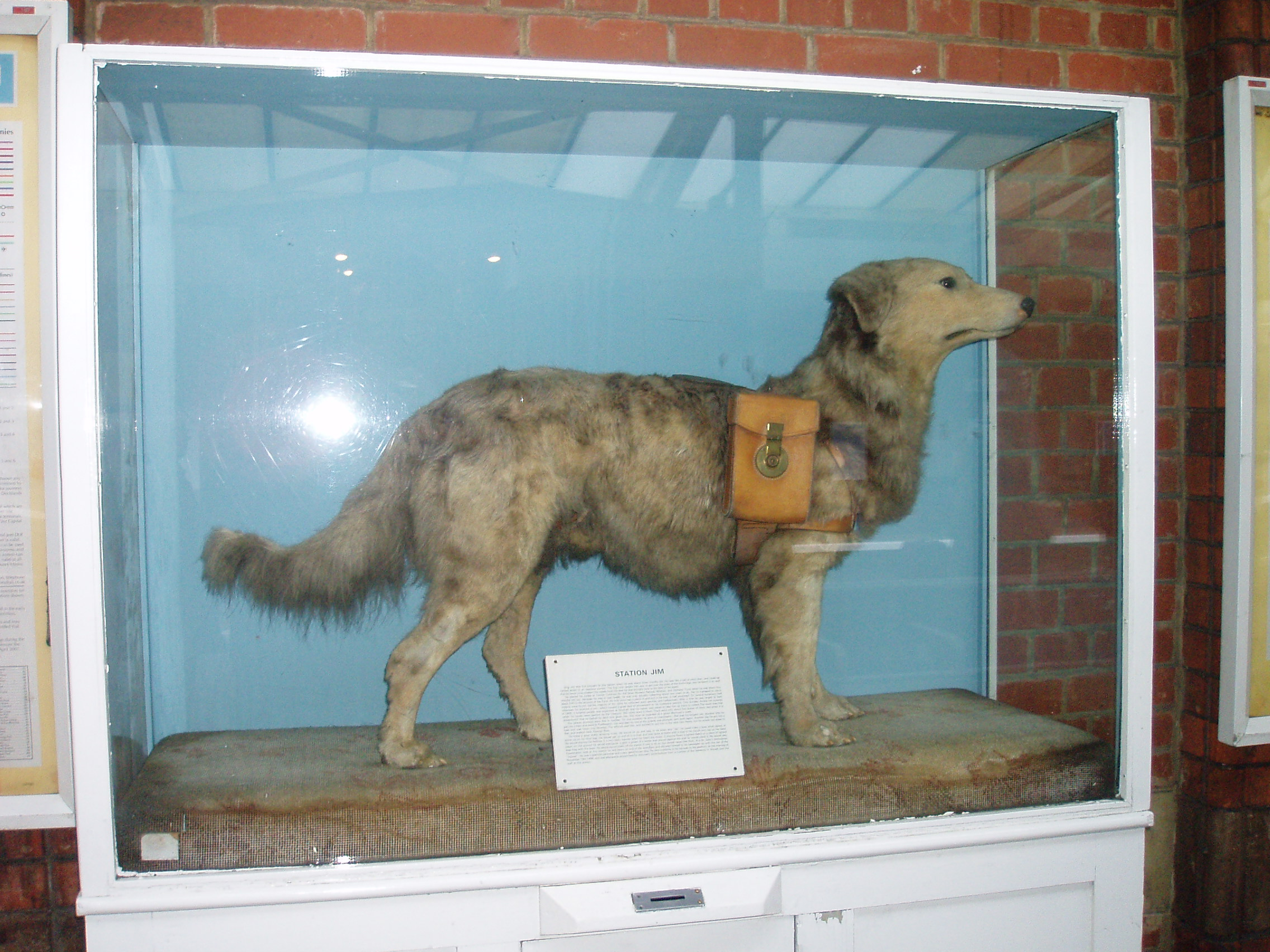
"Station Jim" in 2008

"Station Jim" (or Dog Jim), based at Slough railway station, was a Canine Collector for the Great Western Railway Widows and Orphans Fund from 1894 until his death in 1896. After his death he was stuffed and placed on display in a glass cabinet with a collection slot. Station Jim's display cabinet, which can be found on Platform 5, includes a copy of the original inscription, written after he died, that describes his life story:

Dog Jim was first brought to Slough station when he was about three months old. He was like a ball of wool then, and could be carried about in an overcoat pocket. The first trick taught him was to get over the stairs of the footbridge, and he learnt it so well that he never once crossed the metals from the time he was brought here to the time of his death.

He started his duties as Canine Collector for the Great Western Railway Widows' and Orphans' Fund when he was about four months old but, because he was in bad health, he was only actually collecting about two years or so. Yet he managed to place about £40 to the account of the Fund. He only once had a piece of gold put in his box — a half sovereign. On several occasions half crowns were found, but the majority of the coins he collected were pennies and halfpennies. After a time he was taught to bark whenever he received a coin, which caused a great deal of amusement to his numerous patrons. One Sunday during the summer of 1896, a hospital parade was organised at Southall, and his trainer was asked to take him up there to collect. The result was that when his boxes were opened by the Treasurer 265 coins were in them. There were only about five pieces of silver, but when it is remembered that he barked for each coin given him, this must be regarded as a good afternoon's work.

His railway journeys were few in number. On one occasion he went to Leamington; that was his longest ride. Another time he got into a train and went to Paddington, but was seen by one of the guards and promptly sent back again. Another day he got into a train and was taken into Windsor. The officials saw him, and wanted to put him in the next train home, but he would not agree to that, and walked back through Eton.

He knew a great many amusing tricks. He would sit up and beg, or lie down and "die"; he could make a bow when asked, or stand up on his hind legs. He would get up and sit in a chair and look quite at home with a pipe in his mouth and cap on his head. He would express his feelings in a very noisy manner when he heard any music. If anyone threw a lighted match or a piece of lighted paper on the ground he would extinguish it with a growl. If a ladder was placed against the wall he would climb it. He would play leap frog with the boys; he would escort them off the station if told to do so, but would never bite them. At a St. John Ambulance Examination held at this station he laid down on one of the stretchers and allowed himself to be bandaged up with the rest of the "injured". He was a splendid swimmer and a very good house dog. He died suddenly in his harness on the platform on the evening of 19 November 1896, and was afterwards placed here by voluntary contributions from a number of the residents in Slough and the staff at this station.

In 2025, he was removed for restoration by a team of conservators with backing from GWR, Museums Partnership Reading, Arts Council England and the Aldama Foundation. He was re-installed at the station in a new glass case on 11 December.

The story of the Slough "Station Jim" is mentioned in the historical background feature accompanying the BBC movie Station Jim (2001). Although the movie involves an orphanage, the movie dog and storyline are not based on the true story, and the movie is not set in Slough.
