= Roderick Oliver Redman =

- Education: St John's College, Cambridge
- Awards: Fellow of the Royal Society
- Scientific career
- Workplaces: University of Cambridge

Roderick Oliver Redman FRS (1905–1975) was Professor of Astronomy at the University of Cambridge.

== Education ==
Redman was born at Rodborough near Stroud, Gloucestershire and educated at Marling School and St John's College, Cambridge.

== Career ==
He was director of the University of Cambridge Observatories 1947–72. He had started his career at the Dominion Astrophysical Observatory (DAO) in Victoria, British Columbia 1928–31. He moved to Cambridge University, UK and was Assistant Director at the Solar Physics Observatory 1931–37. he was then Chief Assistant at the Oxford University Radcliffe Observatory outside Pretoria, South Africa from 1939–1947. Among his doctoral students were John Hutchings, Colin Scarfe, and Gordon Walker. He received his Ph.D. under the direction of Arthur Stanley Eddington in 1931. In 1946 he was elected a Fellow of the Royal Society.

From 1947 to 1972 he was Director of Combined Observatories. He served as president of the Royal Astronomical Society from 1959 to 1961.

== Honors ==
The inner main-belt asteroid 7886 Redman, discovered by Canadian astronomer David D. Balam in 1993, has been named in his memory, jointly with the astronomer Russell Ormond Redman. No relation except for their shared initials and the fact that both worked at the DAO during significant parts of their careers. The official naming citation was published on 10 June 1998 (M.P.C. 32095).
