= Slough bus station =

Bus station in Slough, United Kingdom

Coordinates: 51.5115°N 0.5928°W

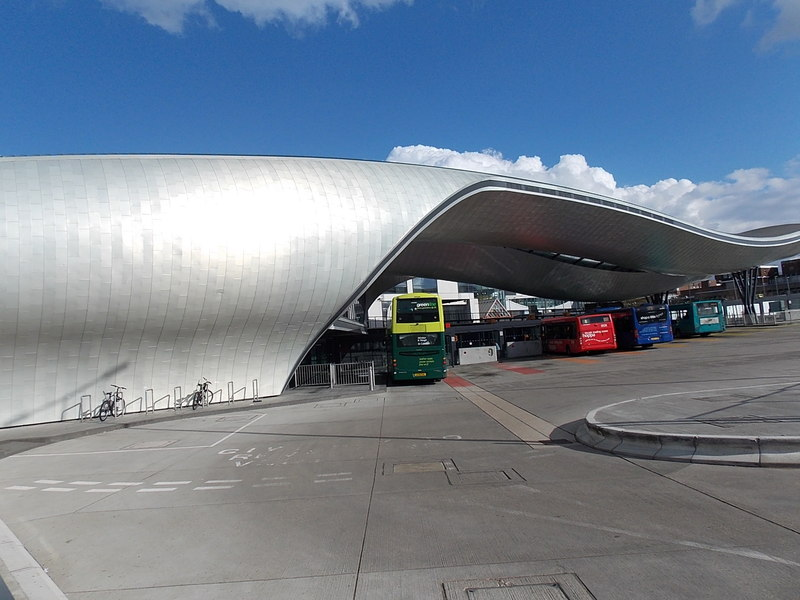
The present day bus station before the 2022 fire

Slough bus station was a bus station in Slough, United Kingdom. The derelict structure is adjacent to Slough railway station.

== History ==
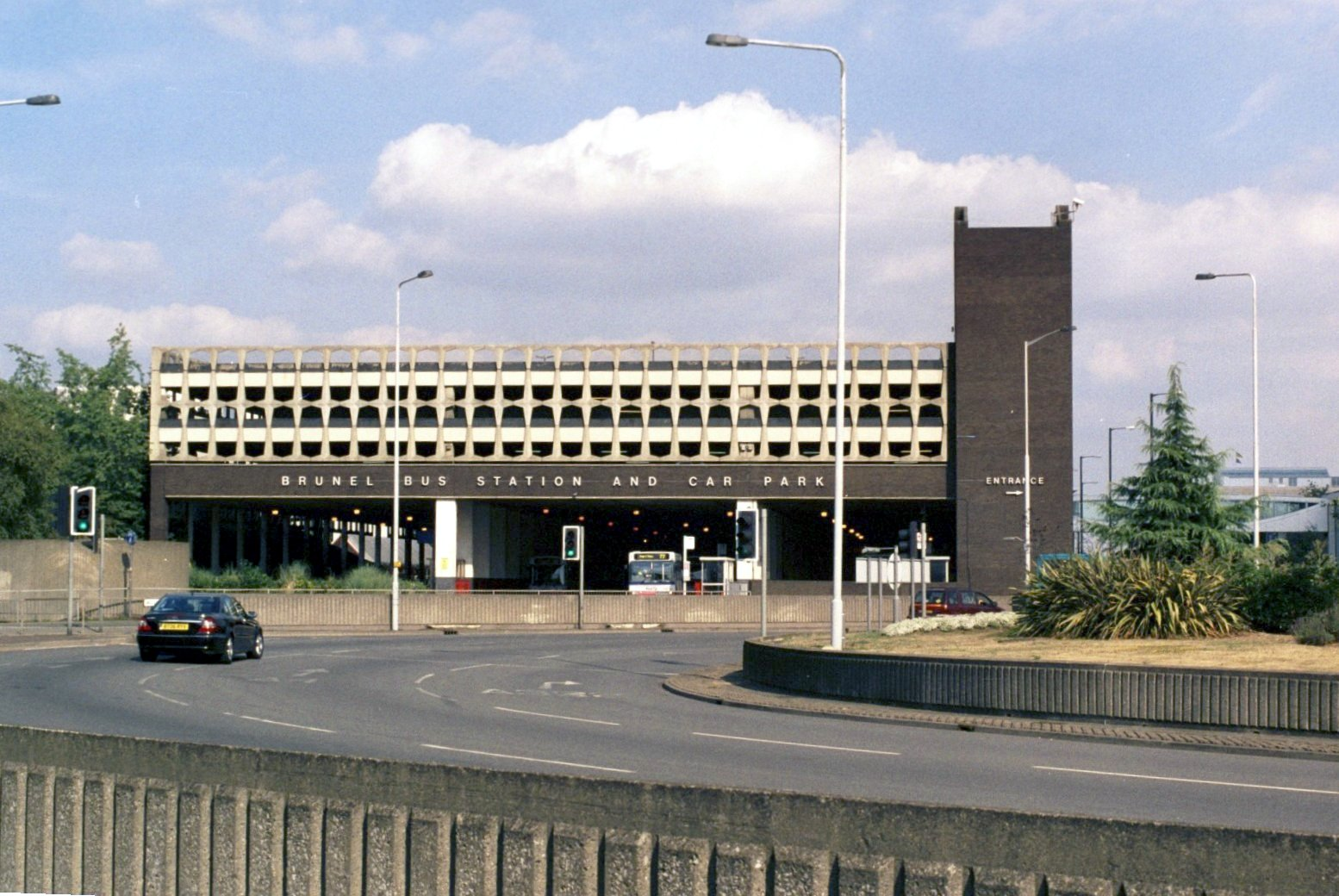
The 1970s bus station, demolished in 2010

Partial demolition of the former 1970s Slough bus station along with Compair House, a disused office block, began in February 2010 to allow for the construction of the new bus station, which started in March 2010. Services transferred from the old bus station to the new bus station on 28 May 2011.

The bus station was seriously damaged by a fire on 29 October 2022 which started from a parked bus and spread across the roof of the station, damaging three other buses that were being stored overnight and forcing bus operators to arrange temporary bus stands nearby. After lying derelict for several years, Slough Borough Council decided to sell the site to developers in January 2026.
