= Chalvey Halt railway station =

Former railway station in England

Chalvey Halt
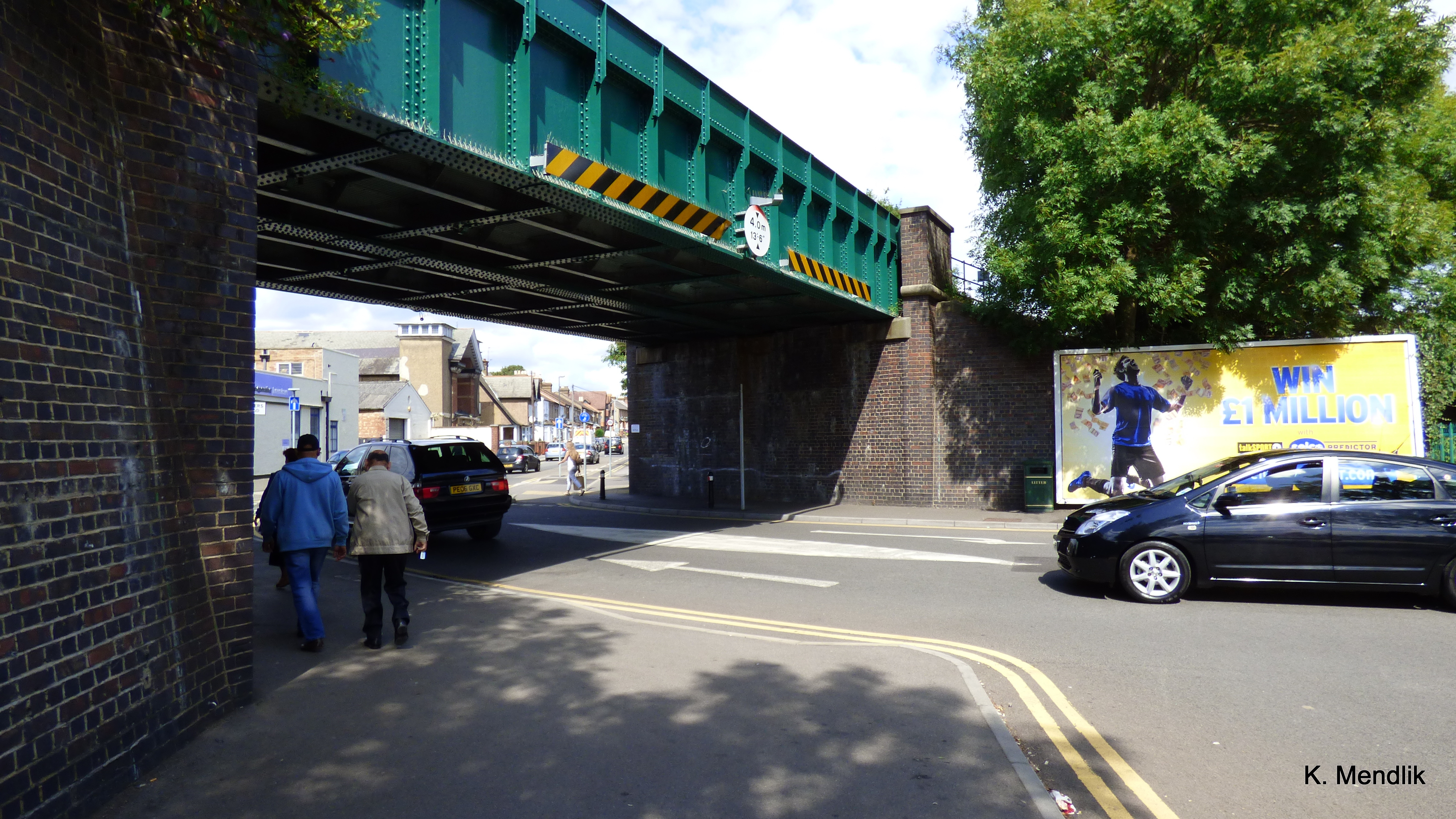
- Chalvey railway bridge, looking north.

General information
- Location: Chalvey, Slough; England
- Coordinates: 51.5075°N 0.6030°W
- Grid reference: SU970796
- Platforms: 2

Other information
- Status: Disused

History
- Original company: Great Western Railway
- Post-grouping: Great Western Railway

Key dates
- 8 October 1849: Windsor branch opened
- 6 May 1929: Station opened
- 6 July 1930: Station closed
Location

Chalvey Halt was a short-lived railway station on the Great Western Railway branch from Slough to Windsor & Eton. It was situated just to the north of the bridge carrying the railway over Chalvey Road in Chalvey, south-western Slough, England. It was open for just fourteen months.

== History ==
The branch line to Windsor had opened in 1849, but for many years there were no intermediate stations. On 6 May 1929 the Great Western Railway opened a halt in Chalvey one mile from Slough station adjacent to the bridge over Chalvey Road, in an attempt to draw local traffic. This did not materialise and the halt closed on 6 July 1930. The platforms were then used in the construction of Cashes Green Halt in Gloucestershire.

=== Revival ===
In 2010, there were plans to re-open this station connecting passengers from Slough to Heathrow. In October 2012, Slough Borough Council launched a consultation with local residents regarding the station's reopening as part of a regeneration strategy for the community.

Preceding station	Historical railways	Following station
Windsor & Eton; Line and station open	Great Western Railway; Windsor branch	Slough; Line and station open
