= Ebley =

Village in Gloucestershire, England

Coordinates: 51.7404°N 02.2522°W

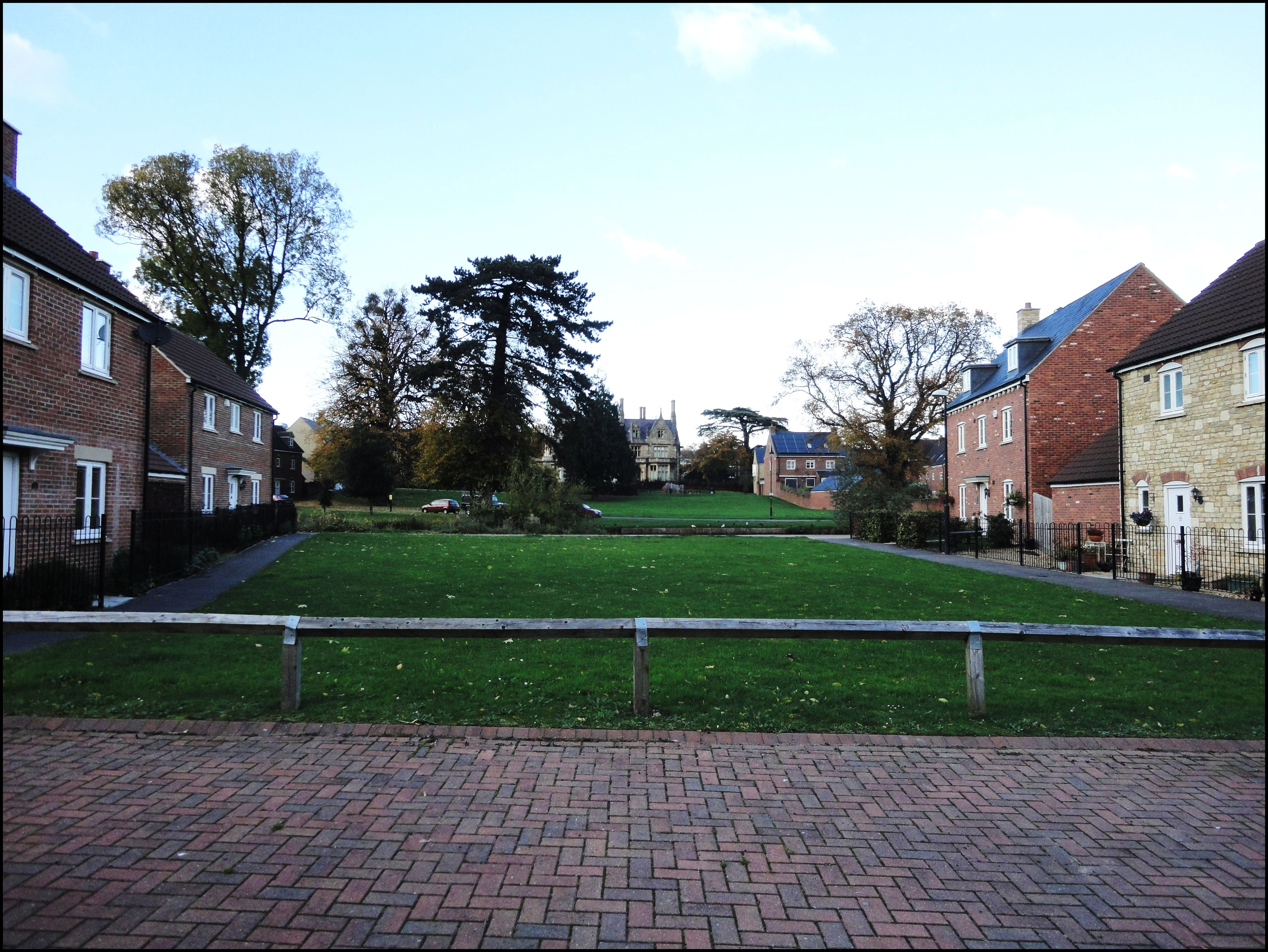

- Location within Gloucestershire
- OS grid reference: SO827047
- Civil parish: Cainscross
- District: Stroud
- Shire county: Gloucestershire
- Region: South West
- Country: England
- Sovereign state: United Kingdom
- Post town: Stroud
- Postcode district: GL5
- Dialling code: 01453
- Police: Gloucestershire
- Fire: Gloucestershire
- Ambulance: South Western
- UK Parliament: Stroud

Ebley is a historic village in the Stroud District of Gloucestershire, England. It lies in the valley of the River Frome, 2 miles west of Stroud. It is part of the civil parish of Cainscross.

Ebley was historically in the parish of Stonehouse. It became part of the parish of Cainscross when it was formed in 1894.

Ebley Mill, on the banks of the River Frome, was a woollen mill built in 1818. It is now a Grade II* listed building, and is used as the offices of Stroud District Council.

Ebley Chapel is a chapel of the Countess of Huntingdon's Connexion. It is a Grade II listed building.

Between 1903 and 1964, Ebley Crossing Halt served the village on what is now the Golden Valley Line.

== Notable people ==
- John Collins Bryant (1821–1901), an American physician and author
- William Vick (1833–1911), became a photographer in Ipswich.
- Henry William Carless Davis CBE FBA (1874–1928), a British historian and editor of the Dictionary of National Biography
