= Gloucester station (disambiguation) =

Gloucester station is a railway station in Gloucester, England.

Gloucester station may also refer to:

- Gloucester station (MBTA), in Gloucester, Massachusetts, United States
- Gloucester railway station, New South Wales, Australia

== See also ==
- Gloucester (disambiguation)
