= Gloucestershire Parkway railway station =

Proposed station in Gloucester, England

Coordinates: 51°52′22″N 2°11′41″W

Gloucestershire Parkway railway station is or was a proposed development in transport infrastructure for a semi-greenfield site surrounded by warehouse and light industry units 1.4 miles (2.3 km) east of Gloucester city centre (including its main railway station) which is on a major east–west spur line off the greater north-south Birmingham-to-Bristol line on which this station would be built. The proposed site is specifically by an intra-city (urban) part of the inceptive A40 road in an area known as Elmbridge Court, Gloucester, England.

== Specific proposal ==
If approved its 2006-submitted designs involve building:

- an interchange for buses to Gloucester and Cheltenham accommodating a park and ride service
- a 500-space car park.

In May 2007 the Department for Transport dismissed the above plans stating that several issues needed to be resolved. As of 2013 there has been no further development.

Following the General Election of 2024, new Gloucester MP Alex McIntyre (Labour) has been asked about the possibility of a new version of this station, to be called 'Gloucester Parkway' and to instead be built under Metz Way. This would mean re-signalling of Barnwood Junction at the south end, the loss of Gloucester Yard (which may be compensated by additional future space at Severn Tunnel) as well as new crossovers at the north of the station.

The design would be modelled on Worcestershire Parkway lower level with two platforms with an hourly stopping service for Cross Country trains only (Monday to Saturday) with the existing Gloucester station (likely to be renamed 'Gloucester Central' in order to reflect its proximity to the City Centre) being served by these trains on Sunday only - save for any future Newcastle to Cardiff Central services which would not need to stop at Gloucester Parkway.

Hourly northbound would include: Glasgow Central (via Edinburgh Waverley), Edinburgh Waverley, Newcastle with a possible early morning service to Manchester Piccadilly.

Hourly southbound services would include: Penzance, Plymouth, Paignton, Exeter St. Davids and Bristol Temple Meads with occasional extensions to Weston-super-Mare.

== See also ==
- Gloucester railway station
- Cheltenham Spa railway station
- Gloucestershire County Council bus transport services.
