= Haresfield =

Village in Gloucestershire, England

Coordinates: 51.790°N 2.271°W

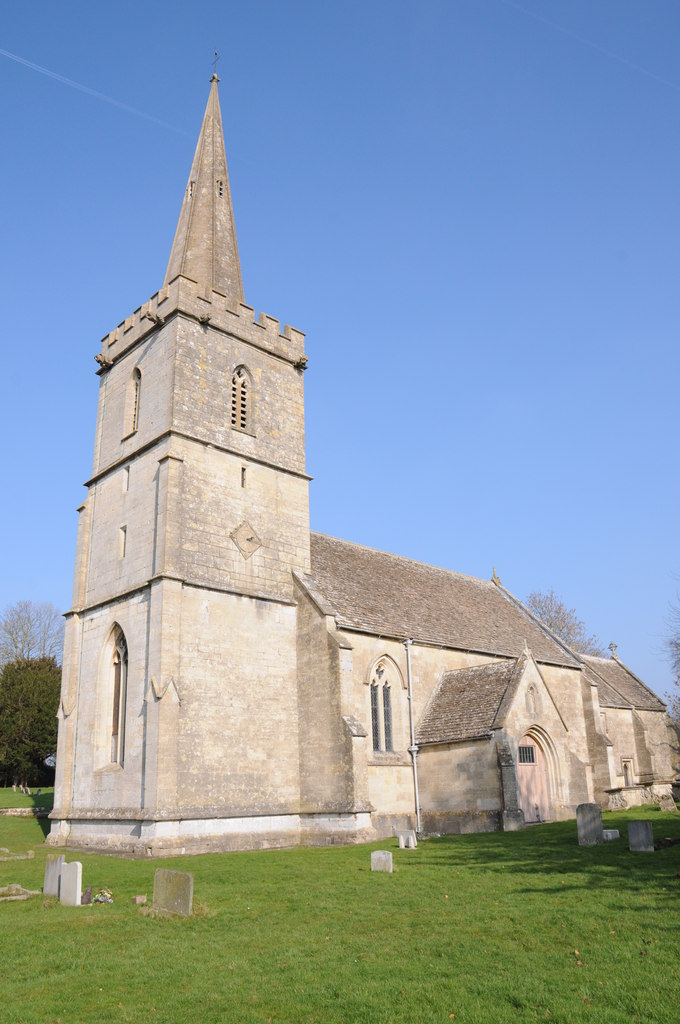
- St Peter's Church, Haresfield

- Location within Gloucestershire
- Population: 378 (2011 Census)
- District: Stroud
- Shire county: Gloucestershire
- Region: South West
- Country: England
- Sovereign state: United Kingdom
- Post town: Stonehouse
- Postcode district: GL10
- Police: Gloucestershire
- Fire: Gloucestershire
- Ambulance: South Western
- UK Parliament: Stroud

Haresfield is a village near Gloucester, Gloucestershire, England around one mile from Junction 12 of the M5 motorway and between the villages of Brookthorpe, Harescombe and Hardwicke. The population of the village taken at the 2011 census was 378.

The Mount, a moated site to the west of the current village may have been the site of the earliest settlement. The church was built nearby in the mid-12th century, while the village developed to the east.

Haresfield today is a largely residential village with a pub, The Beacon Inn. The church, which is dedicated to St Peter, is apart from the village itself and accessed by a public right of way on a private drive. Haresfield Court (originally Moat Place) was built c.1676 and enlarged in 1869 by the local architect Francis Niblett. It was converted to flats in the 1980s. The village was formerly served on the Bristol and Gloucester Railway by Haresfield railway station.

A tune 'Haresfield' by John Dykes Bower 1905-1981 appears in Hymns Ancient & Modern New Standard #511 for the hymn 'The great Creator of the worlds' by Francis Bland Tucker, American hymnwriter 1895-1984.
