= Haresfield railway station =

Railway station in Gloucestershire, England

Haresfield
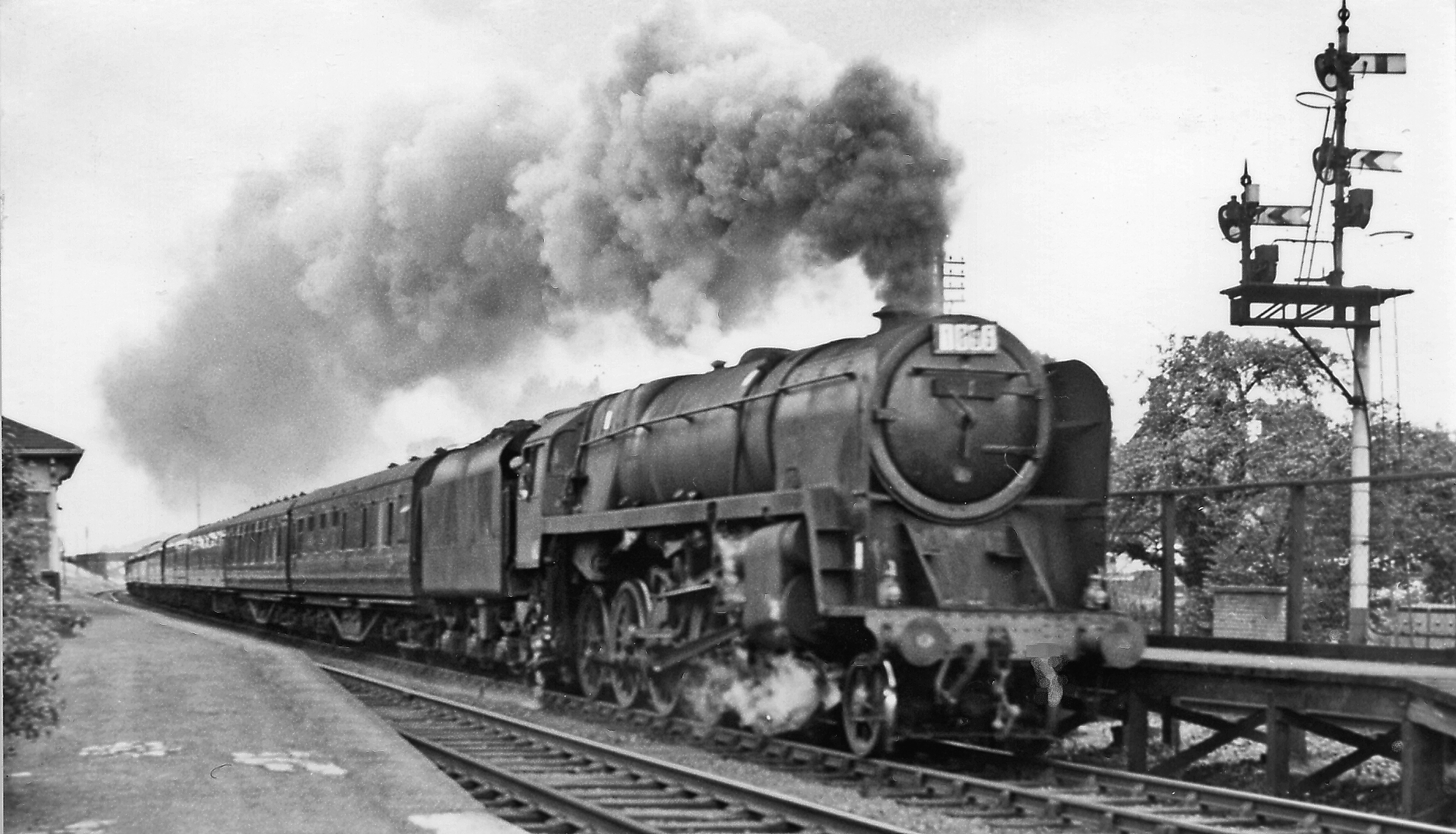
- Station in 1961 with BR Standard Class 9F 92151 working the Pines Express.

General information
- Location: Haresfield, Stroud; England
- Coordinates: 51.7883°N 2.2737°W
- Platforms: 2

Other information
- Status: Disused

History
- Original company: Midland Railway
- Pre-grouping: Midland Railway
- Post-grouping: London, Midland and Scottish Railway

Key dates
- 29 May 1854: Station opened
- 4 January 1965: Station closed
Location

Haresfield railway station served the village of Haresfield in Gloucestershire, England.

== History ==
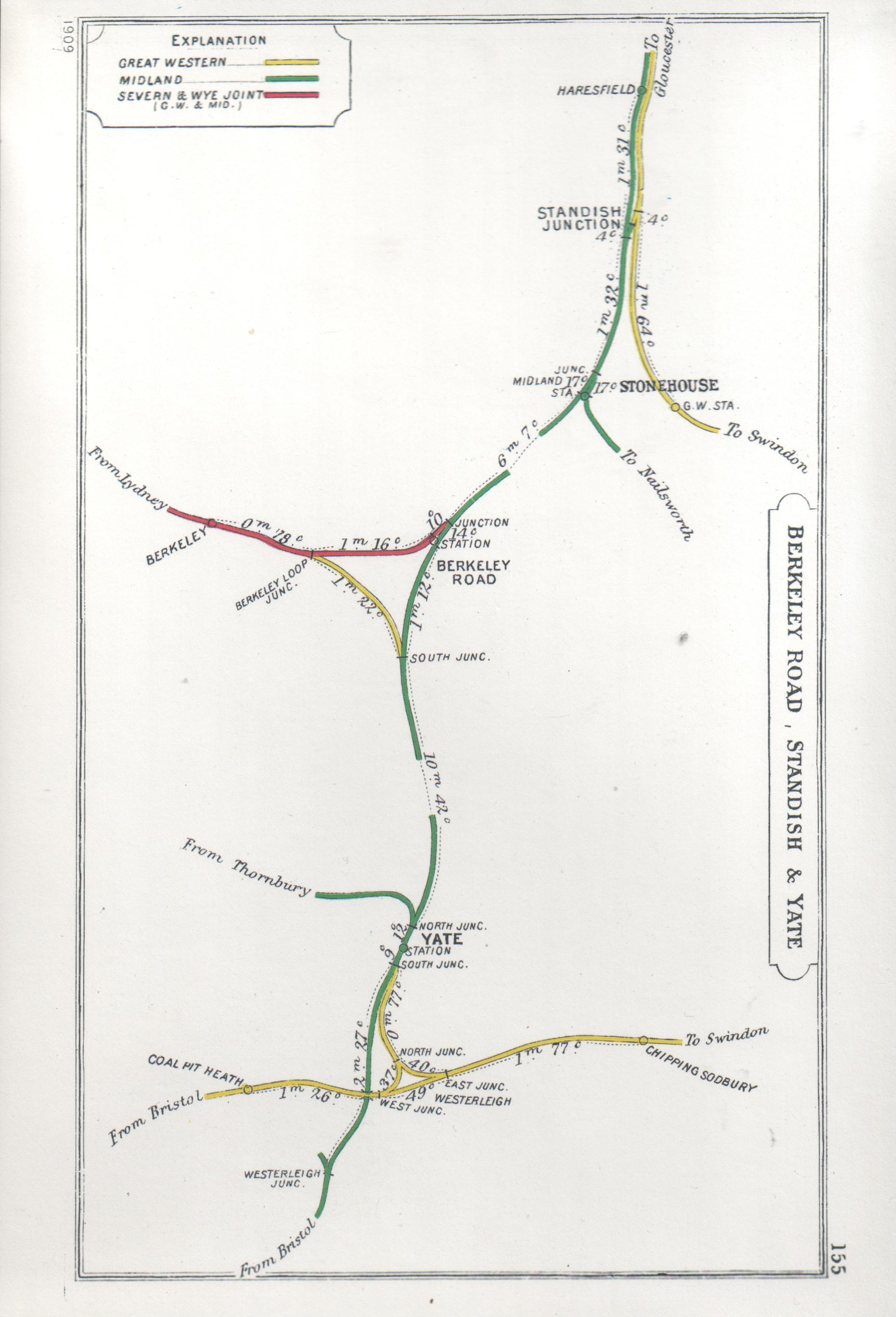
A 1909 Railway Clearing House map of railways in the vicinity of Haresfield (top right)

The station opened on 29 May 1854 on the Bristol and Gloucester Railway while converting from broad gauge to the standard gauge used by its new owner, the Midland Railway.

Haresfield served only the Midland Railway despite Great Western Railway's (GWR) Swindon to Gloucester services running on parallel tracks. Passengers at the Haresfield station were not able to board passing GWR trains, as the GWR never built a station there.

Haresfield never provided any freight facilities and it closed to passenger services on 4 January 1965 along with other stations on the Bristol to Gloucester line. Today, the four tracks (two Midland and two GWR) have been realigned and no trace of the station remains.

== Services ==
Preceding station	Disused railways	Following station
Stonehouse (Bristol Road); Line open, station closed	Midland Railway; Bristol and Gloucester Railway	Gloucester; Line and station open
Stonehouse (Bristol Road); Line open, station closed	Midland Railway; Bristol and Gloucester Railway	Gloucester Eastgate; Line and station closed
