= Gloucester (disambiguation) =

Gloucester is a city and the county town of Gloucestershire, United Kingdom. It may also refer to:

== Places ==
=== Australia ===
- Gloucester, New South Wales, a town
  - Gloucester River, a river near the town
  - Gloucester Shire, a former local government area in New South Wales
  - Gloucester Tops, a monolithic plateau located adjacent to the Barrington Tops National Park

=== Canada ===
- Gloucester County, New Brunswick
  - Gloucester (federal electoral district), renamed to Acadie—Bathurst
  - Gloucester (provincial electoral district)
- Gloucester, Ontario
- Gloucester Township, Ontario

=== England ===
- Gloucestershire, a county
- Gloucester Avenue, London
- Gloucester Place, London
- Gloucester Road, London
- Gloucester Terrace, London
- Gloucester (UK Parliament constituency)

=== Hong Kong ===
- Gloucester Road, Hong Kong

=== Papua New Guinea ===
- Gloucester Rural LLG, New Britain
- Cape Gloucester (Papua New Guinea), New Britain

=== United States ===
(by state)

- Gloucester, Massachusetts
- Gloucester (Natchez, Mississippi), listed on the National Register of Historic Places
- Gloucester City, New Jersey
  - Gloucester Point Grounds, the former baseball grounds for the Philadelphia Athletics
- Gloucester County, New Jersey
- Gloucester Township, New Jersey
- Gloucester County, New York
- Gloucester, North Carolina
- Gloucester County, Virginia
- Gloucester Courthouse, Virginia
- Gloucester Point, Virginia

== Boats and ships ==
- Gloucester 16, an American sailboat design
- Gloucester 19, an American sailboat design
- HMS Gloucester or Glocester, various ships of Britain's Royal Navy
- MV Gloucester

== People with the surname ==
- John Gloucester (1776–1822), American Presbyterian minister
- Stephen H. Gloucester (1802–1850), an organizer for the Underground Railroad

== Titles ==
- Duke of Gloucester, a title in Peerage of the United Kingdom
- Earl of Gloucester, a title created several times in the Peerage of the United Kingdom

== Other uses ==
- Gloucester (typeface), a version of the Cheltenham display typeface from Monotype
- Gloucester Cathedral, in Gloucester, England
- Gloucester cattle, a breed of dairy and beef cattle
- Gloucester cheese, a British cheese
- Gloucester College, Oxford, a former college in England
- Gloucestershire Old Spots, a breed of pig sometimes referred to as a "gloucester"
- Gloucester Rugby, a professional rugby union team from the English city of the same name

== See also ==
- Glocester, Rhode Island, United States
- Gloster (disambiguation)
- Glouster, Ohio, United States
- New Gloucester, Maine, United States
