= Gloster =

Gloster may refer to:

== People with the surname ==
- Elizabeth Gloster (born 1949), English judge
- J. Gary Gloster (born 1936), American bishop in The Episcopal Church
- John Gloster (born before 1998), Australian physiotherapist who works with cricket teams
- Tracey Gloster, British biochemist

== People with the given name ==
- Gloster Richardson (born 1942), American football player
- Gloster Udy (1918–2003), Australian Uniting Church minister and author

== Places ==
- Actis, California (formerly Highberg, Rummington, and Gloster), an unincorporated community in Kern County
- Gloster, Georgia, an unincorporated community
- Gloster, Louisiana, an unincorporated community and census-designated place in DeSoto Parish
- Gloster, Mississippi, a town in Amite County
- Gloster River, in the Marlborough region of New Zealand
- Gloster House, an historic house in County Offaly, Ireland

== Other uses ==
- Gloster Aircraft Company, British aircraft manufacturer 1917–63
  - Category:Gloster aircraft
- Gloster Southern Railroad, in Mississippi and Louisiana
- Gloster, an apple cultivar
- MG Gloster, a sport utility vehicle sold by SAIC Motor in India

== See also ==
- "The Mary Gloster", an 1890s poem by Rudyard Kipling
- Gloucester (disambiguation)
