= Stephen H. Gloucester =

American Underground Railroad organizer

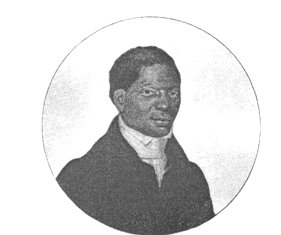
- Born: 1802
- Died: May 21, 1850 (aged 47–48); Reading, Pennsylvania, USA

Stephen Gloucester (c. 1802–1850) was an organizer of the Underground Railroad in Philadelphia.

== Slavery ==
Stephen Gloucester was one of the four sons of John Gloucester. Stephen was born a slave in Tennessee, his father paid $400 ($6,143 in 2025) for Stephen's freedom when he was 12 years of age.

== Community organizer ==
Between 1820 and 1840, Reverend Gloucester ran a school for black children and established a reading room for black adults. He organized the Leavitt Anti-Slavery Society and encouraged black churches to start similar groups, and was one of eight black pastors who founded the American and Foreign Anti-Slavery Society. In 1838, he became a co-publisher and co-proprietor of the Colored American. He became the pastor of the Second African Presbyterian after its previous pastor died. A mob destroyed Second African Presbyterian in the 1842 race riots.

== Controversy ==
In 1844, Gloucester became the founding pastor at Lombard Street Central Presbyterian Church - a church that was formed after the congregation of Second Presbyterian split into two factions. This schism with other activists led Gloucester to concentrate on his church, which moved into the white, Greek Revival-style building on the 800 block of Lombard upon its completion in 1848. The church eventually dropped the "street" in its name and became known as Lombard Central Presbyterian.

Frederick Douglass is said to have called Gloucester "one of the vilest traitors to his race that ever lived."

== Death and burial site ==
In 1850, while on a church-related trip to Reading, Gloucester died of pneumonia. Gloucester's congregation buried him in a brick vault in the front of the building he had raised money to construct.

There they placed a marble obelisk, inscribed:

Rev. Stephen Henry Gloucester
First Pastor of the Lombard St. Central Presbyterian Church
Died May 21, 1850
Aged 48
Erected by the Congregation and Citizens among whom he labored, as an expression of esteem and affection for him – a devoted and successful minister of Jesus Christ.

In 1880, Ann Gloucester died, and her remains were placed with her husband in the brick vault.

At some point since an 1895 photograph was taken, the large obelisk that marked the Gloucesters' grave went missing.

In 1939, the congregation outgrew their original church, which is on the National Register of Historic Places, and moved to a historic former Quaker meeting house on Powelton Avenue in West Philadelphia.

In the summer of 2008, a couple who had bought the property was in the process of converting the worn-out structure into a 10,000-square-foot (930 m^{2}) luxury home they hope to sell for $4.95 million (~$7.06 million in 2024). Workers hit a piece of slate which turned out to be his brick tomb. On Friday November 21, 2008, his remains were found. Mooney, an archeologist, said in an email Saturday, November 22, 2008, that all evidence at the site backs up the documentary evidence that the vault contained the remains of the Gloucesters and Winrow. Forensic details are forthcoming.
