= John Gloucester =

The Reverend John Gloucester
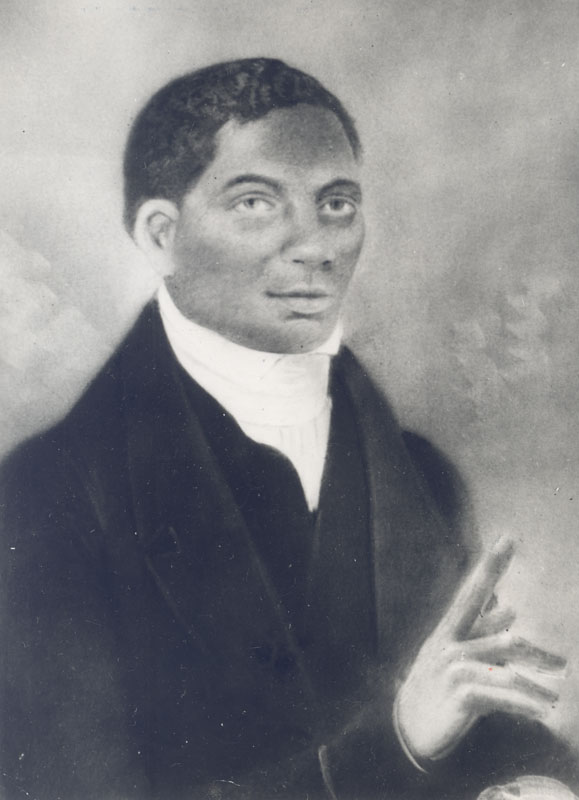
- Born: Jack; 1776; Tennessee
- Died: 1822 (aged 45–46); Philadelphia
- Education: Greeneville College (1806, First African-American student)
- Occupation: Presbyterian minister
- Known for: Founder of the 1st African Presbyterian Church
- Spouse: Rhoda
- Children: John Jr.; Jeremiah; Stephen; Mary; James

John Gloucester (1776 – 1822) was the first African American to become an ordained Presbyterian minister in the United States, and the founder of The First African Presbyterian Church at Girard Avenue and 42nd Street in Philadelphia, which had 123 members by 1811.

== Biography ==
The story of John Gloucester was extracted from Octavius Catto's book A Semi-Centenary Discourse.

Gloucester was born with the first name Jack in 1776 as a slave in Tennessee. At an early age, he converted other slaves to Christianity. He was taught theology by the Reverend Gideon Blackburn, who "purchased" Jack and freed him in 1806. At 30 years old, Jack took the name John Gloucester.

Following his freedom, he requested a licence to preach to Africans to the Presbyter of the Union in East Tennessee. He was sent to Greeneville College where he was the first African-American to attend the school. In 1807, based on Gloucester's ambitions, the Presbytery of the Union Synod of Tennessee recognized that a "slave should be licensed to preach among colored people".

John Gloucester arrived with Gideon Blackburn in Philadelphia in 1807. He began preaching at a house on Gaskill Street. His congregation grew and eventually moved to the corner of 7th and Shippen (now Bainbridge) Streets. The First African Presbyterian Church was founded in 1807 and built on this spot in May 1811. Gloucester preached his first official sermons to a congregation of 123 people. He then spent two years in Charleston, South Carolina, and came back to Philadelphia as a missionary in 1809. He was sent back to Tennessee and was ordained on 13 April 1810 at Baker's Creek Presbyterian Church.

From 1815 to 1822, he was the mentor of Samuel Cornish who spent his formative years in Philadelphia.

He served the First African Presbyterian Church of Philadelphia until he died of pneumonia in 1822.

== Personal life ==
John Gloucester was married to Rhoda. They had 5 children: John Jr., Jeremiah, Stephen, Mary, and James. The first four children all became Presbyterian ministers, 3 formed their own congregations. His family was enslaved up until 1810, when he was able to gather $1500 to buy them and bring them to Tennessee.

== Memorials ==
The Presbytery of Boston, Massachusetts manages the John Gloucester Memorial Scholarships for Presbyterian college students.

== See also ==
- Stephen H. Gloucester
