= Gloucester Eastgate railway station =

Former railway station in England

Coordinates: 51.8632°N 2.2367°W

Gloucester Eastgate
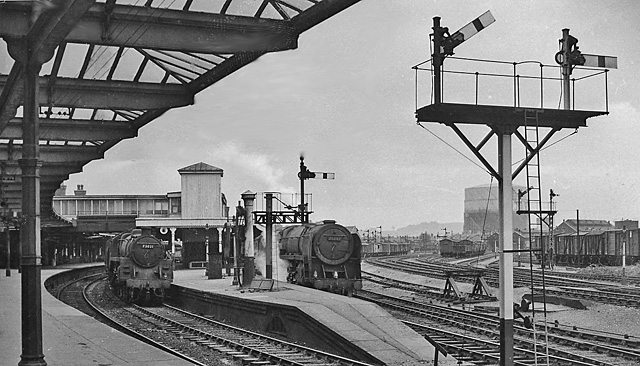
- Gloucester Eastgate in 1963

General information
- Location: Gloucester, Gloucester; England
- Grid reference: SO838183
- Platforms: 4

Other information
- Status: Disused

History
- Original company: Midland Railway
- Pre-grouping: Midland Railway
- Post-grouping: London, Midland and Scottish Railway

Key dates
- 12 April 1896: Opened as Gloucester
- 17 September 1951: Renamed Gloucester Eastgate
- 1 December 1975: Closed
Location

Gloucester Eastgate railway station was a station in Gloucester, England, used by trains from Birmingham to Bristol. Originally the Birmingham and Gloucester Railway (which later became part of the Midland Railway) used a terminus station roughly on the site of the current Gloucester station car park.

== History ==
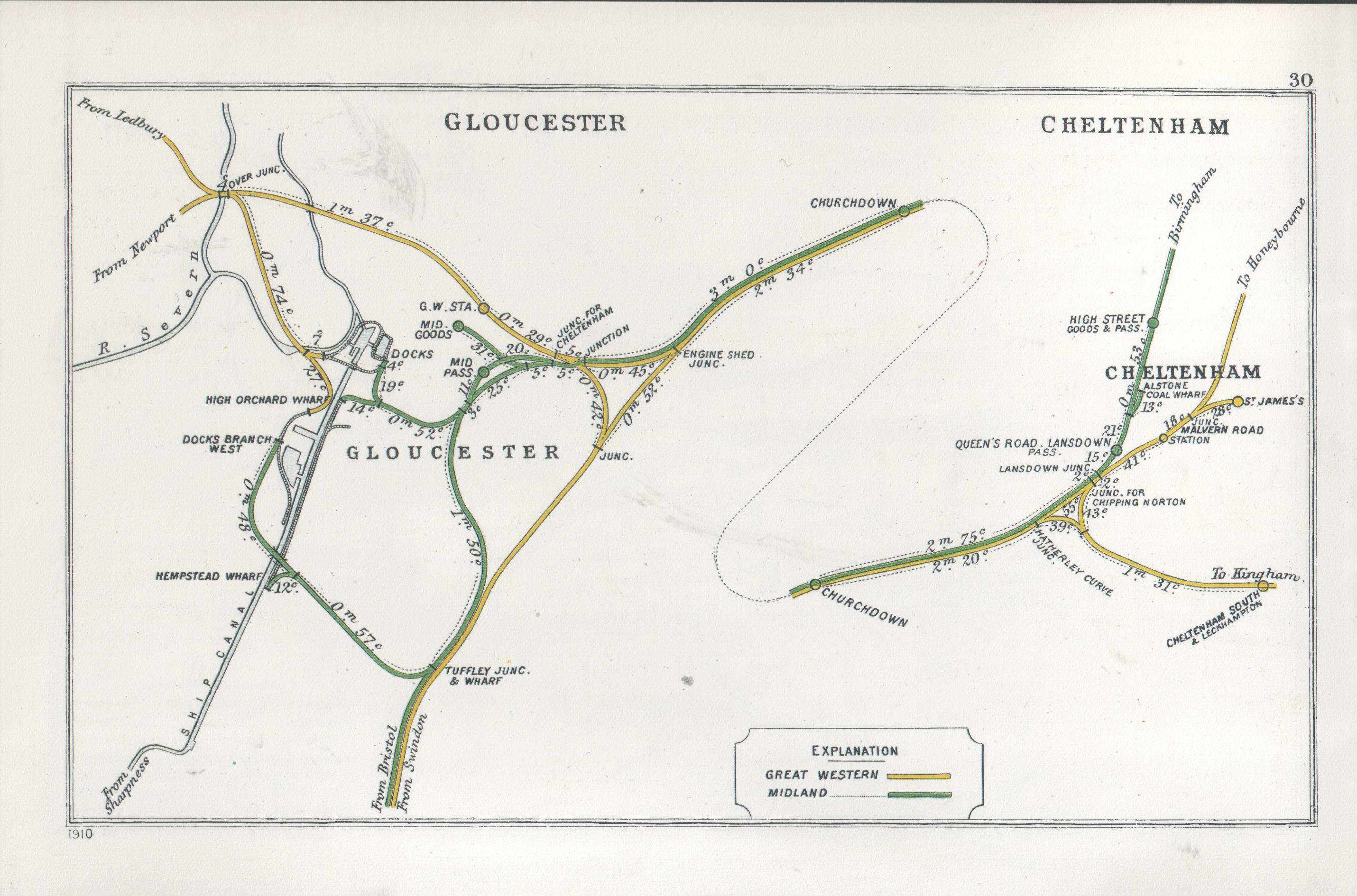
A 1910 Railway Clearing House map of railways in the vicinity of Gloucester Eastgate (shown here as MID PASS)

In 1896 a new through station was constructed on the Tuffley Loop line on a site that had previously housed the Midland Railway engine shed. The station, originally known simply as Gloucester, opened on 12 April 1896; it had three through platforms and one bay. It was sharply curved and featured a main entrance building as well as buildings on both platforms. Buildings were of typical Midland Railway design in red brick with terracotta decoration. Extensive cast-iron and glass ridge-and-furrow awnings covered the platforms. There was a direct footbridge connection to the ex-Great Western Railway Gloucester Central station.

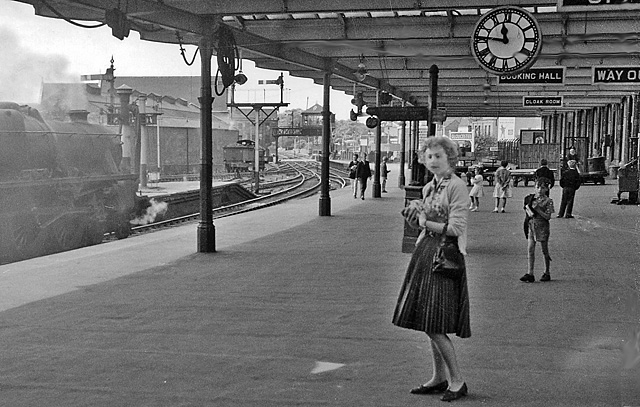
Gloucester Eastgate in July 1961

Following Nationalisation, the station was renamed Gloucester Eastgate on 17 September 1951, to distinguish it from the nearby ex-GWR station, Gloucester Central.

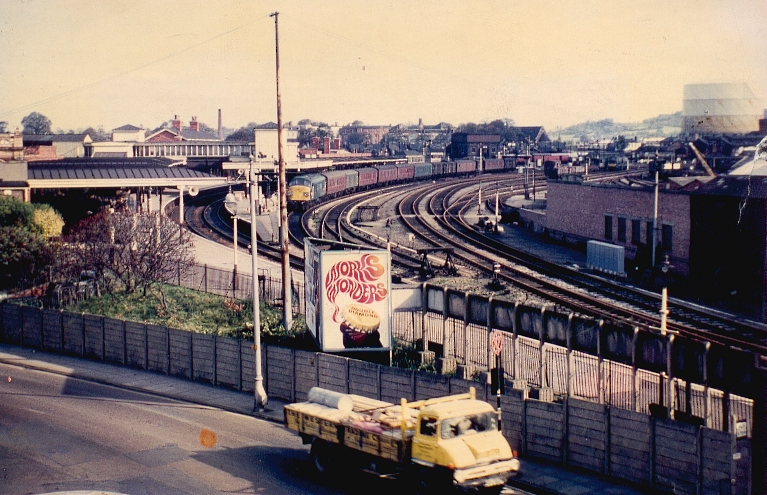
Gloucester Eastgate in circa 1967

After 1968, the station was rationalised. The island platform was lengthened at the southern end and the tracks were removed from the other two platforms. The extensive goods yard and sidings were also lifted at this time. Colour-light track-circuit block signalling was installed, and the station was effectively merged with Gloucester Central.

Eastgate station was closed on 1 December 1975, along with the Tuffley Loop. This was partly an attempt by British Rail to cut maintenance costs and partly a result of pressure from the road lobby and local councillors who wanted to rid Gloucester of four of its level crossings. Services that had previously called at Eastgate now had to perform a reversal at Central station, an operational inconvenience that has led to fewer trains calling at Gloucester. As the rebuilt Gloucester Central station was not completed until 1977, the administrative offices on Eastgate station lingered on in use for nearly two more years until demolition came in 1977. The site is now an Asda supermarket. Only a very few traces of the former Tuffley Loop can now be found.

== Routes ==
Preceding station	Disused railways	Following station
Haresfield; Line open, station closed	Midland Railway; Tuffley Loop	Churchdown; Line open, station closed
