= Bristol and Gloucester Railway =

Early British railway company

The Bristol and Gloucester Railway was a railway company opened in 1844 to run services between Bristol and Gloucester. It was built on the 7 ft (2,134 mm) Brunel gauge, but it was acquired in 1845 by the 4 ft 8 1/2 in (1,435 mm) standard gauge Midland Railway, which also acquired the Birmingham and Gloucester Railway at the same time.

Legal and practical difficulties meant that it was some time before through standard gauge trains could run on the line; that only became possible in 1854 with the conversion of most of the line to mixed gauge and the opening of the Tuffley Loop.

Even then the station at Gloucester was awkwardly sited, until in 1896 a through station was opened; it later became known as Gloucester Eastgate station.

The Tuffley Loop and Eastgate station were closed in 1975. Part of the original line near Bristol was closed in 1970, trains being diverted over the ex-Great Western Railway route through Filton. However, the remainder of the route is in service currently as part of the busy Bristol to Birmingham main line.

== Earliest railways ==
=== Gloucester and Cheltenham Railway ===
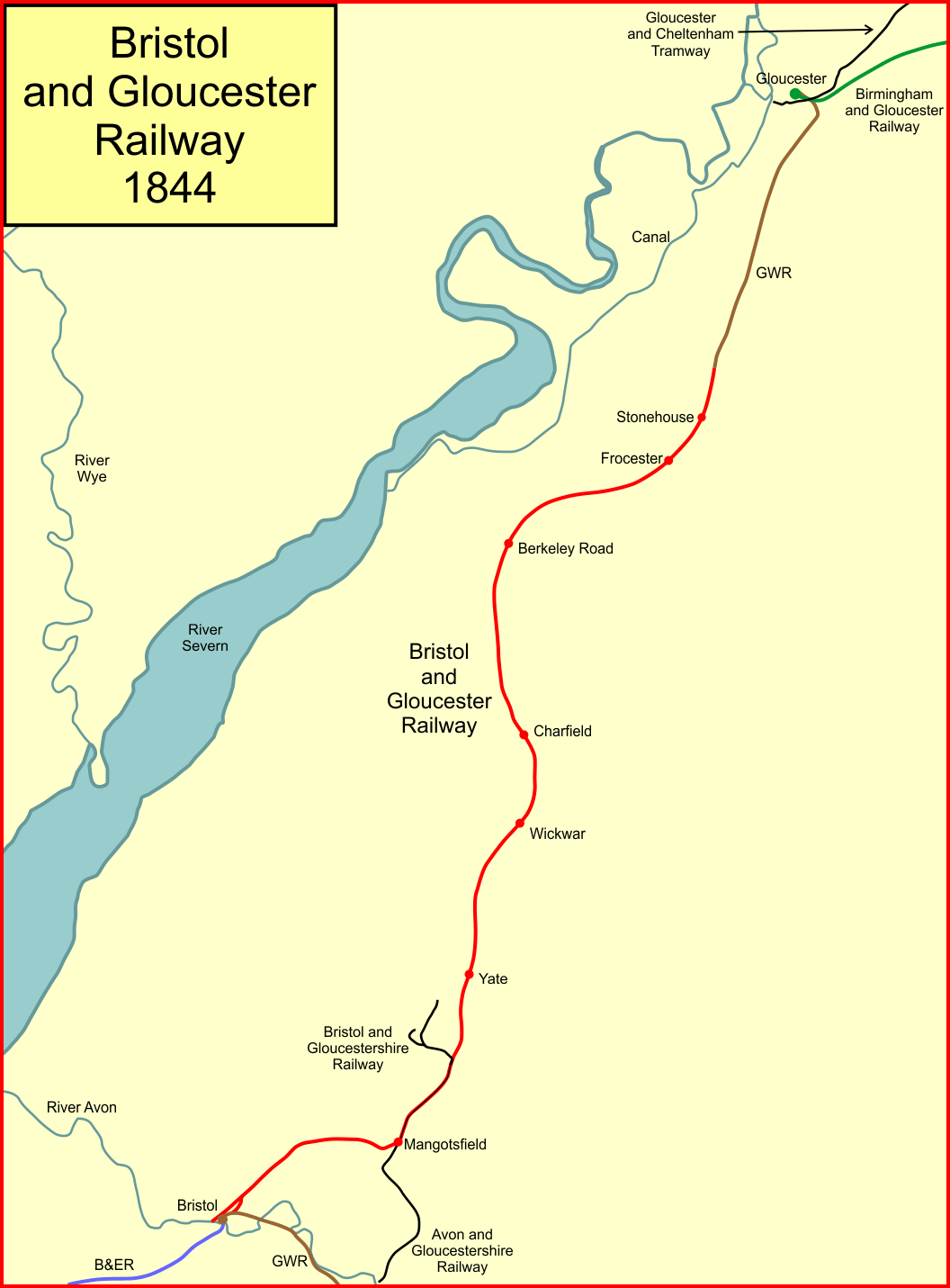
The Bristol and Gloucester Railway in 1844

In 1809 the Gloucester and Cheltenham Railway was authorised by the Gloucester and Cheltenham Railway Act 1809 (49 Geo. 3. c. xxiii). In reality it was to be a horse-operated plateway. Cheltenham was growing in importance because of the supposedly health-giving properties of the waters, and houses for well-to-do residents were being built, requiring the bringing in of stone for the building work and for roads, and coal for the residents. There were good-quality quarries already in existence at Leckhampton, high above the town, and Forest of Dean coal was available at Gloucester, nine miles away, brought there on the River Severn and later by canal. The Gloucester and Cheltenham Railway was built to serve these needs, by connecting the docks at Gloucester (under construction) and the Leckhampton quarries, with Cheltenham. The G&CR was completed in 1811.

Although alternatively referred to as a railway, railroad, or tramway, it was in fact a horse-operated plateway of 3 ft 6 in (1,067 mm) gauge. A steam locomotive was later tried out, but the experiment was a failure because the locomotive was too heavy for the tramplates and broke them.

=== Coal tramroads at Bristol ===
Bristol and Gloucester Railway Act 1828
- Act of Parliament
- Parliament of the United Kingdom
- Long title: An Act for making and maintaining a Railway or Tram Road from or near the City of Bristol to Coalpit Heath in the Parish of Westerleigh in the County of Gloucester.
- Citation: 9 Geo. 4. c. xciii

Dates
- Royal assent: 19 June 1828

Text of statute as originally enacted

In June 1828 two companies were incorporated by act of Parliament to build tramways to bring coal from collieries at Shortwood, Parkfield and Coalpit Heath, to the north-east of Bristol, into Bristol itself. The acts were the Bristol and Gloucester Railway Act 1828 (9 Geo. 4. c. xciii) and the Avon and Gloucestershire Railway Act 1828 (9 Geo. 4. c. xciv), incorporating the Bristol and Gloucestershire Railway, which was to terminate in Bristol at Cuckold's Pill on the Floating Harbour, and the Avon and Gloucestershire Railway, whose terminal was on the River Avon opposite Keynsham, from where river boats would continue the journey. The two lines were to make a junction north of Mangotsfield, near the later Mangotsfield North Junction.

The lines were made with cast iron fish-bellied edge rails on stone blocks, and had a track gauge of 4 ft 8 in (1,422 mm); they were single lines worked by horses. The Avon and Gloucestershire Railway was opened in July 1832 together with the part of the Bristol and Gloucestershire Railway north of the point of junction. The south-western part of the Bristol line was opened on 6 August 1835.

=== Great Western Railway at Bristol ===
In 1835 the Great Western Railway was incorporated, to build a trunk railway from London to Bristol. The engineer was Isambard Kingdom Brunel and the line was to be built on the broad gauge and it would use locomotive power. The line was opened progressively, but the portion in Bristol was opened on 31 August 1840, and the line opened throughout from London to Bristol on 30 June 1841.

=== Birmingham and Gloucester Railway ===
In the 1836 session of Parliament, interests in Birmingham were promoting the Birmingham and Gloucester Railway; if they could reach Gloucester, then waterborne transport from there to Bristol would give a connection between the two great cities, also giving access to the transatlantic shipping trade at Bristol. It obtained its authorising act of Parliament, the Birmingham and Gloucester Railway Act 1836 (6 & 7 Will. 4. c. xiv), on 22 April.

=== Cheltenham and Great Western Union Railway ===
Even before the Great Western Railway had been authorised, people in Cheltenham had determined to promote a line from Cheltenham through Gloucester and Stroud to join the planned Great Western Railway near Swindon; accordingly they submitted a bill for the Cheltenham and Great Western Union Railway in the 1836 session of Parliament. It was passed as the Cheltenham and Great Western Union Railway Act 1836 (6 & 7 Will. 4. c. lxxvii) on 21 June 1836.

=== Between Gloucester and Cheltenham ===
The proposed alignment of these two proposed lines was almost identical between Gloucester and Cheltenham. Moreover, both companies proposed to acquire the Gloucester and Cheltenham Railway; this was not in order to use its main line route, but because of the access it had acquired to Gloucester Docks.

The Gloucester and Cheltenham Railway was purchased for £35,000 by the Birmingham and Gloucester company, which had got its authorising act first, but by agreement the Cheltenham and Great Western Union Railway Act 1836 set up a sharing of the construction of the new main line between Gloucester and Cheltenham, with the B&GR building the Gloucester station and the C&GWUR the Cheltenham station, both companies being able to use both stations, and to share in the use of the tramroad. The Gloucester to Cheltenham main line was to be built in two-halves by the respective companies, each having running powers over the other half. It would be built on the standard gauge, but the C&GWUR could lay additional rails at its own expense to enable its broad gauge trains to operate.

In November 1837 the C&GWUR reported that the condition of the money market was such that they were going to be unable to build all of their line in the foreseeable future, and that they proposed to concentrate on the Swindon end. The Birmingham and Gloucester Railway were alarmed by this as they relied on the C&GWUR to build part of the shared Gloucester to Cheltenham line. The C&GWUR needed an act of Parliament and the Birmingham company secured clauses enabling them to build the relevant portion themselves if the C&GWUR did not proceed with the construction in a timely way. This motivated the C&GWUR to alter its priorities and it let contracts for construction and acquired land at Gloucester for the station. (It had been agreed that the two companies would have separate stations there and at Cheltenham.)

== Bristol and Gloucester Railway formed ==
The development of railways in Great Britain was gaining momentum, and it soon appeared obvious that a line between Bristol and Gloucester was appropriate. An attempt to get authorisation in the 1838 session of Parliament was unsuccessful, but on 1 July 1839 the Bristol and Gloucester Railway was authorised, to take over and extend the old Bristol and Gloucestershire coal line from Westerleigh to a junction with the Cheltenham and Great Western Union Railway at Standish. The length of new line was to be about 22 mi (35 km). Because continuity with the Birmingham and Gloucester Railway was foreseen, the track was to be standard gauge. Authorised capital was £400,000.

The C&GWUR was now (in November 1839) in serious financial difficulty, and it indicated to the Birmingham and Gloucester Railway that it would be unable to build the agreed part of the line at Gloucester. The Birmingham and Gloucester company decided to go ahead and build this itself, but first it approached the newly authorised Bristol and Gloucester Company, and they agreed to merge and to purchase the C&GWUR together. A parliamentary bill was put forward, but negotiations between the two main companies led to disagreement, and the idea was dropped.

The Birmingham and Gloucester Railway went ahead alone with the construction to Gloucester, and it opened there on 4 November 1840.

By the end of 1841 the C&GWUR had done nothing tangible to construct its own line north of Kemble, and under pressure from others who relied on it, it obtained an act of Parliament, the Cheltenham and Great Western Union Railway Act 1842 (5 & 6 Vict. c. xxviii), authorising sale or lease of its undertaking to any of the neighbouring lines, and extension of time for construction and additional capital, requesting the Birmingham and Gloucester Railway to lay broad gauge rails between Gloucester and Cheltenham (at the expense of the C&GWUR), and enabling the Bristol and Gloucester Railway to make the railway between Standish and Gloucester itself, as a standard gauge line, subject to the C&GWUR buying that back later if they wished. Negotiations were quickly opened with the Great Western Railway to acquire the C&GWUR's line, and after some delay, this was agreed in January 1843. The resources of the GWR would obviously enable them to complete the construction expeditiously.

The Bristol and Gloucester now saw that they were to run between the broad gauge GWR at Bristol, and the broad gauge GWR (ex-C&GWUR) at Standish and Gloucester. Isambard Kingdom Brunel had become the company's engineer (on 12 September 1839), and in April 1843, the Bristol and Gloucester decided to make its line on the broad gauge instead. A connection to the GWR station at Bristol would be made, and the GWR would complete the C&GWUR Standish to Gloucester line within a year and give the Bristol and Gloucester running powers to Cheltenham. The Bristol and Gloucester was to be given access to the GWR stations at all these places. The arrangement was to last for 20 years for a rent of £18,500, rising by £1,000 after five years.

Barnes suggests that the decision was coerced. It is true that if the Bristol and Gloucester Railway had built its line on the narrow gauge it would have been isolated, and the GWR could by-pass it by routeing broad gauge traffic through Swindon and the C&GWUR line. Nevertheless, the saving in capital on building the Bristol station and other facilities, as well as the avoidance of living in proximity to a hostile GWR, were powerful in persuading the Bristol company to select this option; and Brunel had explained that transshipment of goods at the break of gauge to the Birmingham and Gloucester Railway would be simple: "a very simple arrangement may effect the transfer of the entire load of goods from the waggon of one Company to that of the other". Passenger transfer would be even simpler: passengers would "merely step from one carriage into the other in the same station and on the same platform".

MacDermot (citing "Gauge Commission evidence") states that "At this stage, the works were already partly made so that Wickwar and Fishponds Tunnels and several underbridges were in place, built for standard gauge double track," and this is repeated by Christiansen. They are saying that the works were made for a double line standard gauge track; and that the Bristol and Gloucester Railway was opened as a broad gauge line. They do not explain how two broad gauge tracks were squeezed through, and this seems to be a mistake. (Note: Maggs says (on page 16 of the Bristol and Gloucester Railway) that "Brunel had calculated that an extra foot width from Bristol to Standish would only cost an extra £6,968, and suggested that if the line was to be made broad gauge at a later date, only the masonry of tunnels, bridges and embankments need now be wider, as the rock sides of the tunnel could be widened and in cuttings the open ditches could be replaced by tile drains giving more space.)

Lewis observes that "Some structures on the B&GR, including the Stroudwater Canal Bridge, were only 26 ft (7.9 m) (rather than the more usual 28–30 ft (8.5–9.1 m) on other broad gauge lines) due to the late decision by the B&GR to conform to the GWR broad gauge."

The assertion is contradicted by the evidence of James Edward M'Connell, locomotive superintendent of the Bristol and Birmingham Railway in evidence to the Gauge Commissioners on 11 August 1845:

"Q: Is the Wickwar tunnel adapted to the broad gauge?

A: It is; it was constructed for the broad gauge.

Q: Then the broad gauge was determined on before that tunnel was constructed?

A: The bridges and tunnels were all made sufficiently large to accommodate the broad gauge, but till that meeting that I allude to [at which the Bristol and Gloucester decided on the broad gauge], it was perfectly understood that it was to be a narrow [i.e. standard] gauge [line], although the bridges and tunnels were made to suit either."

Bristol and Gloucester Railway Act 1842
- Act of Parliament
- Parliament of the United Kingdom
- Long title: An Act for granting further Powers to the Bristol and Gloucester Railway Company.
- Citation: 5 & 6 Vict. c. xlvi

Dates
- Royal assent: 18 June 1842

Text of statute as originally enacted

On 18 June 1842 an act of Parliament, the Bristol and Gloucester Railway Act 1842 (5 & 6 Vict. c. xlvi) was passed authorising an additional £200,000 in capital.

The Avon and Gloucestershire Railway had its standard gauge fish-bellied rail track between Mangotsfield and Coalpit Heath, and this was preserved by the 1839 act. When the Bristol and Gloucester Railway was first constructed, the broad gauge track was laid with the standard track inside it, the first example of mixed gauge track in the country, between Mangotsfield and Westerleigh, a distance of about 2 1/2 miles (4.0 km). (Note: The title of the first mixed gauge is contested by Williams (on page 37): "The Act for the line between Cheltenham and Gloucester called for the rails to be of the same standard gauge as the B&G. The C&GWU was a broad gauge line, so the first ever mixed-gauge section was laid between the two towns," but in fact, this opened much later, on 23 October 1847. MacDermot calls it the first important instance on page 185.)

The main structure other than the tunnels on the B&GR was Beard's Mill Viaduct at Stonehouse. It was a timber viaduct designed by Brunel; there were ten main spans of 50 ft (15 m), with two shorter approach spans partly buried in the embankment. It lasted well, being replaced by a brick and iron structure, opened fully on 30 July 1884.

There was a 30 ft (9.1 m) span bridge over the Stroudwater Canal just north of the Stonehouse Viaduct; it was laminated timber.

Of the 73 bridges on the line, 41 over and 32 under, there were 15 timber bridges. Ten of these were laminated timber beam bridges of 28 ft (8.5 m) span: in the case of the underbridges they had ballasted longitudinal timber track. There were two trussed overbridges, also 28 ft (8.5 m) span; and three laminated beam overbridges of three spans.

== Opening to traffic ==
The relationship with the GWR was not entirely harmonious, and a proposed working agreement was not finalised, the B&GR believing that the price asked by the GWR was excessive. The necessary arrangement was made with Stothert and Slaughter of Bristol to work the line for ten years, and the Bristol and Gloucester Railway opened on 6 July 1844. The opening ceremony involving a journey from Bristol to Gloucester started very late and the engine derailed approaching Gloucester. During the sumptuous banquet that followed, the Chairman of the Birmingham and Gloucester Railway, in a speech, remarked that, "if the right thing had been done originally, there would have been one line throughout between Birmingham and Bristol, and there would have been no differences about broad gauges and narrow gauges". The public opening of the line was on 8 July 1844.

Bristol and Gloucester Railway Act 1843
- Act of Parliament
- Parliament of the United Kingdom
- Long title: An Act for amending the Acts relating to the Bristol and Gloucester Railway, and for making a Branch Railway out of the same.
- Citation: 6 & 7 Vict. c. liv

Dates
- Royal assent: 27 June 1843

The trains used Temple Meads station at Bristol; a half-mile connecting line at Lawrence Hill had been constructed under powers in the Bristol and Gloucester Railway Act 1843 (6 & 7 Vict. c. liv) of 27 June 1843. At Gloucester the Birmingham and Gloucester had established a station when it opened on 4 November 1840; it was located in the angle of what is now Station Road and Bruton Way. The Bristol and Gloucester opened a platform on the north side of that, its route curving in from the south and south-east so that the respective routes crossed on the approach to the stations. There were six passenger trains each way daily; from the beginning double line was not available throughout, but it was provided after a short time. Coal traffic started operating on 9 September 1843.

== Merging with other railways ==
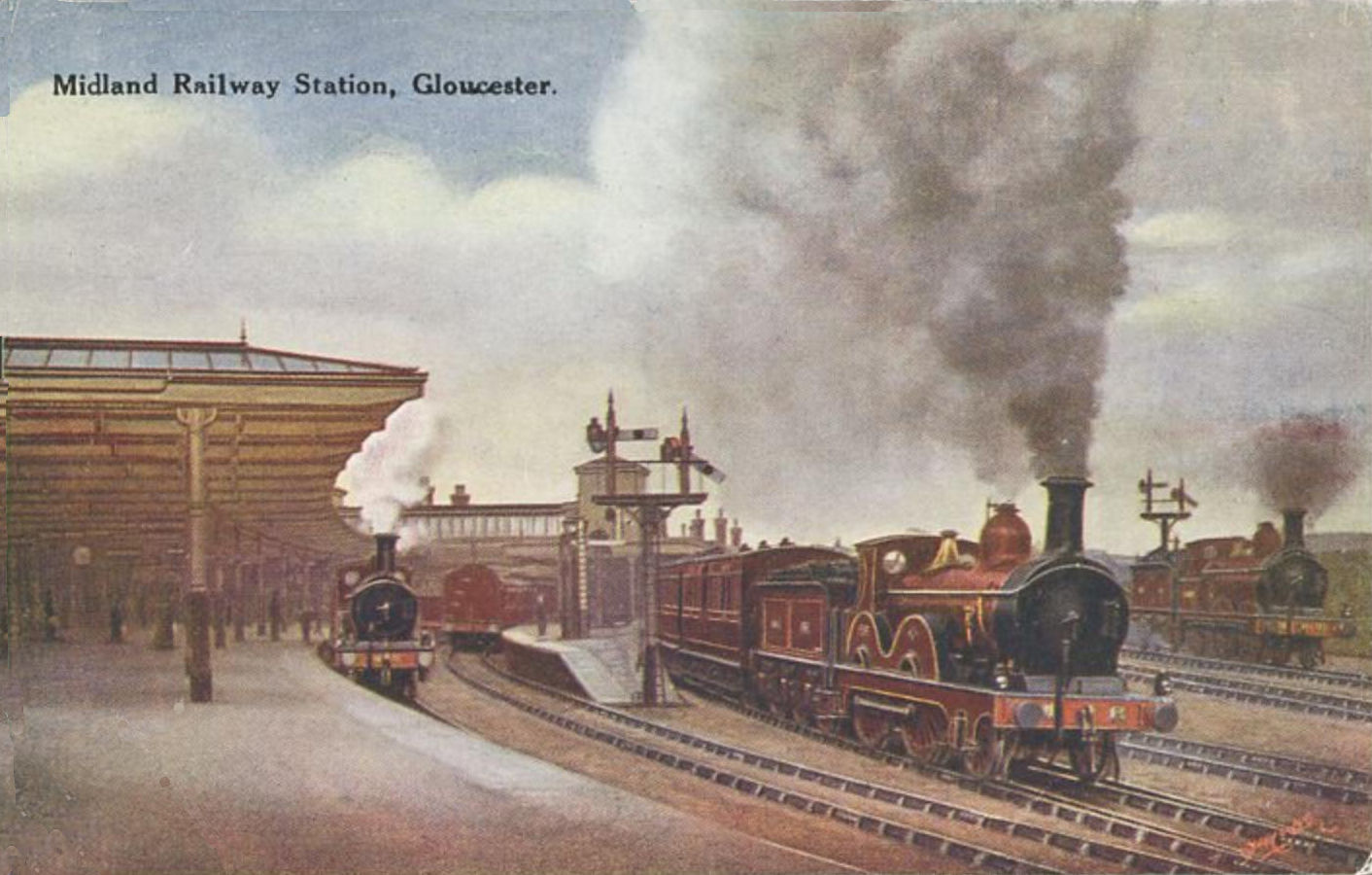
Gloucester Eastgate station

Now that the line was operating, the possibility of merging the Bristol and Gloucester Railway with the Birmingham and Gloucester Railway was raised again at the end of 1844, and this time found favour. The respective chairmen ratified an agreement on 14 January 1845 and the shareholders of the two companies approved it on 28 January. The agreement would have required formalisation by Parliament, but a bill for the purpose failed standing orders. The Great Western Railway immediately moved to propose that the broad gauge should be implemented throughout the new company, that is, into Birmingham, and this developed into a proposal to amalgamate the combined company with the Great Western Railway. The negotiation was simply a matter of cash; on 24 January 1845 a Great Western deputation offered £60 of GWR stock for £100 of Birmingham and Gloucester, at market values equating to about £123 for £109.

The matter was adjourned until a meeting planned for 27 January, but John Ellis, Deputy Chairman of the Midland Railway happened to meet the Birmingham and Gloucester directors. He was aware of the inconvenience of the break of gauge and motivated by fear of that approaching too near to his own business location in Leicester. Ellis soon offered them a perpetual lease at 6% on the £1.8 million capital of the two Gloucester companies, in addition taking on the half-million pound debts. Unable to consult colleagues in the time available, he made this offer entirely on his own responsibility. This was done without hostility to the GWR, he said later, but simply to avoid the extension of the broad gauge. His offer was ratified by the Midland directors on 8 February 1845, and from 1 July the Midland Railway leased the two companies, confirmed by Parliament in the Bristol and Birmingham and Midland Railways Act 1846 (9 & 10 Vict. c. cccxxvi) on 3 August 1846 (as there was not time to prepare the amalgamation bill for the 1845 session. The Bristol and Gloucester Railway and the Birmingham and Gloucester Railway were now part of the Midland Railway.

The Great Western Railway secured a clause in the act of amalgamation requiring the Midland Railway to maintain "two lines of railway of the same gauge as the Great Western Railway" between Bristol and Standish, with running powers over them for the GWR. In 1848 the Midland Railway obtained the Midland Railway Act 1848 (11 & 12 Vict. c. cxxxi) authorising them to add narrow (standard) gauge rails between Bristol and Standish and to lay a separate narrow gauge double track from Standish into Gloucester. This bill, as well as those for the amalgamation, were the responsibility of the Midland Railway's solicitor Samuel Carter.

== Part of the Midland Railway ==
So from February 1845 the Bristol and Gloucester Railway was effectively part of the Midland Railway. The new owner bought out Stothert and Slaughter's working contract and their rolling stock in July 1845, but continued to work the Bristol and Gloucester line on the broad gauge, using the Great Western tracks between Standish and Gloucester station, and the C&GWUR station at Gloucester, although the owning company had not yet reached there.

The Coalpit Heath branch of the old Bristol and Gloucestershire Railway was converted to broad gauge and upgraded for locomotive use; this was ready on 9 June 1847.

== Gloucester lines ==
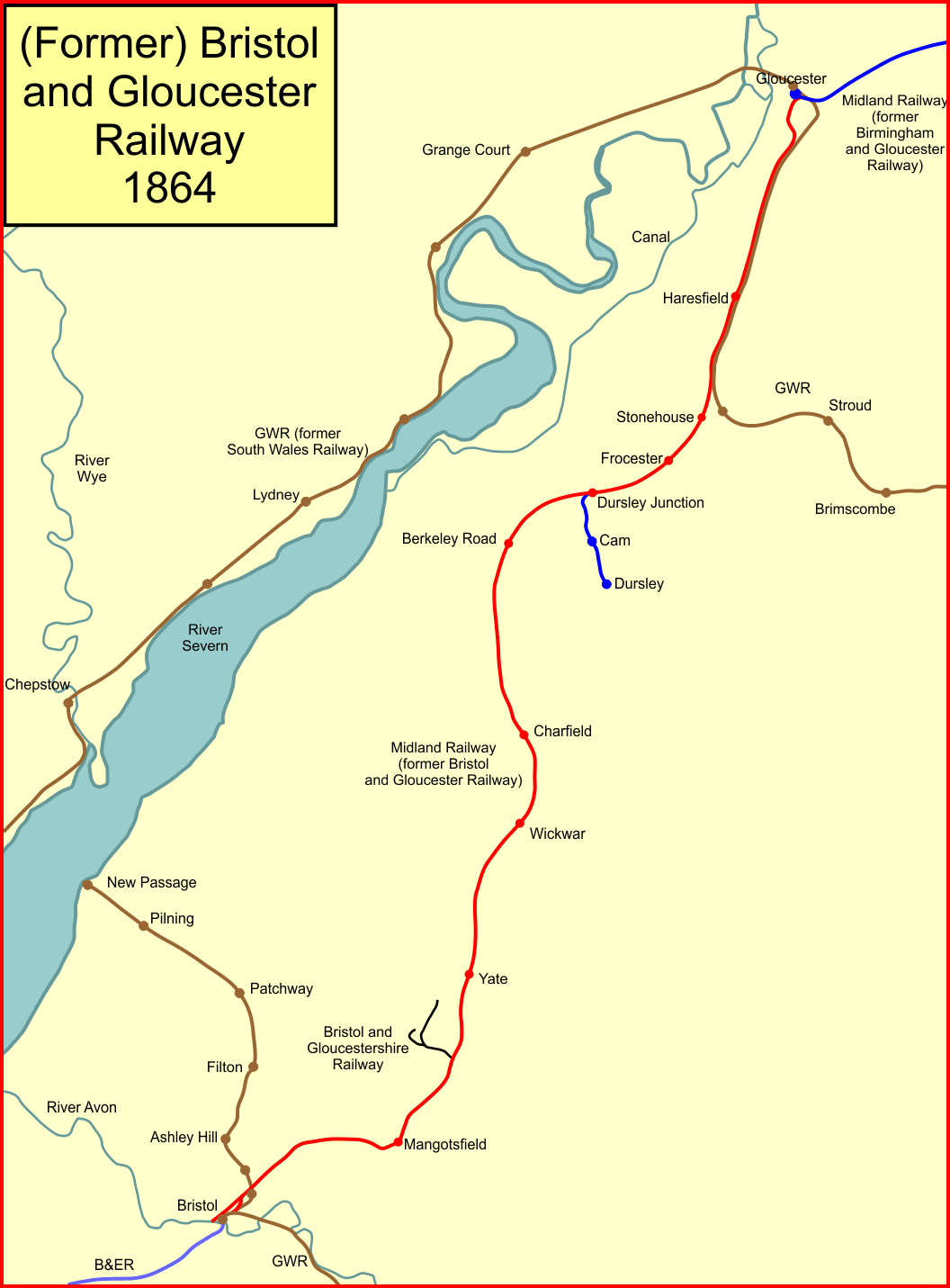
The Bristol and Gloucester lines in 1864

At this time (February 1845), the Gloucester railways consisted of the narrow (standard) gauge former Birmingham and Gloucester line approaching from the north-east, and turning to the west from Barnwood to its terminus station; and the broad gauge former Bristol and Gloucester line approaching from the south-west, and turning to the west to the C&GWUR terminus. In addition the Gloucester and Cheltenham Railway (the horse plateway) was in operation.

The Great Western Railway opened the C&GWUR line on the broad gauge on 12 May 1845, joining the Bristol line at Standish. The fact enabled the GWR to repurchase "its" half of the Cheltenham line that was already opened according to the earlier act of Parliament.

Direct running by-passing Gloucester was desirable, but the Midland Railway had a break of gauge at Gloucester, so it was the GWR which built the third side of the triangle as a broad gauge line. This was ready in 1847 by which time mixed gauge had been installed between Gloucester and Cheltenham. Captain Simmons inspected the new arrangements in October 1847 for the Board of Trade:

Additional rails have now been laid from Cheltenham to Gloucester, uniting the gauges in one line of railway [that is, forming mixed gauge] and a connexion on the broad gauge has been made between the two lines leading into Gloucester Station, called the "Avoiding Line"... the junction of the Avoiding Line with the line from Gloucester station to Cheltenham is called the "Barnwood Junction"; and the point of meeting of the Avoiding Line with the Bristol and London line is called the "Millstream Junction"... [It is not] contemplated to unite carriages of both gauges in one train.

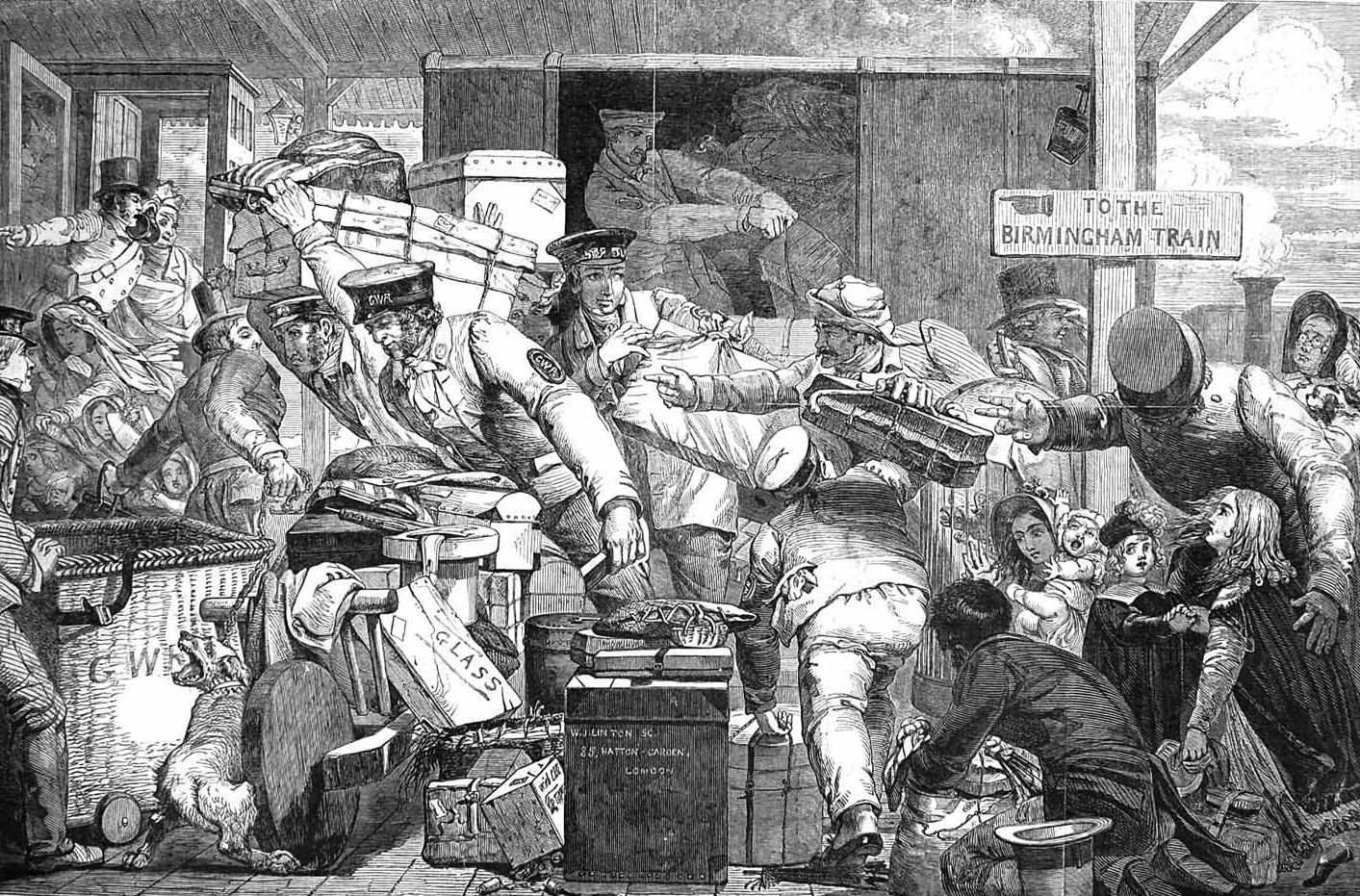
A political cartoon emphasising the evils of the break of gauge at Gloucester

The Midland Railway was now working two separate lines of different gauges, terminating at different (although adjacent) stations in Gloucester. This was hardly a satisfactory long-term situation, and on 14 August 1848 the Midland obtained the Midland Railway Act 1848 (11 & 12 Vict. c. cxxxi), authorising the Gloucester and Stonehouse Junction Railway. This enabled it to lay standard gauge tracks alongside the GWR between Standish Junction (which was near Stonehouse) and Tramway Junction, at the east end of the Gloucester stations, and to lay narrow (standard) gauge rails on the Bristol and Gloucester line between Bristol and Standish. By the Bristol and Birmingham and Midland Railway Act 1846 they were not allowed to remove the broad gauge rails on the Bristol to Standish section. These were never used by the Great Western, and it was not until the GWR converted the gauge of its own lines in the area in 1872 that the Midland was able to discontinue their maintenance. Even then a daily broad gauge coal train of the Bristol and Exeter Railway ran to and from Parkfield colliery, and the broad gauge rails had to be maintained as far as Westerleigh, and on the branch.

The work was brought into use on 22 May 1854. Approaching Gloucester, the new line diverged from the GWR at Tuffley Junction on to the Tuffley Loop, which made a westerly sweep and joined the other lines from west to east at Gloucester, enabling a form of direct running. However it was not possible to run directly to the Midland Railway passenger or goods stations, which were situated as a terminus. Midland Railway trains could at last run through on the narrow gauge from Bristol to Birmingham, but they needed to back in to the station to make the passenger call. There were five new level crossings on the Tuffley Loop, and there were now four tracks, two narrow and two broad gauge, between Standish and Tuffley Junction. The work cost £150,042.

== Docks branches ==
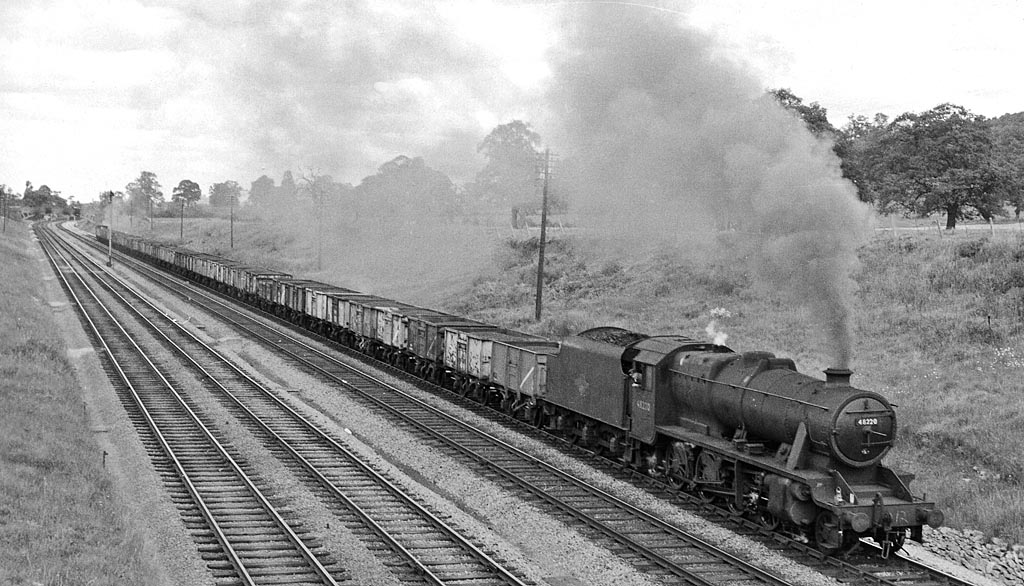
Down coal train south of Haresfield in 1962

The GWR and the Birmingham and Gloucester Railway had jointly acquired the Gloucester and Cheltenham Railway, a horse-operated plateway; the original purpose was to get access to the docks at Gloucester. The tramway was of 3 ft 6 in (1,067 mm) gauge and in street running in Gloucester it made some extremely sharp turns at road junctions. Various proposals were made to convert the plateway to standard gauge in Gloucester, but these were never implemented, and the use by the others railways of the plateway's right of way was confined to sidings within the docks.

A very short stub from the Bristol and Gloucester goods station to a location alongside the plateway was made in 1840; transshipment was necessary there. It closed in 1896.

Independent railway access to the docks was made in 1848 when the High Orchard Branch was opened, from the Tuffley Loop. It closed on 1 October 1971.

In 1900 the New Docks Branch was opened from Tuffley Junction, crossing the Berkeley Canal by a swing bridge to the west side, and joining with the GWR docks branch near Llanthony Bridge. There was a short stub to Hempsted Wharf (on the east side of the canal) and, from 1913, the gas works, which had previously been served exclusively by the canal. These branches all closed by 1971.

== Gauge conversion ==
In 1872 the GWR converted all its broad gauge and mixed gauge track in the Gloucester area to standard gauge. As part of that work it removed the Avoiding Line and the spur to the T station ("long derelict") altogether.

== Further Gloucester improvements ==
The need to reverse in and out of the Gloucester station was a continuing difficulty, and on 12 April 1896 a new through station was opened, on the curve adjacent to the former station; this was a considerable step forward. It was later named Gloucester Eastgate station. The former Bristol and Gloucester and Birmingham and Gloucester stations were limited to goods operation.

The Avoiding Line, now known as the Cheltenham Loop, was reinstated and opened for goods traffic on 25 November 1901; through passenger operation over it followed on 1 July 1908.

== Bristol lines ==
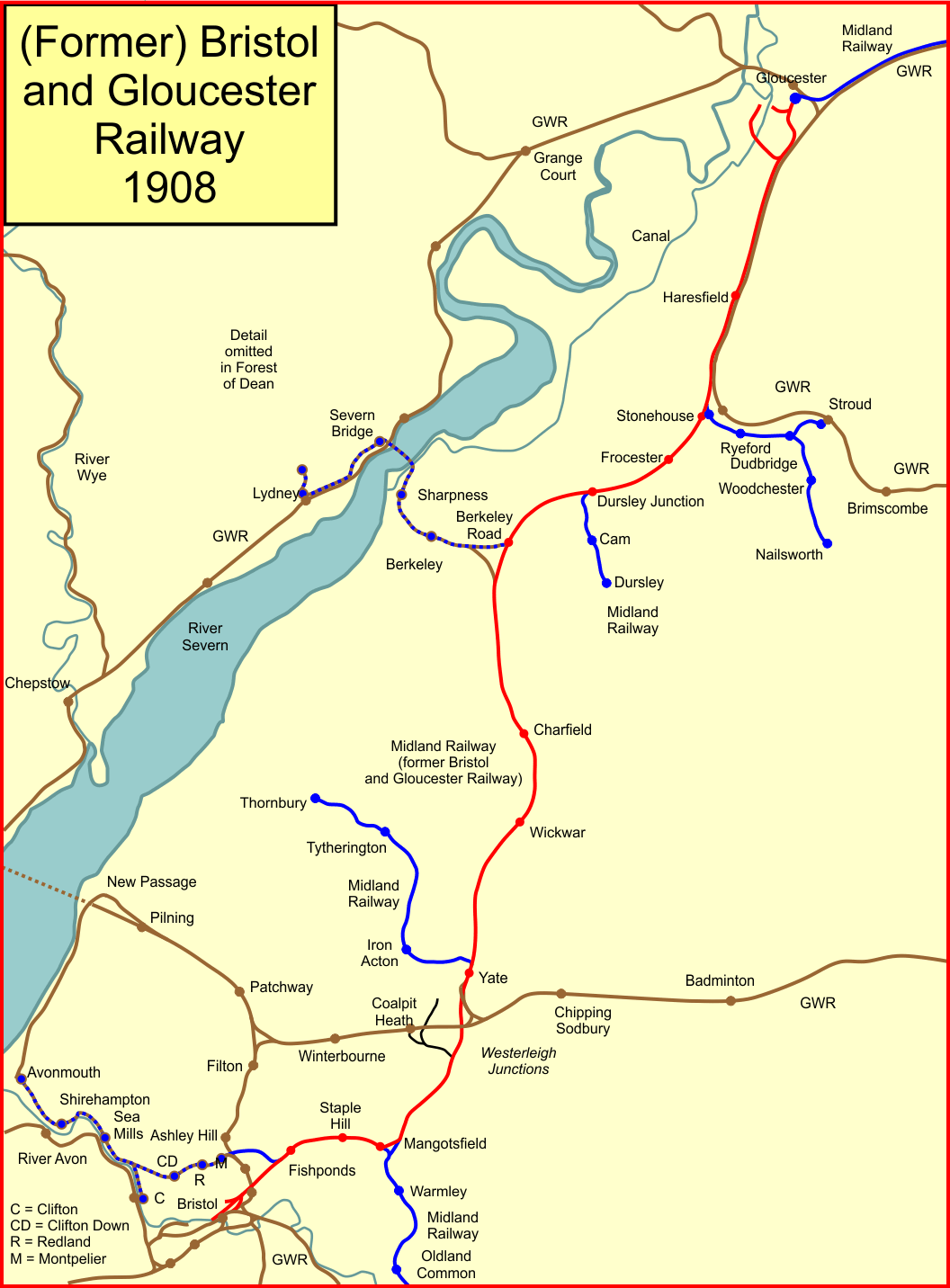
The former Bristol and Gloucester Railway lines in 1903

The Midland Railway passenger trains used the GWR Temple Meads station at Bristol. This was fairly limited in size until enlargement in 1878, and of course handled the traffic of the Bristol and Exeter Railway in addition. Avonside Wharf was used for transfer to and from river barges and lighters. From 1858 the Midland Railway established its own goods facilities at St Philips, and on 2 May 1870 a single platform passenger station was opened there, dealing chiefly with Bath trains. A major engine shed was opened at Barrow Road in 1873 complemented by a carriage shed in 1877.

== Branch lines ==
As a main line trunk railway, the Bristol and Gloucester line had a number of branch lines added over the years; they are described from north to south.

=== Quedgeley ===
In 1915 an ammunition factory was established at Quedgeley, immediately south of Tuffley Junction. It had a rail connection and a considerable network of sidings amounting to about three miles. There was a workers' platform from 13 December 1915 until 1925. The buildings were demolished after 1924 and the branch closed in 1925. In World War II an RAF station, RAF Quedgeley, was established on the site on 15 April 1939; it was a storage and maintenance depot for aircraft equipment and motor vehicles. It continued in this logistics role until its closure in 1995. It had a branch line, open from 9 April 1939 to 1990.

=== Nailsworth and Stroud ===
In 1867 the Stonehouse and Nailsworth Railway was opened. Nailsworth was an important centre of local industry; the line ran from Stonehouse on the Bristol and Gloucester line. The building company was desperately short of money, and their line was purchased by the Midland Railway in 1868. A branch from that line to Stroud was originally authorised, but not built at first; the GWR Swindon line already served Stroud. In 1885 the Midland Railway Stroud branch from the Nailsworth line was opened. Passenger services ceased in 1947 and the goods service was discontinued in 1966.

=== Frampton Mineral Branch ===
A Mineral Railway was established in Frampton in about 1903 and continued until about 1923. Sometimes known as the Ballast Pit Branch, it ran for a couple of miles from the Midland Railway station at Frocester. It crossed through open fields on the edge of Eastington before traversing the A38 Gloucester-Bristol road between Claypits and Cambridge via a level crossing, finally making its way to the extensive gravel pits at Frampton-on-Severn.

At the Frampton end of the rail line, there were a number of short sidings, as well as lines that were sometimes moved closer to the gravel deposit being worked. There was an engine shed for the locomotive, and several storage buildings. The route can be seen on the 25" to the mile maps for the area including Gloucestershire XLIX.5 Gloucestershire XLIX.1 Gloucestershire XLVIII.4 Gloucestershire XL.16 Gloucestershire XL.11 Gloucestershire XL.12 Gloucestershire XL.15

=== Dursley ===
The town of Dursley felt disadvantaged by being left off the railway network, and local interests promoted the Dursley and Midland Junction Railway, to make a short branch from Coaley on the Bristol and Gloucester line. It opened on 18 September 1856; the junction station was named Dursley Junction at first. This line too was in a difficult financial situation, and sold its concern to the Midland Railway in 1860. Passenger services were withdrawn in 1962. An engineering business at Dursley sustained the line for some years, but it closed completely in 1970.

=== Sharpness and Lydney ===
Sharpness was an important centre of local industry, and in addition was a port on the River Severn, and the point at which the Gloucester and Sharpness Canal originated, running towards Gloucester. The Midland Railway built a branch line, which opened on 1 August 1876, from Berkeley Road station on the main line, a distance of four miles.

In 1879 the Severn Bridge Railway opened, joining Lydney to Sharpness and creating a through route across the River Severn. Although the promoters had hoped to create a new trunk route, the limited carrying capacity of the Severn Bridge frustrated plans to run heavy main line trains across it.

The Great Western Railway opened a south curve to the Sharpness branch in 1908, in connection with the Badminton railway line, below.

=== Thornbury branch ===
The Midland Railway opened the Thornbury branch on 2 September 1872, from Yate. There was a short branch off the line to Frampton Cotterell where there were iron ore workings. The Frampton Cotterell section lasted only until 15 April 1878. Thornbury itself warranted a passenger train service, but that was withdrawn on 19 June 1944. Total closure of the branch took place on 24 November 1967.

In 1970 the Tytherington Quarry sought a rail connection, and the line as far as the quarry was reopened; stone trains started running from 3 July 1972.

=== Connections at Yate from the Badminton line ===
At the turn of the century, the Great Western Railway was under pressure to improve its route from South Wales to London. A very heavy flow of coal and other minerals ran on this axis, but although the Severn Tunnel had been opened, shortening the route, it still ran through Filton and Bath. The line through Bath was exceptionally congested. The GWR decided to build a cut-off line between Patchway, on the approach to the Severn Tunnel and Wootton Bassett (Note: Wootton Bassett was retitled Royal Wootton Bassett in 2009.) which shortened the route and relieved the section at Bath. There was a curve to Filton giving direct access to Bristol. The line was officially referred to as the South Wales and Bristol Direct Railway.

The new line intersected the Bristol and Gloucester line at Westerleigh, and curves from the west and the east on the Badminton line were formed, joining the Bristol and Gloucester line at Yate by a grade-separated junction. In its authorising act of Parliament the GWR obtained running powers to Sharpness, and a south curve was made at Berkeley Road (above) to give direct access. The GWR already had historic running powers from Bristol to Standish Junction. The GWR attempted to use the running powers to operate from Bristol through Filton and Westerleigh to join the Midland at Yate and continue to Standish, but the Midland challenged this on the basis that the new running powers were for traffic to Sharpness only, and the earlier running powers required them to run via Fishponds on the Midland Railway. For the time being the GWR was obliged to use the Fishponds line, attracting a greater toll charge for the running to the Midland. Many years later the GWR was able to use the loop for Gloucester trains, and they were extended to reach Birmingham through Stratford-upon-Avon. The east curve at Westerleigh, and the link into Sharpness, were little used.

=== Branch line to Bath ===
Bath was an important destination, and the Midland Railway built a branch line to it from the Bristol and Gloucester line. It opened on 4 August 1869 from a triangular junction at Mangotsfield; a new junction station was opened at Mangotsfield on the same day. There had been an earlier Mangotsfield station, located at the North Junction, but the new station was greatly enlarged. When the Somerset and Dorset Railway opened its line to Bath on 20 July 1874, the Midland Railway's Bath branch was on a through route from the South Coast at Bournemouth, and traffic volumes expanded considerably. There was an extremely heavy traffic at summer weekends over the S&D Line, using the Midland branch to Bath.

=== Avonmouth ===
On 1 October 1874 the Clifton Extension Railway opened, connecting the Bristol Port Railway and Pier back into Bristol itself, with a GWR connection to Narroways Hill Junction. The long tunnel under Clifton Down had been a formidable challenge. At the same time the Midland Railway made a connection from Kingswood Junction on the Bristol – Mangotsfield line, to Ashley Hill Junction, joining the GWR line from Narroways Hill Junction there. The Clifton Extension Railway itself was joint between the Midland and Great Western Railways from 1890.

== From 1923 ==
After World War I the Government passed the Railways Act 1921 which compulsorily restructured the main line railways of Great Britain into one or other of four new large companies, the "groups". The process was referred to as "the grouping" and is considered to be effective from 1 January 1923. The Midland Railway was a constituent of the new London, Midland and Scottish Railway (LMS), and the Great Western Railway, with others, was a constituent of the new enlarged Great Western Railway. Consequently, the LMS was now the controlling company for the former Bristol and Gloucester line, but the process imposed little other change on practices locally.

== From 1948 ==
On 1 January 1948 the main line railways of Great Britain were taken into national ownership, under British Railways. At first the former companies were replicated, and the London Midland Region of British Railways operated the Bristol and Gloucester line, while the Western Region operated the former Great Western Railway lines in the area.

In 1949 the last of the collieries on the old Bristol and Gloucestershire Railway branch to Coalpit Heath closed down and the branch too was closed.

Since the Great Western Railway had enlarged Temple Meads station at Bristol, the necessity to use St Philip's station had gone, and it was closed on 21 September 1953.

The Avonmouth connection between Kingswood Junction and Ashley Hill Junction closed in 1965.

Following the publication of the Beeching Report (the Reshaping of British Railways) widespread closures of unremunerative stations and lines took place in the latter years of the 1960s. Intermediate stations between Bristol and Gloucester were closed on 4 January 1965.

On 7 March 1966 the former Midland Railway Bath branch and the Somerset and Dorset line were closed, although the Bath branch remained in use until 31 May 1971 for coal traffic to Bath Gas Works.

The quadruple track between Standish Junction and Tuffley Junction was reduced to double track on 8 September 1968.

The existence of two adjacent stations at Gloucester was not in keeping with expectations in the 1970s, and a rationalisation scheme was developed. This resulted in closure of Gloucester Eastgate station on 1 December 1975, as well as the entire Tuffley Loop, and the concentration of all passenger traffic on the GWR station, Gloucester Central. The Central station was itself rationalised to a single long platform. The route layout at Gloucester was therefore a simple triangle, with the south-western apex leading to Standish, the western apex towards Chepstow, and the north-eastern towards Cheltenham. All through passenger trains from Bristol to Cheltenham and beyond needed to reverse in the Gloucester station if they were making a call there.

At Bristol, the section of line between Lawrence Hill Junction (just north of Temple Meads)) and Yate was closed on 29 December 1969. Trains on the Bristol to Gloucester axis ran instead via Filton, Stoke Gifford and Westerleigh Junction, rejoining the Bristol and Gloucester line at Yate. Westerleigh sidings were retained as an engineers' depot and private siding. When Bristol Parkway station opened at Stoke Gifford on 1 May 1972 passenger trains on the Bristol to Gloucester route made calls there, giving the possibility of making connections with South Wales main line services.

Yate station was reopened on 11 May 1989, and Cam & Dursley station was opened on 29 May 1994.

== The present day ==
The majority of the Bristol and Gloucester Railway is in heavy use at present (2017) between Yate and Horton Road in Gloucester. The dominant traffic is long-distance passenger trains, with an additional volume of local traffic and some heavy haul freight.

== Topography ==
- Gloucester (C&GWUR station); opened 8 July 1844; transferred to former Birmingham and Gloucester station when Bristol and Gloucester Railway became mixed gauge;
- Gloucester Eastgate; opened 12 April 1896; renamed Gloucester Eastgate 1951; closed 1 December 1975;
- Tuffley Junction; convergence of Tuffley Loop and C&GWUR direct line;
- Haresfield; opened 29 May 1854; closed 4 January 1965;
- Standish Junction; divergence of Swindon line (former C&GWUR);
- Stonehouse Bristol Road; opened 8 July 1844; renamed Stonehouse Bristol Road 1951; closed 4 January 1965;
- Frocester; opened 8 July 1844; closed 11 December 1961;
- Cam and Dursley; opened 29 May 1994; still open;
- Dursley Junction; opened 17 September 1856; renamed Coaley 1888; closed 4 January 1965;
- Berkeley Road; opened 8 July 1844; closed 4 January 1965;
- Berkeley Road South Junction;
- Charfield; opened 8 July 1844; closed 4 January 1965;
- Wickwar; opened 8 July 1844; closed 4 January 1965;
- Yate; opened 8 July 1844; closed 4 January 1965; reopened 15 May 1989, still open;
- Westerleigh Yard;
- Mangotsfield North Junction; divergence to Bath Green Park;
- Mangotsfield; open by May 1845; relocated southwards 4 August 1869; convergence from Bath Green Park; closed 7 March 1966;
- Staple Hill; opened 1 November 1888; closed 7 March 1966;
- Fishponds; opened by October 1849; closed after September 1850; reopened 21 March 1866 as Stapleton; renamed Fish Ponds 1867; renamed Fishponds 1910; closed 7 March 1966;
- St Philips; opened 2 May 1870; closed 21 September 1953;
- Bristol Temple Meads; GWR station.

== Locomotives ==
The broad gauge locomotives that operated this line carried up to four different numbers during the ten years or so that they were running. The first number (in the series 1 – 11) was given by Stothert and Slaughter who were contracted to operate the railway.

Although the Midland Railway (MR) purchased these eleven locomotives from the contractors in July 1845, and absorbed the Bristol & Gloucester Railway (and the Birmingham & Gloucester Railway) on 3 August 1846, the locomotives were not given MR numbers until February 1847, when they became nos. 260–270. They were twice renumbered by adding 100 to their number in June 1852 and again in September 1853. Eight of the locomotives (B&GR nos. 1, 3 & 7 excepted) were sold by the MR to Thomas Brassey, who had secured the contract for working the North Devon Railway from 28 July 1855.

=== Bristol and Gloucester 2-4-0 ===
Tugwell
Type and origin
- Power type: Steam
Specifications
- Configuration
  - Whyte: 2-4-0
- Gauge: 7 ft 1/4 in (2,140 mm)
- Driver dia.: 5 ft 0 in (1.524 m)
- Loco weight: 17 long tons 10 cwt (39,200 lb or 17.8 t)
- Cylinder size: 15 in × 18 in (381 mm × 457 mm) bore × stroke
Career
- Number in class: 3
- Numbers: 1–3

These were intended for goods traffic. The locomotives were built at Stothert and Slaughter's workshops in Bristol using parts supplied by Bury, Curtis, and Kennedy.

- 1 Tugwell (1844–1856)

Midland Railway 268 (later 368 and then 468); it was broken up in 1856.

- 2 Industry (1844–1856)

Midland Railway 269 (later 369 then 469). It was sold for £1000 to Thomas Brassey in May 1856 to work on the North Devon Railway, where it was named Venus, being withdrawn in August 1870.

- 3 Pilot (1844–1851)

Midland Railway 270. It was broken up by September 1851.

=== Bristol and Gloucester 2-2-2 ===
Bristol
Type and origin
- Power type: Steam
- Builder: Stothert & Slaughter
Specifications
- Configuration
  - Whyte: 2-2-2
- Gauge: 7 ft 1/4 in (2,140 mm)
- Leading dia.: 3 ft 6 in (1.067 m)
- Driver dia.: 6 ft 6 in (1.981 m)
- Trailing dia.: 3 ft 6 in (1.067 m)
- Wheelbase: 13 ft 11 in (4.24 m)
- Loco weight: 18 long tons 0 cwt (40,300 lb or 18.3 t)
- Cylinder size: 15 in × 21 in (381 mm × 533 mm) dia × stroke
Career
- Number in class: 6
- Numbers: 4–9

These locomotives were built at Stothert and Slaughter's workshops in Bristol using parts supplied by Bury, Curtis, and Kennedy.

- 4 Bristol (1844–1855)

Named after Bristol, the southern terminus of the line, it was sold to Thomas Brassey in 1855 to work on the North Devon Railway. It ran as Midland Railway 260 (later 360 and then 460).

- 5 Gloucester (1844–1855)

Named after the northern terminus of the line, it was sold to Thomas Brassey in 1855. It ran as Midland Railway 261 (later 361 and then 461).

- 6 Berkeley (1844–1856)

Named after the town of Berkeley near Charfield, it was sold to Thomas Brassey in 1856. It ran as Midland Railway 262 (later 362 and then 462).

- 7 Wickwar (1844–1853)

Named after the town of Wickwar, where the railway passed through a tunnel. It ran as Midland Railway 263 (later 363) but was withdrawn in 1853 following a boiler explosion at Bristol.

- 8 Cheltenham (1844–1856)

Named after the town of Cheltenham which was actually on the Birmingham and Gloucester Railway, it was sold to Thomas Brassey in 1856. It ran as Midland Railway 264 (later 364 and then 464).

- 9 Stroud (1844–1855)

Named after the town of Stroud near Stonehouse (but actually on the Cheltenham and Great Western Union Railway), it was sold to Thomas Brassey in 1855. It ran as Midland Railway 265 (later 365 and then 465).

=== Bristol and Gloucester 0-6-0 ===
Dreadnought
Type and origin
- Power type: Steam
Specifications
- Configuration
  - Whyte: 0-6-0
- Gauge: 7 ft 1/4 in (2,140 mm)
- Driver dia.: 5 ft 0 in (1.524 m)
- Loco weight: 26 long tons 0 cwt (58,200 lb or 26.4 t)
- Cylinder size: 16 in × 21 in (406 mm × 533 mm), dia × stroke
Career
- Number in class: 2
- Numbers: 10–11

These were supplied by the Vulcan Foundry.

- 10 Dreadnought (1856–1863)

It was sold to Thomas Brassey in 1855. It ran as Midland Railway 267 (later 367, then 567).

- 11 Defiance (1857–1867)

It was sold to Thomas Brassey in 1857 to work on the North Devon Railway. It ran as Midland Railway 266 (later 366 then 466).

=== Midland Railway 2-2-2 ===
- 66 (1848–1854)
- 67 (1849–1854)
- 68 (1849–1854)
- 69 (1849–1854)

These locomotives were renumbered into the 200, 300, then the 400 series before being converted to 4 ft 8 1/2 in (1,435 mm) standard gauge in 1854.

=== Midland Railway 0-6-0 ===
- 290 (1852–1854)
- 291 (1852–1854)

These locomotives were renumbered into the 300, then the 400 series before being converted to 4 ft 8 1/2 in (1,435 mm) standard gauge in 1854.
