= Gloucester railway station =

Railway station in Gloucestershire, England

Gloucester
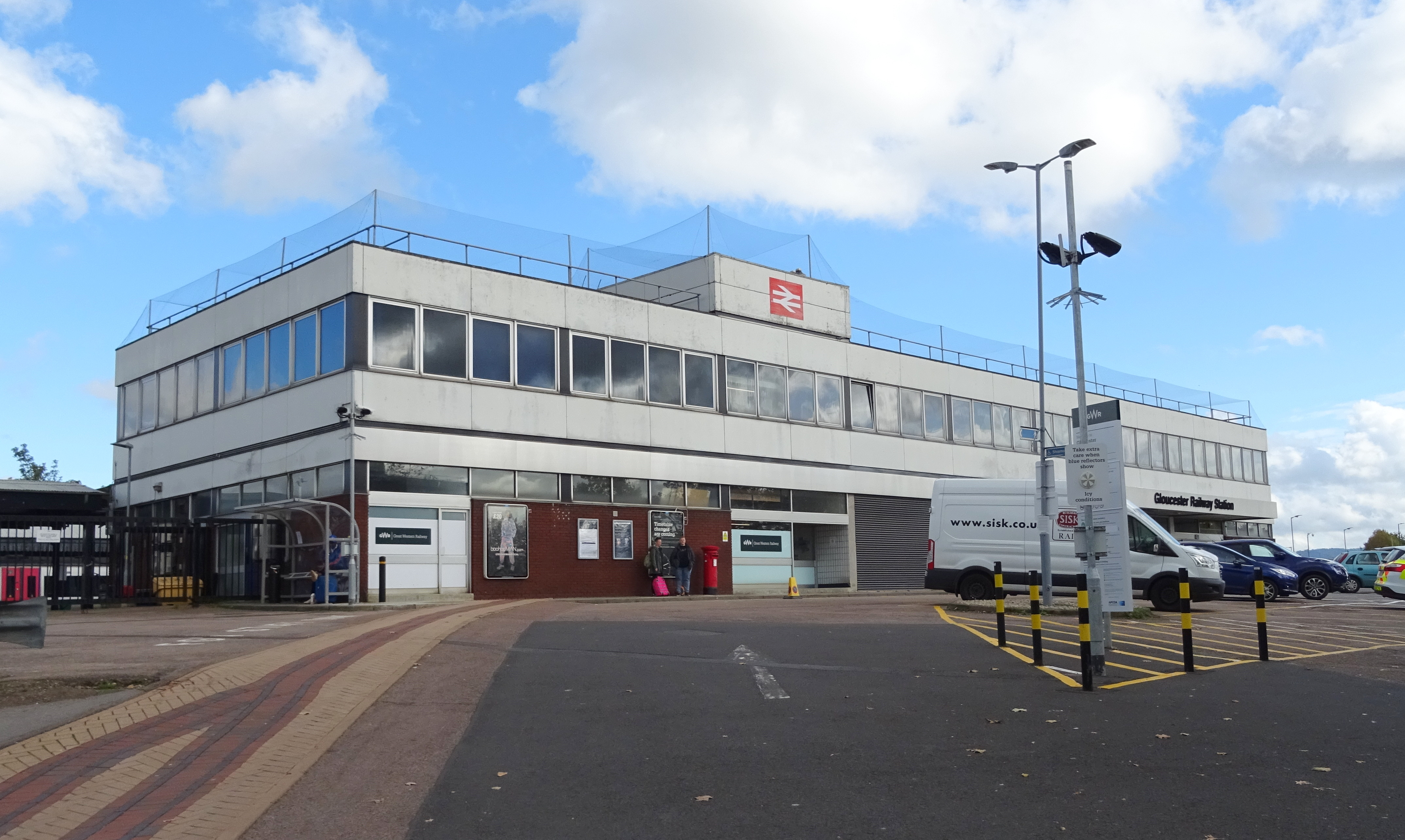
- Gloucester railway station in October 2019

General information
- Location: Gloucester, City of Gloucester; England
- Coordinates: 51.865°N 2.239°W
- Grid reference: SO836185
- Managed by: Great Western Railway
- Platforms: 4

Other information
- Station code: GCR
- Classification: DfT category C1

Key dates
- 4 November 1840: Birmingham line opened
- 8 July 1844: C&GWUR opened
- 19 September 1851: G&DFR opened
- 1 December 1975: Former MR Eastgate station closed

Passengers
- 2020/21: ▼0.395 million
- Interchange: 9,535
- 2021/22: ▲1.214 million
- Interchange: ▲34,343
- 2022/23: ▲1.453 million
- Interchange: ▲63,110
- 2023/24: ▲1.577 million
- Interchange: ▲0.123 million
- 2024/25: ▲1.764 million
- Interchange: ▲0.154 million
Location
Notes
- Passenger statistics from the Office of Rail and Road

Gloucester, formerly known as Gloucester Central, is a railway station serving the city of Gloucester in England. It is located 114 miles 4 chains (183.5 km) west of London Paddington, via Stroud.

The station was originally built as the terminus of the Birmingham and Gloucester Railway in 1840; the arrival of the broad-gauge Bristol and Gloucester Railway and Cheltenham and Great Western Union Railway in 1844, and then conversion to a through station for the South Wales Railway in 1851, resulted in a very complex layout. Subsequent closures and rationalisation have left Gloucester with a station that is located off the main Bristol-Birmingham line; this means that Great Western Railway services must reverse, while CrossCountry and Transport for Wales services continue to Newport.

== History ==
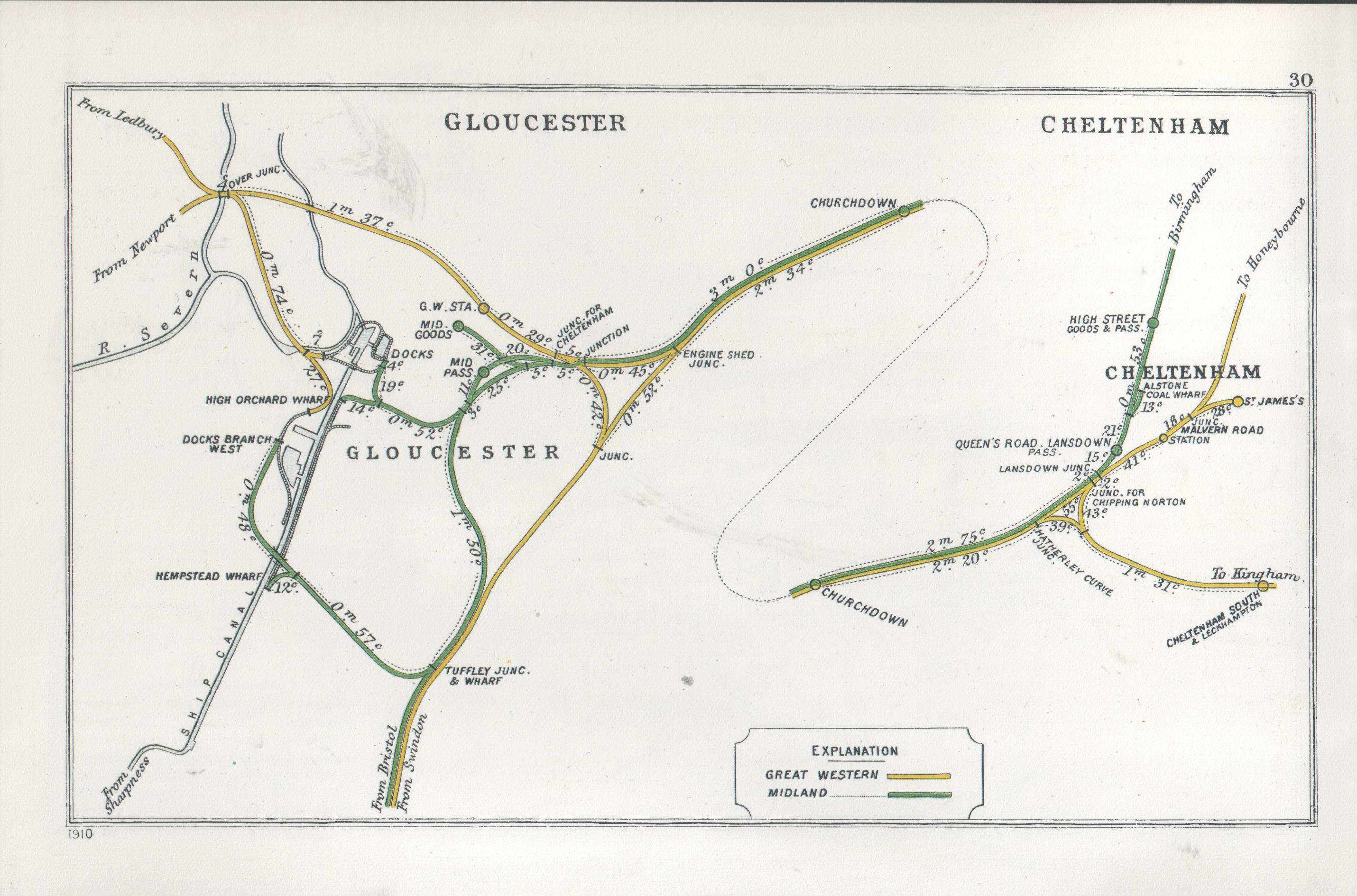
A 1910 Railway Clearing House map of railways in the vicinity of Gloucester (shown here as G.W. STA)

The railway development at Gloucester was very complex involving four different railway companies and five distinct railway stations. The first company to open was the Birmingham and Gloucester Railway, which was a standard-gauge line opened on 4 November 1840. This line from Cheltenham was built by the Birmingham and Gloucester railway on a formation built by the Cheltenham and Great Western Union Railway (see below). The first station was a terminus built on land near the cattle market. This was seen as a temporary structure to be replaced by a more permanent structure nearer the docks when more finance was available, but this never happened and this structure determined the site of the station today.

The Cheltenham and Great Western Union Railway (C&GWU) opened a 7 ft (2,134 mm) broad-gauge line from Swindon to Gloucester on 8 July 1844, and built their station adjacent and to the north of the Birmingham and Gloucester station. The line from Gloucester to Cheltenham was upgraded to mixed gauge so that the C&GWU could share tracks to Cheltenham, which meant trains had to reverse at Gloucester.

At the same time as the C&GWU opened, the Bristol and Gloucester Railway also opened a broad-gauge line from Bristol to Standish Junction a few miles south of Gloucester, and shared the tracks of the C&GWU into Gloucester station. In 1845, the Midland Railway, which had already bought the Birmingham and Gloucester Railway, also absorbed the Bristol and Gloucester Railway. Similarly, the Great Western Railway had taken over the C&GWU, which resulted in a jointly owned (MR & GWR), mixed-gauge station from which trains ran on shared mixed-gauge track both northwards and southwards from Gloucester.

In 1847, the GWR opened the Cheltenham Loop line which completed the triangle junction east of the station. This allowed GWR trains to avoid the reversal at Gloucester, but so as to allow GWR passengers to access Gloucester, a link line was built to a station on the loop called the Gloucester T station. Carriages were detached from trains at the T station, turned on turntables and taken into the main Gloucester station. This operation was not very successful and so was abandoned, along with the loop line, in 1851. Hereafter, GWR trains from London to Cheltenham continued to reverse at the main station, a practice that continues to this day.

On 19 September 1851, the Gloucester and Dean Forest Railway and the South Wales Railway opened a line southwestwards from Gloucester towards the Forest of Dean, Chepstow and South Wales. A new, 2-platform through-station was built immediately north of the existing station, although this was rebuilt in 1855 with a longer, single platform after it was found that the original station was too small.

On 22 May 1854, the Midland Railway opened a new, standard-gauge railway between Gloucester and Standish Junction, thus avoiding running on the ex-CGWU line into Gloucester. This new line parallelled the old route as far as Tuffley, where the Tuffley Loop swung into Gloucester and looped back onto the main Bristol-to-Birmingham line. The MR also rebuilt the old 1840 station, lengthening platforms and adding new buildings, but because this was still a terminus and the Tuffley Loop headed eastwards, trains still had to reverse in and out of the station. This anomaly was not sorted out for another 40 years until the MR opened a new station on 12 April 1896, south-east of the existing station, on the Tuffley Loop. The old station was demolished, to be replaced by sidings, and the new MR station was linked to the GWR station by a 250-yards-long, covered footbridge.

In 1901, the Cheltenham Loop, now known as 'the Gloucester avoiding line', was re-instated, primarily for goods traffic, but also for passengers from 1908. Between 1914 and 1920, the GWR station was expanded with a second long platform north of the running lines, two centre tracks for through movements and bay platforms. The two main platforms were also split in two with a scissors crossing in the middle. On 17 September 1951, the Western station was renamed Gloucester Central and the Midland station renamed Gloucester Eastgate to avoid confusion.

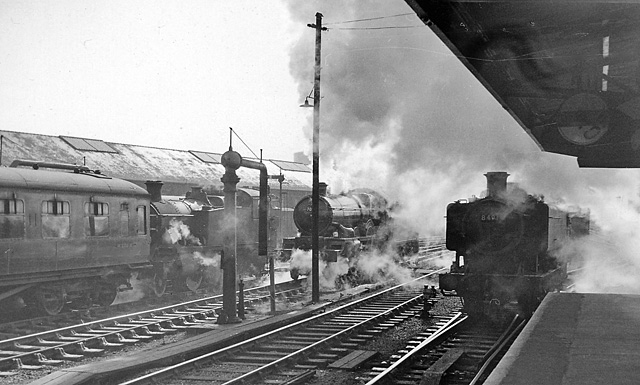
The station in April 1962

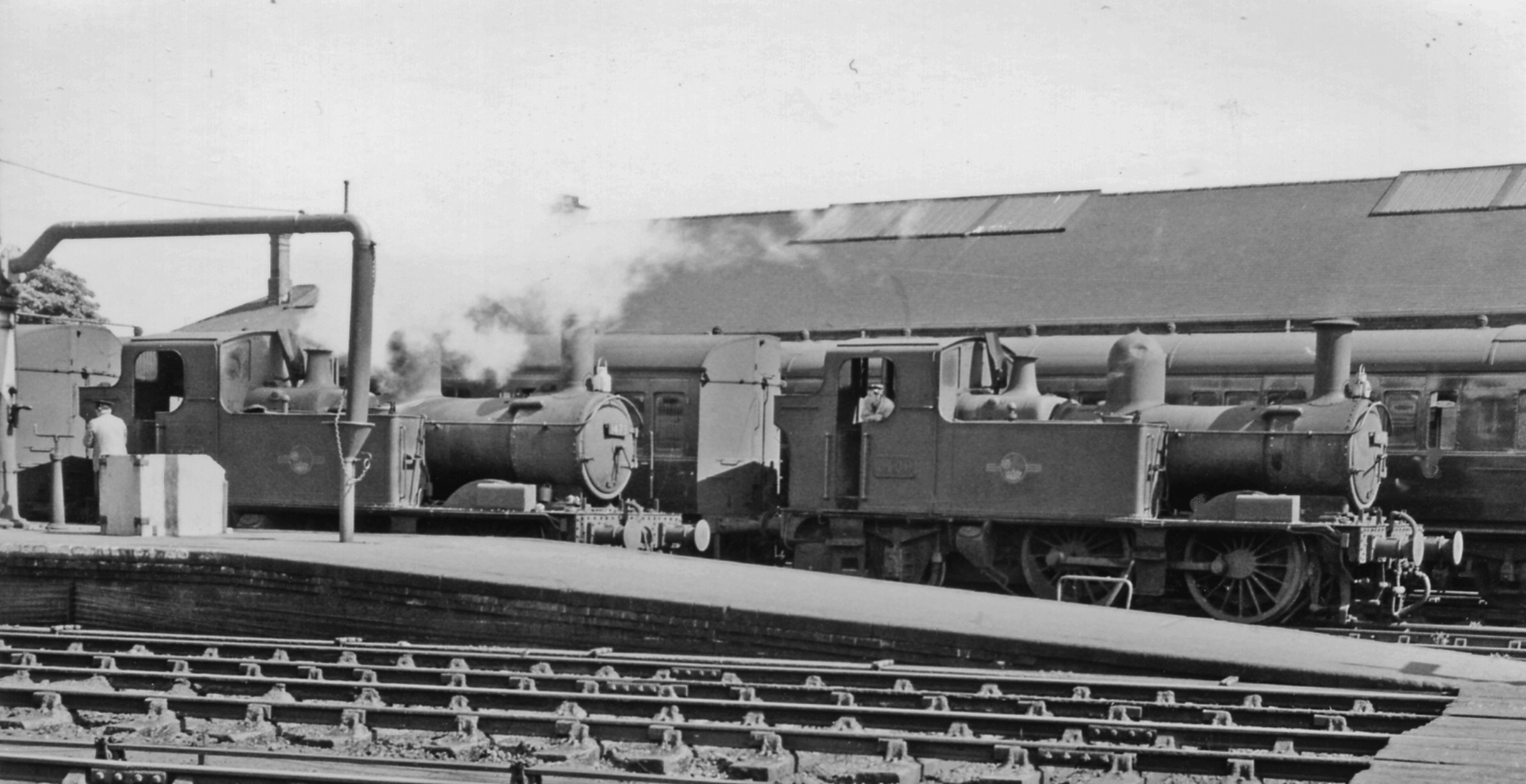
Two 0-4-2Ts employed on the auto-train service to Chalford in June 1962

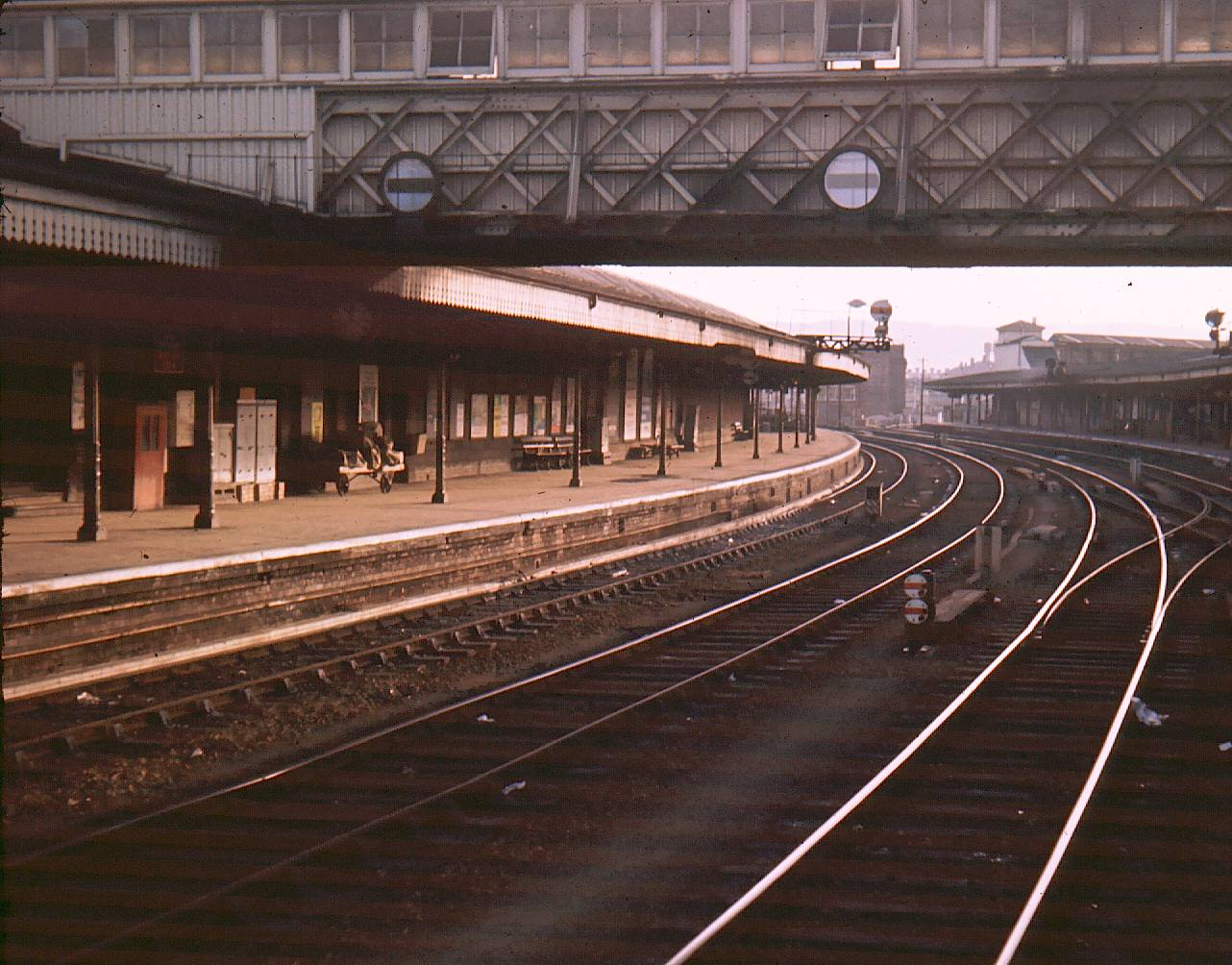
View towards Birmingham in 1968

By the mid-1960s, plans were floated to rationalise the stations – the 1914 upside platform at Gloucester Central was reduced to a parcels-only platform and Gloucester Eastgate was reduced to two platforms. There was also a proposal for an entirely new station on the triangular junction east of the existing stations, to avoid the troublesome reversals, but this was not taken further. Even then, although the through-platforms of Gloucester Eastgate on the Bristol–Birmingham (former Midland Railway) line avoided the still-current problems with trains having to reverse direction, it was seen as a hindrance because the Tuffley Loop line had five level crossings, which caused a lot of traffic problems in town. Therefore, on 1 December 1975, Gloucester Eastgate and the Tuffley Loop line were closed and all operations were concentrated at Gloucester Central. This station was redeveloped and re-opened in 1977 with new station buildings and an extended platform, which, at 1977 ft, was long enough to take two of the Inter-City 125 trains then being introduced to the Western Region. In 1984, the 1914 parcels platform was brought back into use as a passenger platform and a new footbridge was opened to provide access.

On New Year's Eve 2010, a fire broke out in the booking office due to arson and the ground floor was severely damaged. The booking office was closed for over a year while the station was refurbished and a temporary ticket office was erected to the right of the entrance. In May 2013, the new booking office was reopened by Richard Graham, MP for Gloucester, and new lifts were installed. Further redevelopment is being planned after complaints that the station does not give a good impression for visitors to the city.

In September 2015, Gloucester Railway Station was the first to sign up to a football style card system for dealing with constant trouble makers.

=== Midland Stationmasters ===
- Y.E. Fry ca. 1859 - 1874
- Edward L Needham 1874 - 1876
- John H. Stalvies 1877 - 1891
- William Orton 1891 - 1901 (formerly station master at Redditch)
- Richard William Mapp 1902 - 1903 (formerly station master at Belper, afterwards station master at Leicester)
- John Henry Garton 1903 - 1908 (formerly station master at Kettering)
- H.L. Bailey 1908 - 1925 (formerly station master at Bath)
- William Hardy 1925 - 1927 (formerly station master at Willenhall, afterwards station master at Lincoln)
- James Davies 1927 - 1928 (formerly station master at Bath)
- Douglas Harold Day 1928 - 1931 (afterwards station master at Stoke on Trent)
- Walter James Burfitt 1931 - 1938
- Harry James King 1938 - 1946 (formerly station master at Evesham)
- Alfred John Pickthorne 1946 - 1950

== Description ==
At 1,977 feet 4 inches (602.69 m), Gloucester has the second-longest platform in the UK — the longest is Colchester's platform at 2034 ft (620 m), albeit Gloucester has the longest unbroken platform, as Colchester's is two different physical platforms. The platform was lengthened as part of the 1977 rebuilding by British Rail and was intended to handle two InterCity 125 trains at the same time. These trains were put into service on the Western Region London Paddington to Cheltenham Spa services at this time and all services were handled by the same platform.

The ticket office just inside the station entrance is open for most of the day, seven days a week. There is a Costa Coffee outlet on the main concourse of the station.

== Redevelopment ==
In 2018, the government approved a £3.75 million redesign of the station with the backing of GFirst and Gloucester City Council but the funds were unavailable until April 2020. In February 2019, the council began a £425,000 redesign of the station. The project includes new cladding, an upgraded underpass, an expanded car park accessible by a new road junction, and a redesigned forecourt with a taxi rank and bus stop. The redevelopment came to completion in February 2025 at a total cost of £6 million.

== Services ==
The station is served by several train operating companies:

- Transport for Wales operates an hourly local service (with an hourly gap every three hours during off-peak periods) between Cardiff Central, Chepstow and Cheltenham Spa.
- CrossCountry operates an hourly Cardiff Central - Nottingham service, via Birmingham New Street.
- Great Western Railway operates an hourly service to London Paddington, via the Golden Valley line; on Sundays, there is an hourly service to Swindon, with three services a day continuing on to Paddington. GWR also operate an hourly service to Westbury and a half-hourly service to Bristol Temple Meads, with hourly extensions to Cheltenham, Worcester and Great Malvern; this includes two daily services to and from Weymouth. There is a limited service to Chippenham and Melksham, as well as one through service per day to Southampton Central.

When engineering work occurs in the Severn Tunnel, trains run by Great Western Railway along the South Wales Main Line can be diverted at short notice via Gloucester, with trains running from Swansea to Swindon and London Paddington.

Preceding station	National Rail	Following station
Lydney	Transport for Wales; Gloucester–Newport line	Terminus or Cheltenham Spa
Newport	CrossCountry Cardiff – Nottingham	Cheltenham Spa
Chepstow	CrossCountry Cardiff – Nottingham	Cheltenham Spa
Lydney	CrossCountry Cardiff – Nottingham	Cheltenham Spa
Cheltenham Spa	Great Western Railway; London – Swindon – Cheltenham	Stonehouse
Cheltenham Spa	Great Western Railway; Cheltenham – Swindon – Westbury	Stonehouse
Yate or Cam and Dursley	Great Western Railway; Great Malvern – Gloucester – Westbury	Terminus or Cheltenham Spa
	Historical railways	
Terminus	Birmingham and Gloucester Railway	Churchdown; Line open, station closed
Terminus	Midland Railway; Birmingham – Gloucester	Churchdown; Line open, station closed
Haresfield; Line open, station closed	Midland Railway; Bristol and Gloucester Railway	Terminus
Cheltenham (Malvern Road); Line and station closed	Great Western Railway; Cheltenham and Great Western Union Railway	Stonehouse (Burdett Road); Line and station open
Terminus	Great Western Railway; Ledbury and Gloucester Railway	Barbers Bridge; Line and station closed
