= Alkerton =

Alkerton may refer to:

- Alkerton, Gloucestershire
- Alkerton, Oxfordshire
