= Eastington, Stroud =

Village in Gloucestershire, England

Coordinates: 51.746°N 2.326°W

Eastington
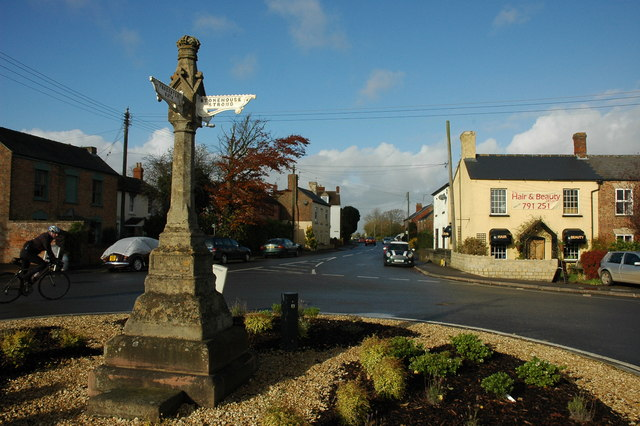
- Finger post, Eastington

- Location within Gloucestershire
- Population: 2,439 (2021 Census)
- OS grid reference: SO774053
- Civil parish: Eastington
- District: Stroud
- Shire county: Gloucestershire
- Region: South West
- Country: England
- Sovereign state: United Kingdom
- Post town: STONEHOUSE
- Postcode district: GL10
- Dialling code: 01453
- Police: Gloucestershire
- Fire: Gloucestershire
- Ambulance: South Western
- UK Parliament: Stroud

Eastington is a village and civil parish in Gloucestershire, England, which lies 4 miles west of Stroud and 9 miles south of Gloucester at the entrance to the Stroud Valley. It is west of the town of Stonehouse and south of Junction 13 of the M5 motorway and the A38 and A419 roads. Since the M5 and its access roads were opened, the main road no longer runs through the village.

Eastington parish includes farms and former mills, which were powered by the River Frome and Oldbury Brook. The settlements include Alkerton, Churchend, Nastend and Claypits.

The village contains retail outlets including a Co-op incorporating a post office, a butchers, two pubs, one hairdresser, and a garage. At nearby Claypits there is a farm shop and a coach company. There is a community centre with sports field, and a village hall. The local primary school provides for about 140 pupils, and is next to the Church of England St Michael and All Angel's at Churchend. There is also the independent evangelical Church of Christ the King.

The nature reserve of Five Acre Grove lies east of the parish in Leonard Stanley, and is designated a Key Wildlife Site (KWS).

For local government elections, the parish is part of the Severn ward.
