= Whitstone Hundred =

Historical division of Gloucestershire, England

Coordinates: 51.7°N 2.23°W

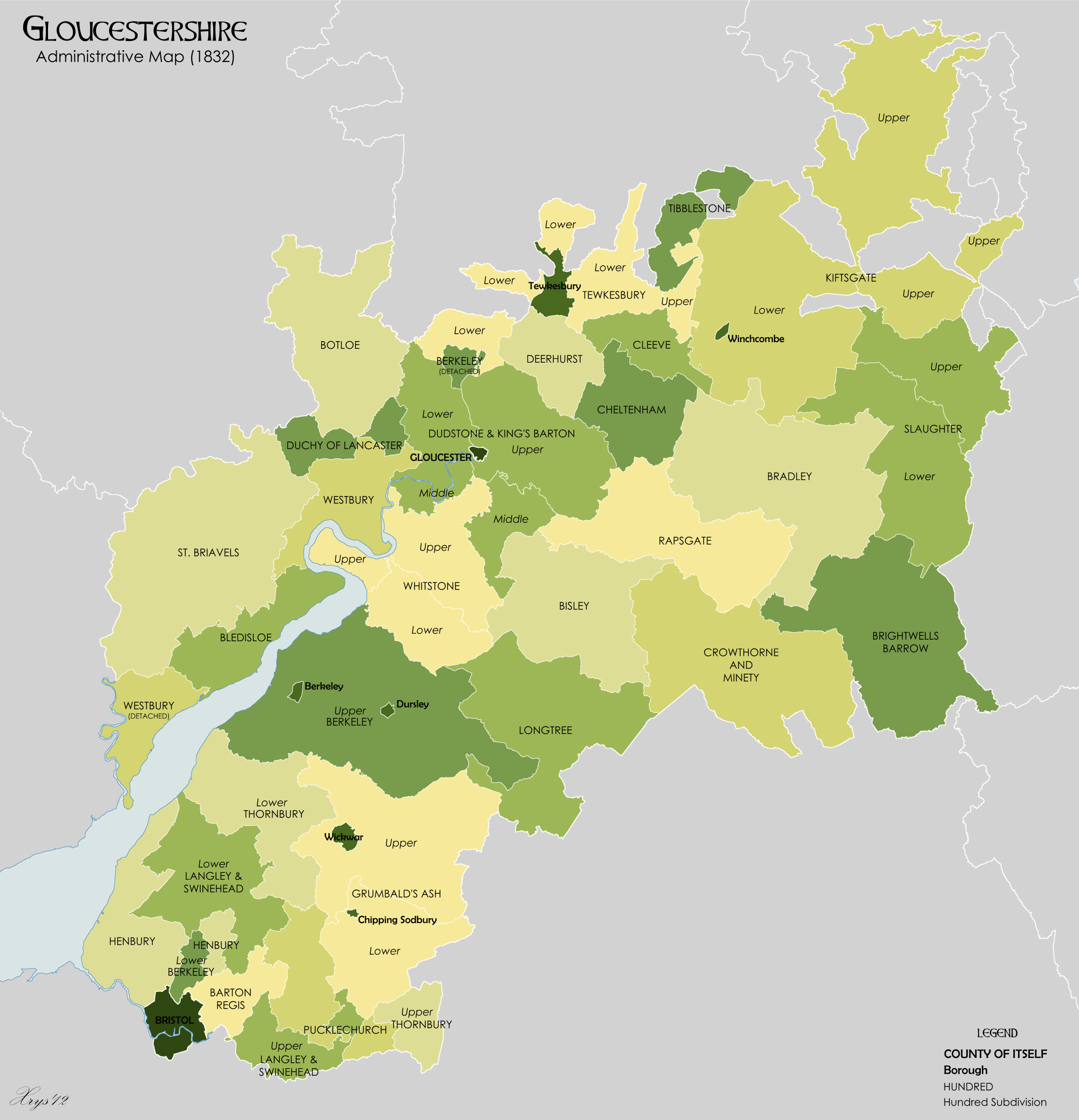
Gloucestershire Hundreds in 1832

Whitstone was an ancient hundred of Gloucestershire, England. From the 13th century it comprised two adjacent divisions, which included the ancient parishes of:

Lower Division

- Eastington
- Frampton-on-Severn
- Frocester
- King's Stanley
- Leonard Stanley
- Stonehouse
- Wheatenhurst (now Whitminster)

Upper Division

- Fretherne
- Hardwicke
- Haresfield
- Longney
- Moreton Valence
- Randwick
- Saul
- Standish
- Quedgeley (part)

The hundred existed at the time of the Domesday Book in 1086, although it covered a smaller area. By 1220 the adjacent Blacklow Hundred had been absorbed. Blachelaue in the Domesday Book contained the parishes of Alkerton (now Eastington), Frampton (-on-Severn), Frocester, (Kings) Stanley, (Leonard) Stanley, Stonehouse, Wheatenhurst, and Fretherne.

The ancient meeting place of the hundred was probably at Whitestones Field in the parish of Hardwicke, although meetings were later held at Quedgeley, Stonehouse, Wheatenhurst and Frampton.
