= Five Acre Grove =

Nature reserve in Gloucestershire, England

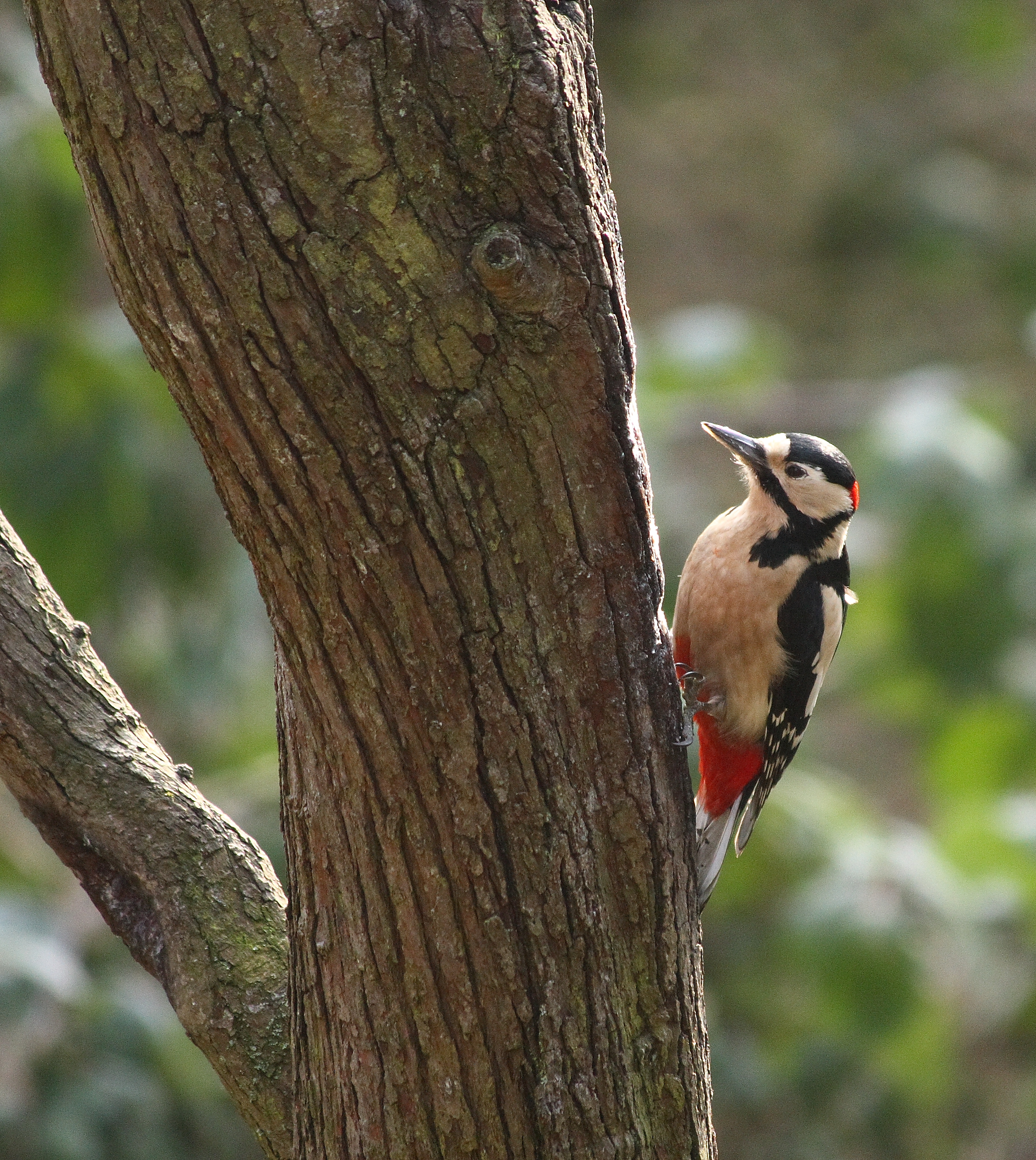
- Example - Male great spotted woodpecker (Dendrocopos major)

- Location within Gloucestershire
- Location: between Eastington and Leonard Stanley
- Coordinates: 51°44′14.87″N 2°18′12.03″W
- Area: 12.3 acres (5.0 ha)
- Created: 1966
- Status: Open all year

Five Acre Grove (grid reference SO791043) is a 5-hectare (12-acre) nature reserve in Leonard Stanley, Gloucestershire. The site is listed in the 'Cotswold District' Local Plan 2001-2011 as a Key Wildlife Site (KWS).

== Location and habitat ==
The grove is one of a diminished number of ancient woodlands in the Severn Vale. It is between Eastington and Leonard Stanley. The railway line which runs between Bristol and Gloucester passes through it. The reserve is three distinct areas. The wood is shown as a larger area in Sir Isaac Taylor's 1777 map of the county. Railway construction cut off five acres to the east in the 1840s. This does not give the reserve its name as Five Acre is a corruption of Fyfacres, which was its name in 1530. Its local name is Bluebell Wood.

The wood grows on heavy Lower Lias clay. The grove is described as ancient oak and ash woodland and it known for its spring flowers, bird life and bird song.

== Flora ==
The tree canopy is dominated by pedunculate oak and ash some of which are estimated to be 200 years old. This canopy opened up after the loss of English elm to disease, and then beech after the 1976 drought. There are old ash coppice and hazel coppice. wild service-trees are in evidence. Mixed varieties make up the shrub layer and include field maple, spindle, hawthorn and holly. The west wood contains crab apple trees.

As its local name implies, the grove supports a good display of bluebells in the spring. Other flowers present are those expected in such woodland being wood anemone, early purple orchid, ramsons and dog-violet. Herb-paris is also recorded.

== Bird life ==
The bird life has been recorded for the Common Bird Consensus. Breeding birds include great spotted woodpecker, marsh tit, blackcap, jackdaw, bullfinch, wren, mistle thrush and also goldcrest and spotted flycatcher. Notable visiting winter flocks include redwing and fieldfare. Woodcock and brambling are recorded. Owls use the area for hunting.

== Audio ==
Great Spotted Woodpecker drum. (Dendrocopos major)
