= Leonard Stanley Priory =

Church in Leonard Stanley, Gloucestershire, England

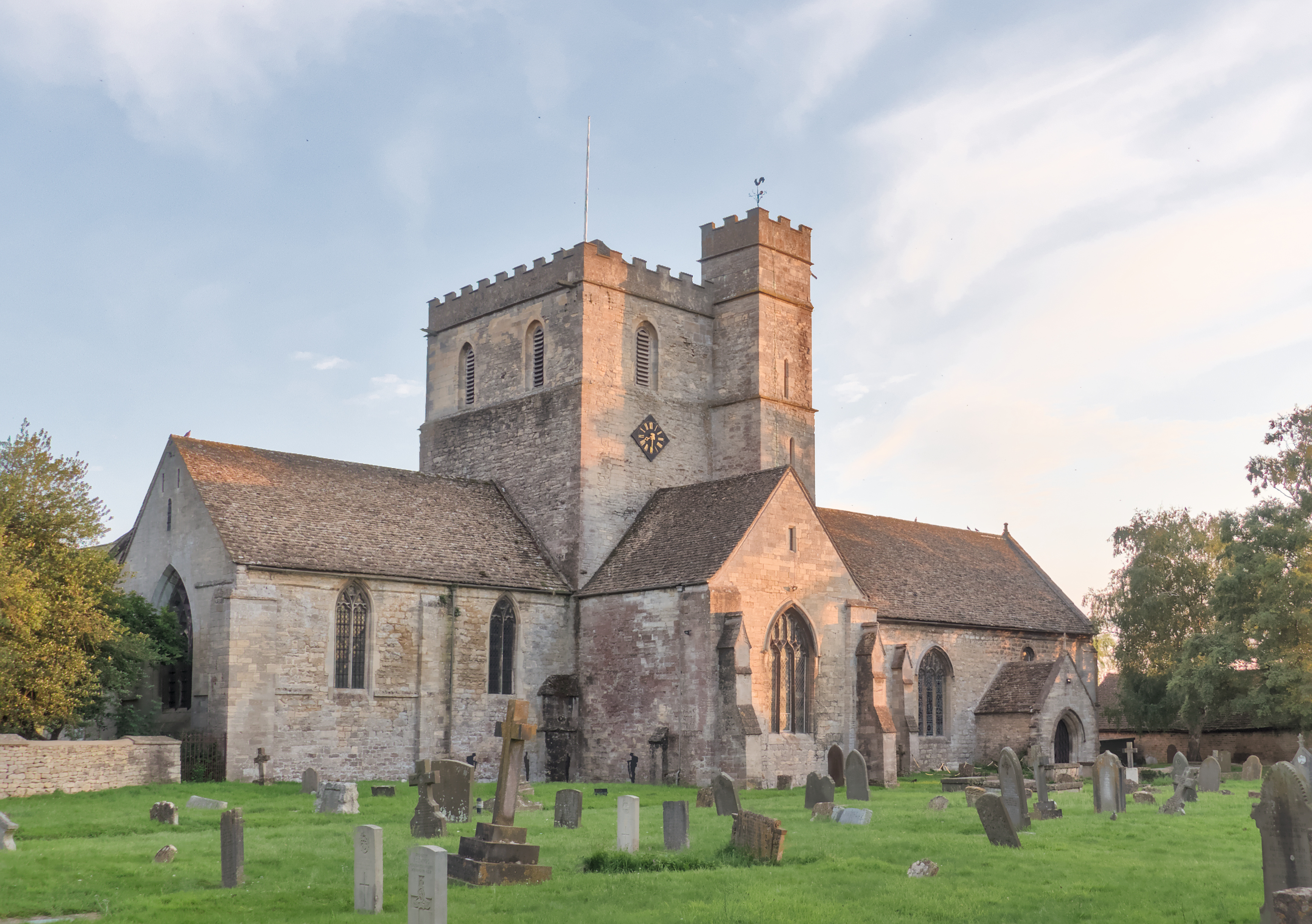
- St. Swithun's church, Leonard Stanley – formerly the Priory Church dedicated to St. Leonard
- Interactive map of Leonard Stanley Priory

Monastery information
- Denomination: Augustinian until 1146 Benedictine after 1146
- Established: c.1130
- Disestablished: September 1538
- Mother house: Gloucester Abbey after 1146
- Dedication: St. Leonard

People
- Founders: Roger de Berkeley, II
- Prior: First: Sabricht c.1130. Last known: John Rodley 1535

Site
- Location: Parish of Leonard Stanley, Gloucestershire
- Country: England
- Coordinates: 51°43′40.87″N 2°17′12.48″W
- Public access: The Priory church is in use as St Swithun's parish church
- Other information: Grade I listed building. Designated 28 June 1960. ref 117487

Leonard Stanley Priory was a priory in Gloucestershire, England. Over the years following the dissolution most of the buildings of the priory complex have been destroyed.

Leonard Stanley is a small village situated about 4 mi (6.4 km) southwest of the town of Stroud in Gloucestershire. A priory dedicated to St Leonard was founded there by the Berkeley family in about 1130. This housed Austin cannons, a secular order of Augustinians. In 1146, the priory was appropriated by Gloucester Abbey and became a Benedictine cell until its dissolution in September 1538.

The priory church, being of Augustinian origin, housed both the conventual and parish churches under a single roof. The church remains in use today as a parish church and is now known as St Swithun's church. On the western wall of the south transept corbel stones that supported the roof of the cloister are visible. Close to the south-west of the church, also extant is a chapel of earlier construction currently in use as a farm building. Nearby to the west is a pond once used as a fish pond by the priory. A large tithe barn built in the 14th century lies nearby.

== Founding of the Priory ==
In 1094, Roger de Berkeley, II, succeeded his father to the honour of Berkeley. In 1116, after consultation with Theulf, Bishop of Worcester, Roger II gave the church of St Leonard to his clerk Sabricht and founded a house of Austin canons sometime between 1128 and 1131.

By 1128, an alien Augustinian house already existed at Beckford, north Gloucestershire, which was connected to the Augustinian Abbey at Sainte-Barbe-en-Auge in Normandy. It is probable that the clerics appointed by Sabricht to assist him at Leonard Stanley came from Beckford. By 1130, Sabricht had become a canon.

The pipe rolls record that Roger II died before Michaelmas 1131 and that the honour of Berkeley was then managed by his nephew, William de Berkeley. Roger's son, Roger de Berkeley, III, eventually returned to claim his inheritance in 1139 or 1140. The reason for this delay in succession is likely due to Roger's absence while away at the Crusades. In the interim, and in accordance with the wishes of the late Roger II, William Berkeley and Sabricht are believed to have supervised construction of the priory church and priory. From the style of the stonework, building does not appear to have been interrupted by the civil unrest of the time. While construction of the priory church was under way, the earlier chapel dedicated to St Leonard served as a place of worship for the monks and the villagers and later as a private and guest chapel for the prior.

There are very few records about the early history of the collegiate foundation. The college was dedicated to St. Leonard and consisted of a small group of canons and the prior. Roger II had endowed the college with gifts of land which included the curacies of Arlingham, Slimbridge, and Uley.

In 1146, a conflict occurred between Roger de Berkeley, III, and Roger Earl of Hereford. As an act of placation, Roger III granted the church and the priory, with all its rights and possessions, to the Benedictine Abbey of St. Peter at Gloucester. This was with the consent of Prior Sabricht and Simon, Bishop of Worcester. This arrangement was brought about through the brokerage of Gilbert Foliot, abbot of Gloucester abbey. The change from an Augustinian to Benedictine house took place during a time of upheaval and civil war, known as ‘the Anarchy’. This conflict occurred between 1135 and 1153 and was between supporters of Empress Matilda and King Stephen. Roger III had sympathies for King Stephen, and, in 1146, was captured and imprisoned by Walter de Hereford who was the brother of Roger, the Earl of Hereford, and a supporter of Empress Matilda. The tithes and profits of the parish were valued at £6 in 1291 and had increased to £7 6s 8d by 1535.

== Dissolution ==
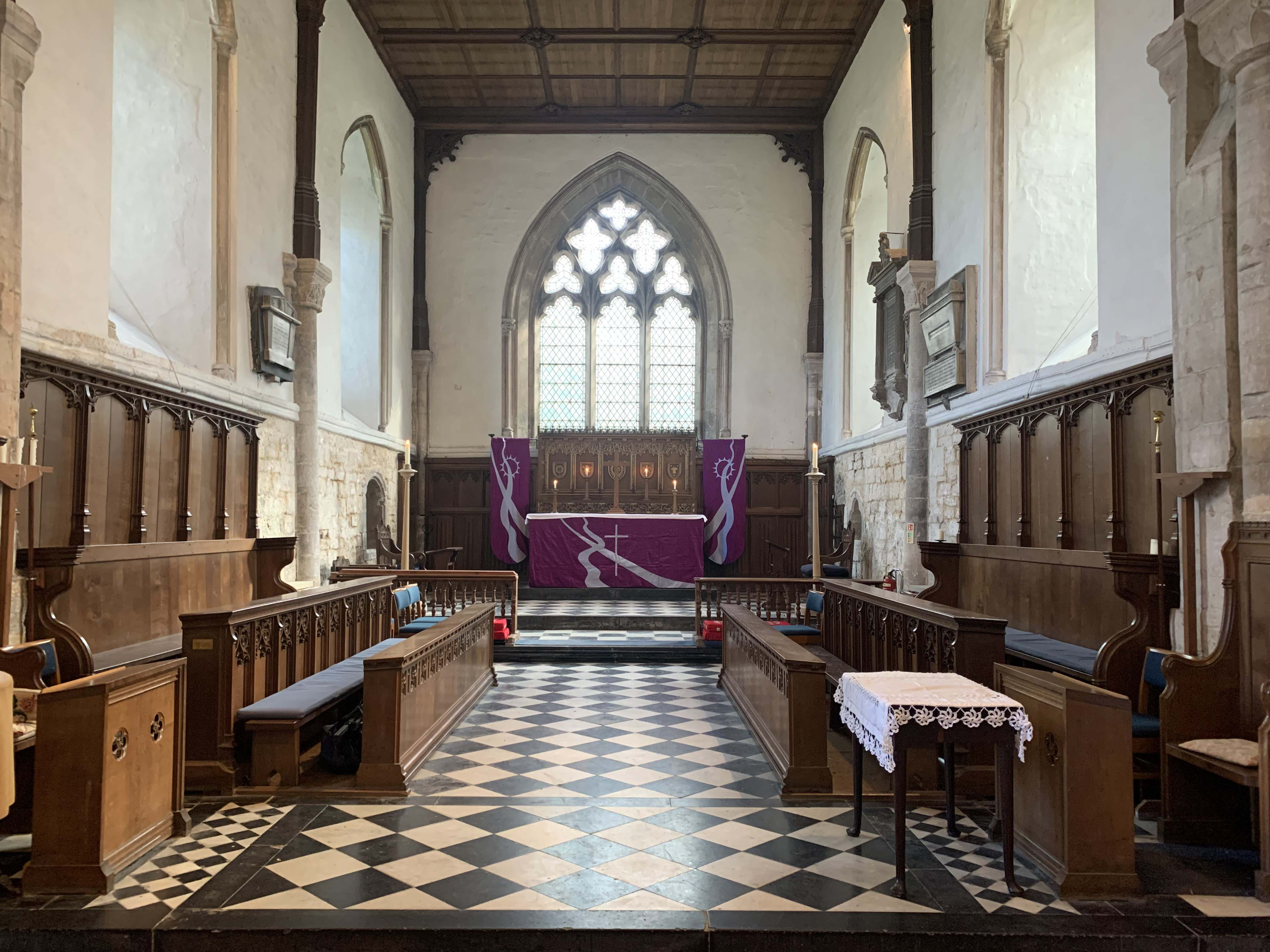
Church Interior St Swithin

In August 1535, Henry VIII and Anne Boleyn spent almost the entire month in Gloucestershire. After staying at Gloucester Abbey, the king travelled to Leonard Stanley arriving there on 6 August 1535. After visiting the priory and staying overnight, he then travelled on to Berkeley the following day. It was almost exactly three years later, on 11 June 1538, that Henry sent an imperative request to the Abbot of Gloucester to recall the monks from Stanley St Leonard. The priory had remained a Benedictine cell until its dissolution in 1538. The number of monks living there throughout the period is unknown though it is likely to have been relatively small, perhaps two or three. Three monks are recorded as being resident at the priory in 1538 when it was dissolved. At the dissolution the gross income of the priory was £126 0s 8d. Annual payments of 5s were made to Nicholas Wikes of the Manor House, £6 to the parish curate and £13 6s 8d to the vicar of Cam.

A ninety-nine-year lease for the priory estate was granted to Sir William Kingston in September 1538. When William died on 14 September 1540, tenure passed to his son, Anthony. In February 1549, Edward VI granted the purchase of the estate to John Sandford. After the dissolution, the curate's stipend was paid by the owners of the priory estate, and parishioners were eventually granted access to the bell tower.

== Priors ==
There is scant information available about the priors of St Leonard Stanley and there are significant gaps in the records. Most of the information comes from electoral records.

1146	Sabricht	Retired as a recluse following the transfer of the cell to Gloucester Abbey.
c.1190	John Crosse	Doctor of divinity. A memorial stone was placed in the North transept and recorded his death in 1190. This stone is now lost. Said to be buried under the vestry floor in the South transept.
1284	Thomas de Tyringham	Voted for the election of Abbot John Gamage.
Unknown	Peter the Prior	No further information found.
1510	William Moyngton	Voted in 1510 for the election of Abbott Newton. By 1516 was the Prior of St. Guthlacs in Hereford.
1516	Richard Wolryge	In 1510 was the prior of Bromfield, and in 1516 voted for Abbot William Parker. He signed the document acknowledging royal supremacy on 31 August 1535.
1535	John Rodley	By October 1535 he was listed as the last prior of Stanley St. Leonard.

== The Priory Site and Buildings ==
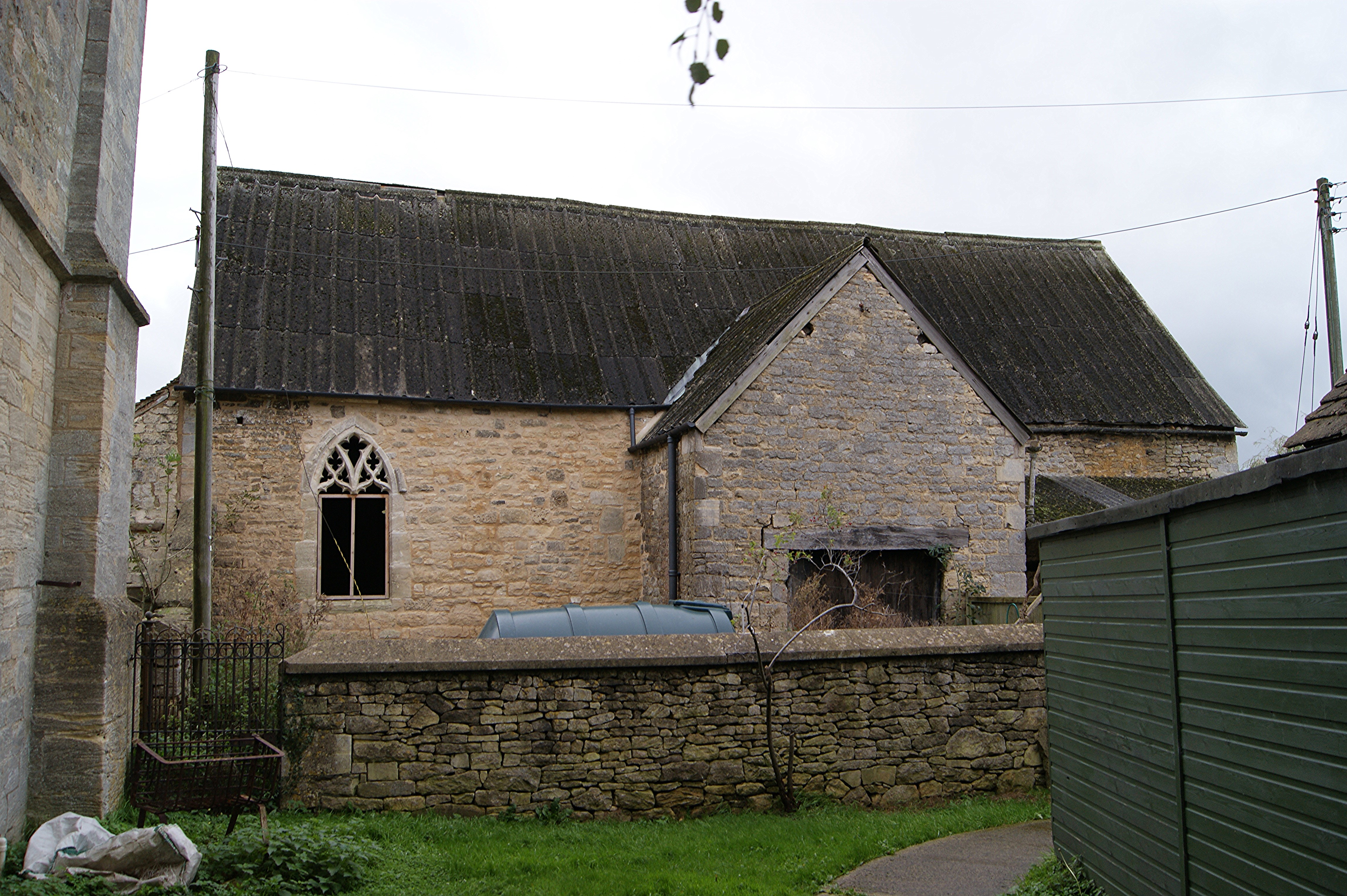
The old chapel in use as a farm building

=== Original church ===
There is no record in the Domesday Book of either a church or priest at Stanley St. Leonard. It is known that a chapel existed by 1116 when it was granted by Roger II de Berkeley to Sabricht. This suggests that the chapel was constructed after the Norman Conquest and is not of the Saxon period. An excavation of the site carried out in 1914 revealed that the original building was rectangular and had an apse at the east end. The masonry of the chapel was of a herringbone pattern, and there was an arched doorway also in the Anglo-Saxon style. These features led Swynnerton to label the earlier chapel as Anglo-Saxon construction. Masons are known to have continued building using the older Saxon methods well into the late 11th and early 12th centuries. This, together with the lack of a record of the church in the Domesday record, supports the current consensus that the chapel was Norman construction. In the 14th century, the church underwent considerable alteration and was extended. Following dissolution it was given over for agricultural purposes and is now in use as a barn which was renovated in 2020.

=== Priory church ===
The priory church built for the regular canons, was constructed sometime between 1130 and 1146. The design is typical of Augustinian churches with a wide aisleless nave, central tower, and transepts. The part of the church to the west of the tower served as the parochial church with the eastern portion for the private use of the canons. A division of the parochial and conventual parts were clearly demarcated by a solid rood screen in the western arch of the tower. Against this stood the high altar of the parish church. Several of the original Norman windows remain. The porch to the north doorway was a later addition in the 14th century. Coloured paintings dating from the 14th century were uncovered during restoration work to the church wall in about 1880. The figures depicted included a kneeling angel, the virgin Mary, and flowing patterns of scrolls and flowers. These paintings deteriorated rapidly after being uncovered and have since been lost.

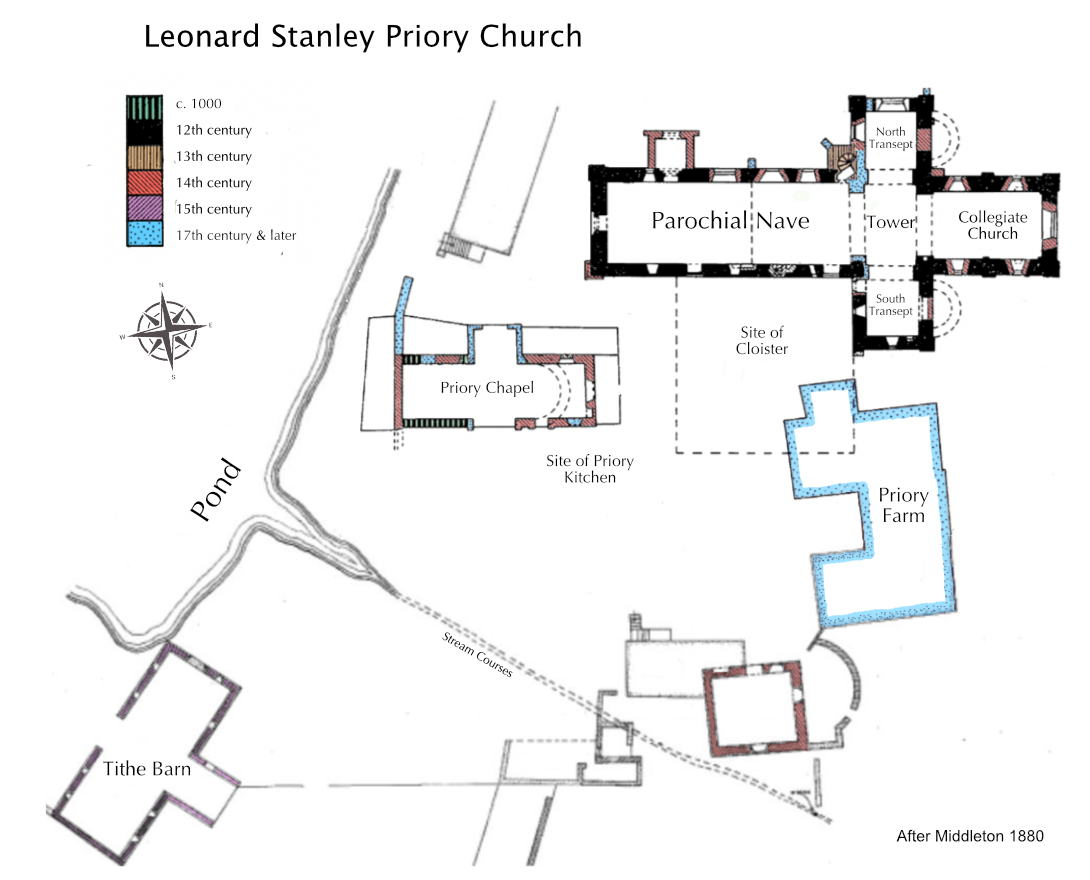
Leonard Stanley Priory site map

=== Church tower ===
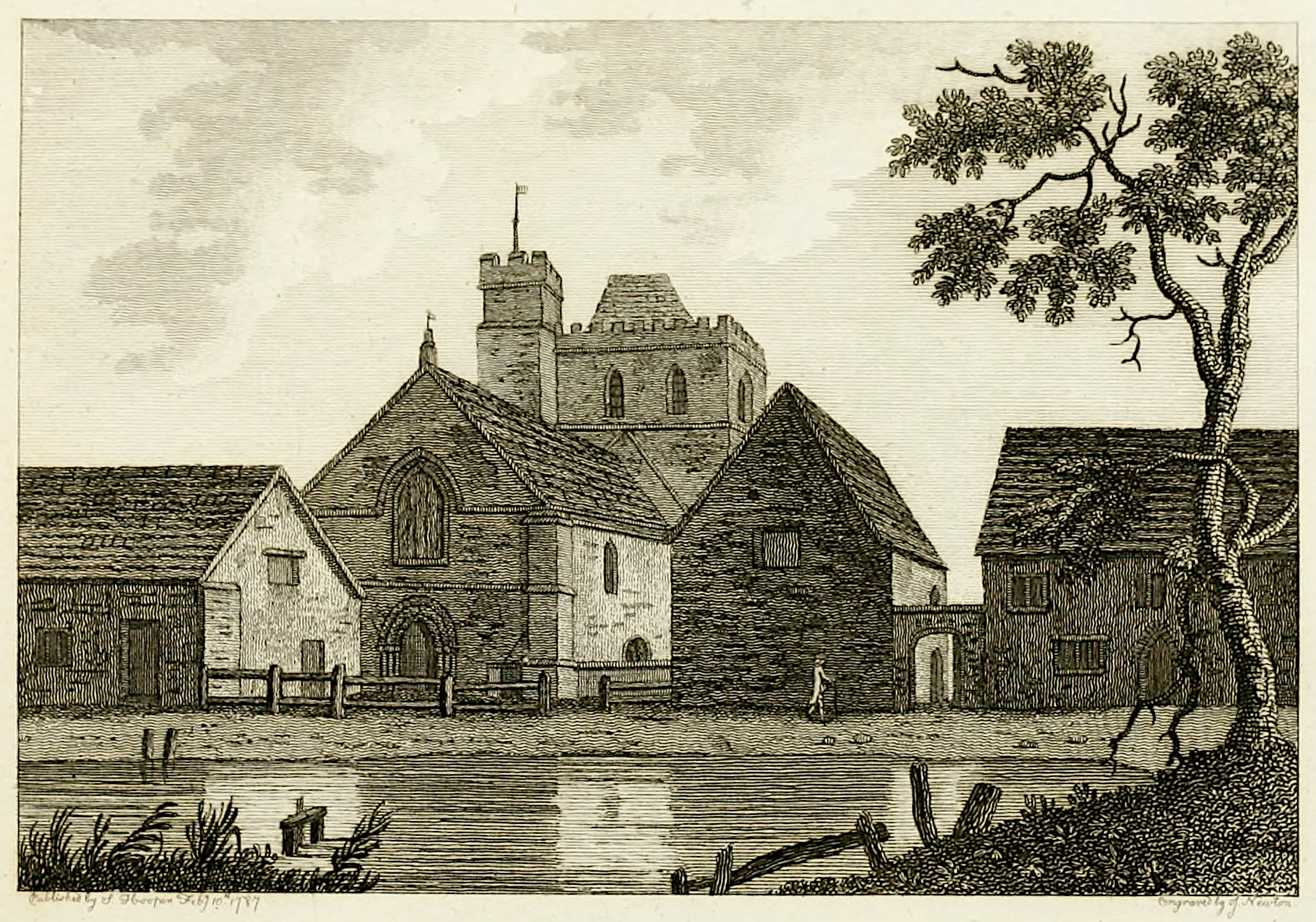
Priory church 1786

The church tower is a substantial structure and originally had a spire. By the 14th century, the tower housed two bells, one of which was cast by Barber at a foundry in Salisbury. By the time of the dissolution, a further two bells had been added. None of the original bells now exist as in 1909 they were melted down and recast with two additional bells being added. Over the years the tower has been strengthened with extensive repairs with further buttressing being added in 1884. Opposite the north entrance to the church the old 'Fieldgate' clock mechanism known as 'Old Solomon' can be seen. This dates from before 1538.

=== Other buildings and structures ===
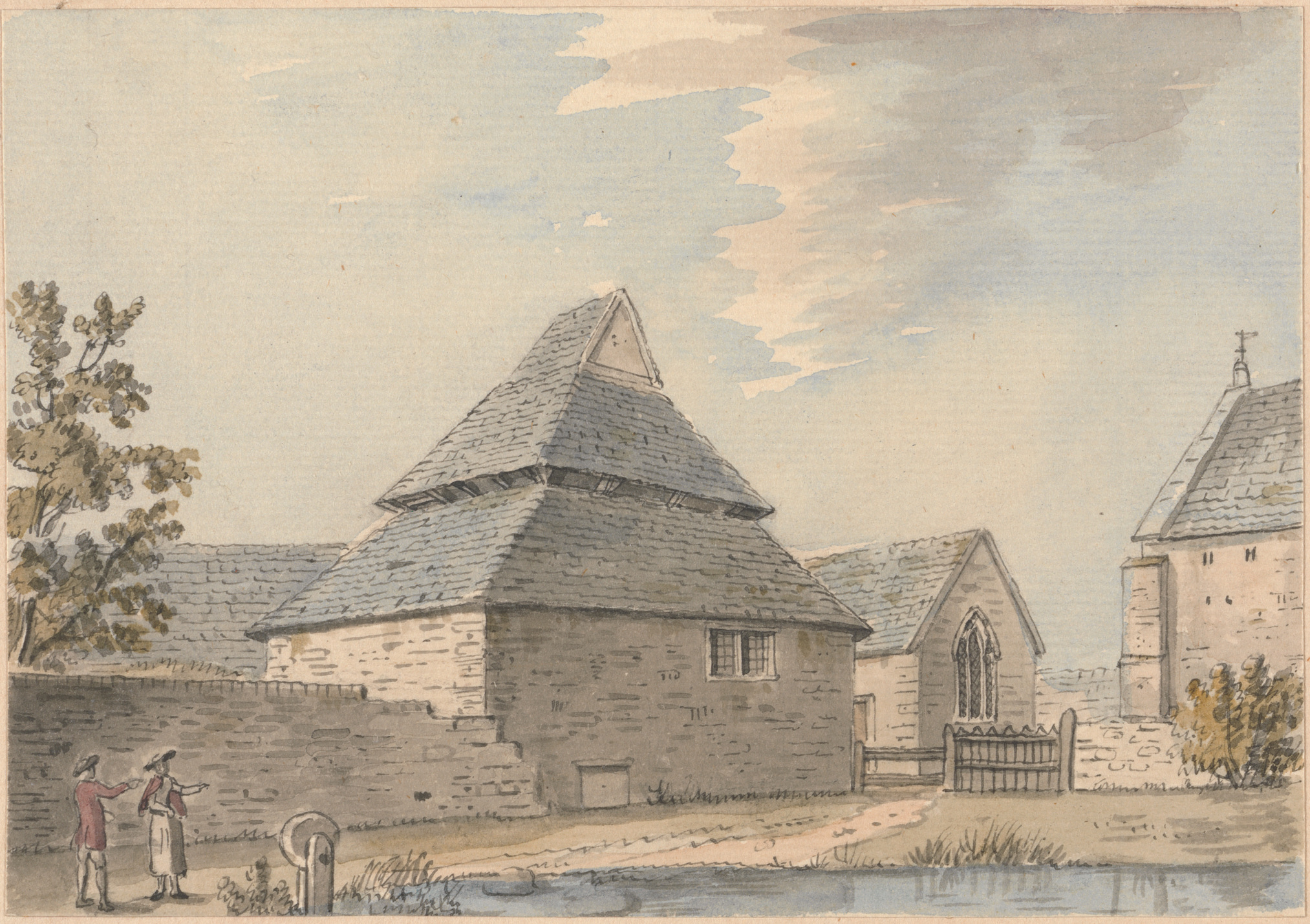
Priory Kitchen with louvered roof and old chapel 1787

Nearby and south of the old chapel was the priory kitchen. This was a square building with a louvered roof which was converted to a dairy for the farm and still existed in 1787 but had been demolished by 1834. The pond to the west of the chapel was originally more extensive than it is today with much of it having been filled in over the last hundred years. This pond is believed to have been a fish pond used by the priory. The rest of the remains of the conventual buildings are no longer visible and lie below ground. Of later construction was a church house adjoining the churchyard built in about 1502. This was situated opposite the north transept and initially housed the church wardens and served as a poorhouse from 1750. This building was demolished in the early part of the 19th century.

=== Stonework and sculptures ===
There are marked similarities between the sculptures at both Old Sarum Cathedral and Leonard Stanley priory church. Common features include the bulbous shapes of the eyes and deeply punctuated pupils. This indicates that the stone carving at Leonard Stanley may have been carried out by either the Old Sarum Master or one of his associates. There are similarities too with the sculptures attributed to the Herefordshire school which was active between c.1130 and c.1160. These characteristics include large hands, bulbous eyes, and cap like hair which are seen in the Leonard Stanley sculptures.

Several of the sculptures are of particular interest and may assist with the dating of the priory church. Set in the south wall of the chancel above the aumbry is a relief of two animals representing ‘the Temptation in the Garden of Eden’. From the unusual iconography used, this work appears to have been influenced by the Augustinian theologian Hugh of St. Victor whose ideas spread across England around 1134. This suggests a date for the sculpture of after 1134 and before 1146. The two orders of chevrons on the doorways and the dragon-head label stops are also helpful and indicative that the completion of the building work occurred between the 1140s and 1150s. The construction time for the priory church has been estimated at 10 to 15 years based on similar buildings in England of the period.

Another unusual sculptural feature is an animal's head with deeply drilled out ears, eyes, and nostrils which is situated on the west wall of the tower. This, too, is akin to the work at Old Sarum cathedral. The head appears to be that of a bull. In Christian Iconography, the bull or ox is an animal associated with St. Luke though the reason for this sculpture and the positioning of it is not understood.

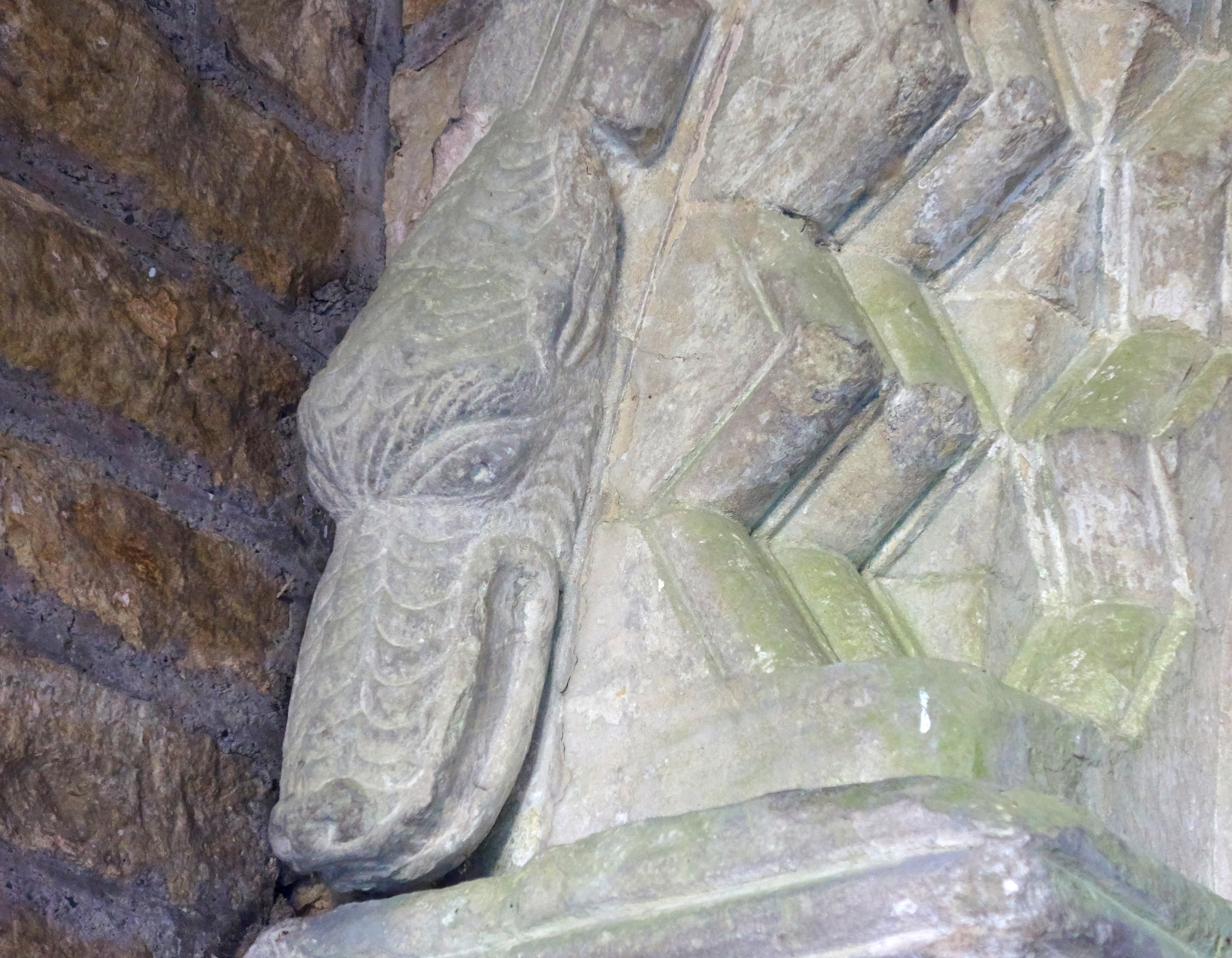
Dragon head label stop, north doorway

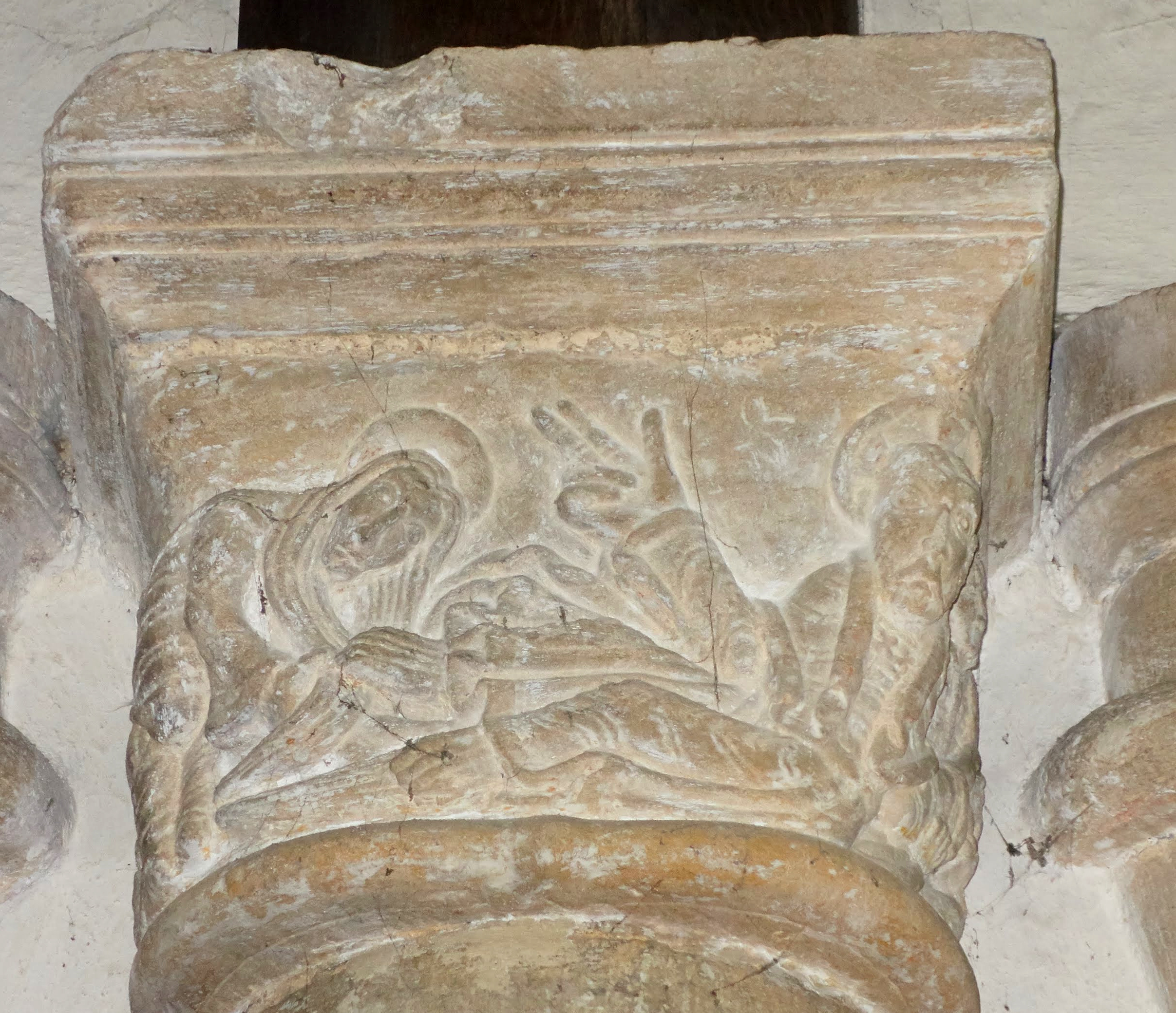
Capital, north chancel

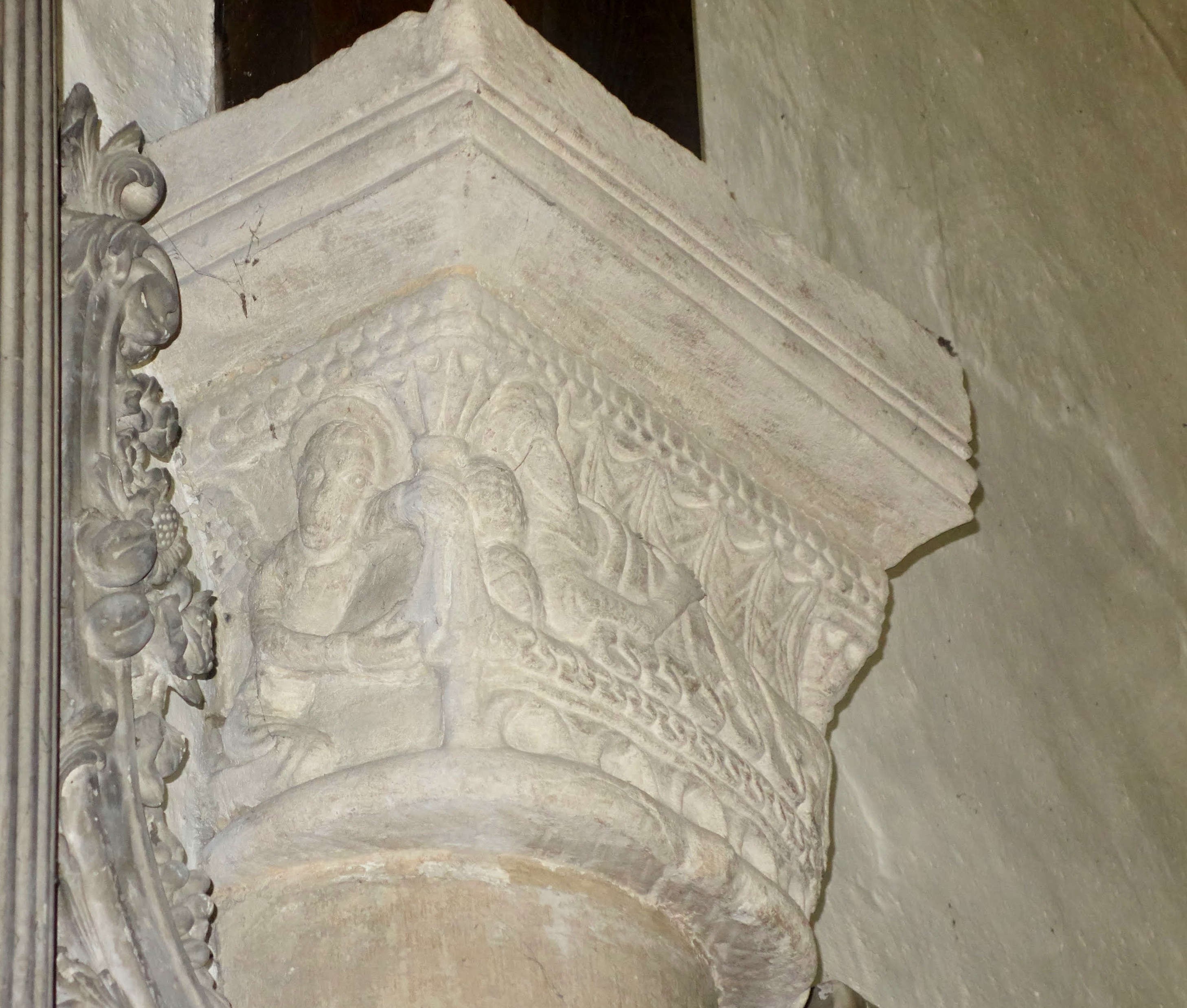
Capital, south chancel

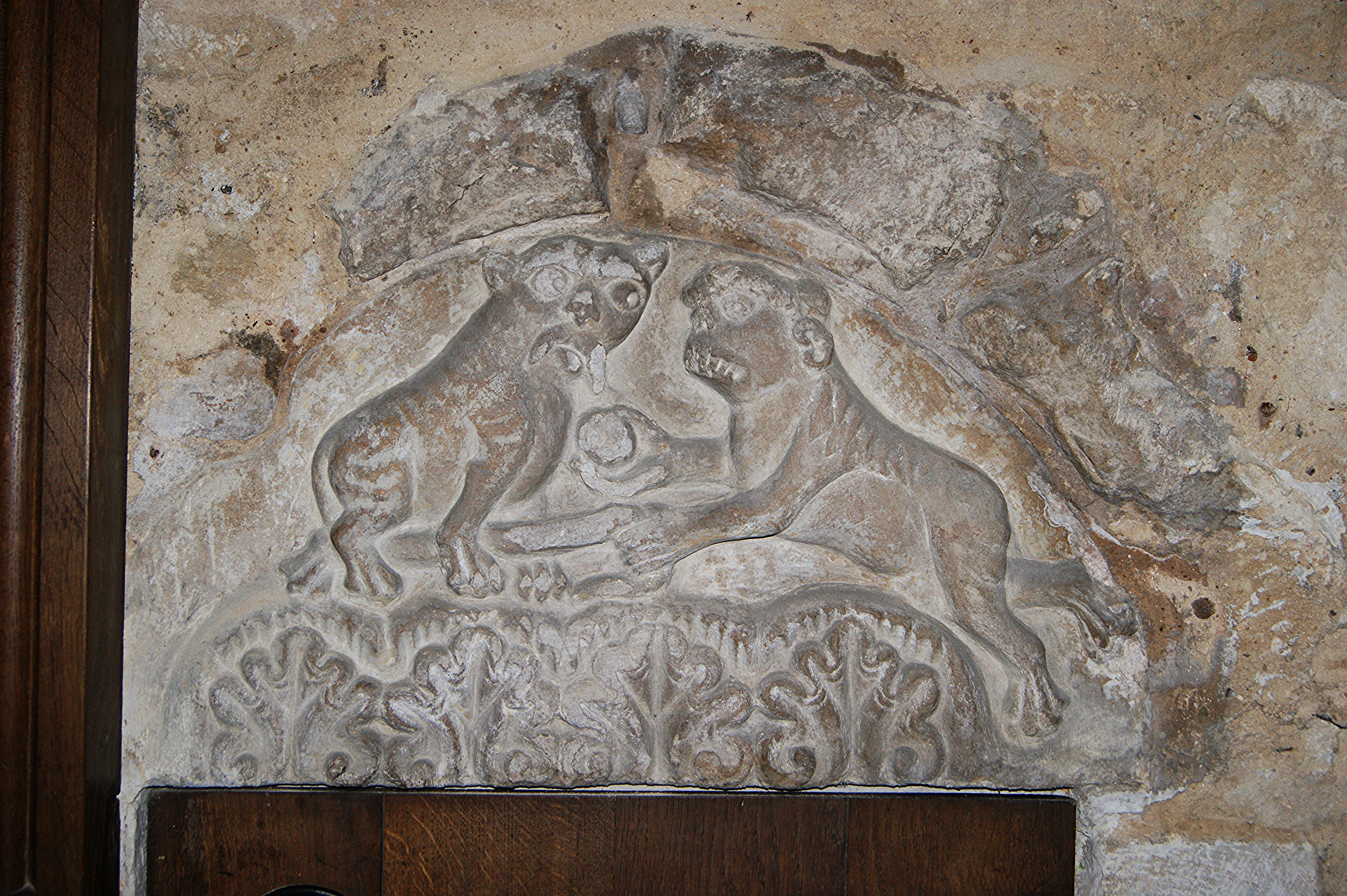
The Temptation above aumbry, south chancel

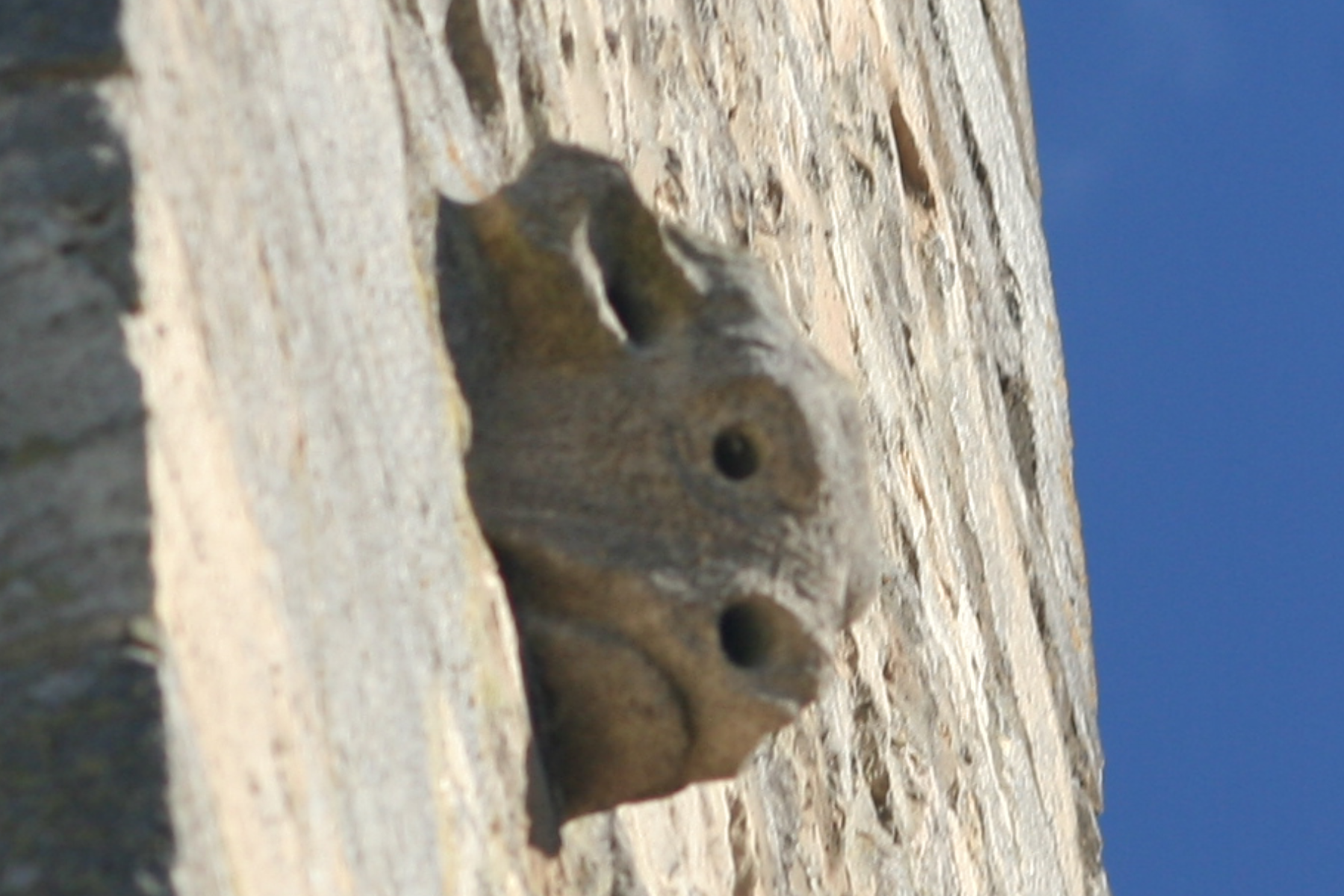
Bull's Head Carving
