= Churchend, Eastington =

Hamlet in Gloucestershire, England

Coordinates: 51.751°N 2.317°W

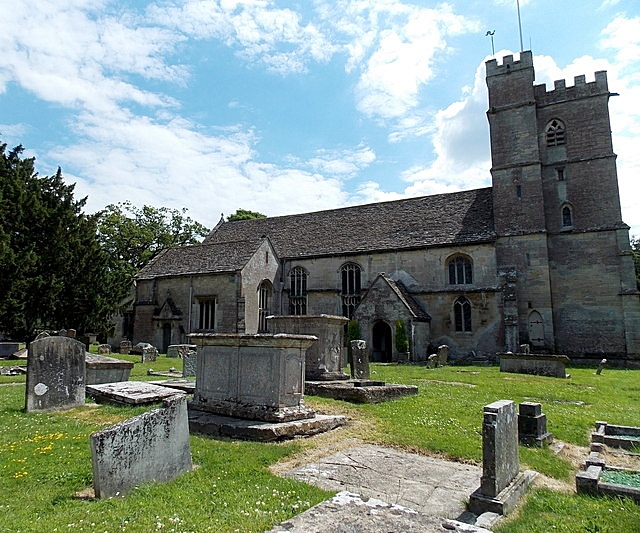
St Michael and All Angels church

Churchend is a hamlet in Gloucestershire, England, 4 miles (6.4 km) west of Stroud. It is part of the civil parish of Eastington.

The church of St Michael and All Angels dates from the 14th century and is a grade II* listed building.
