= Oldbury Brook =

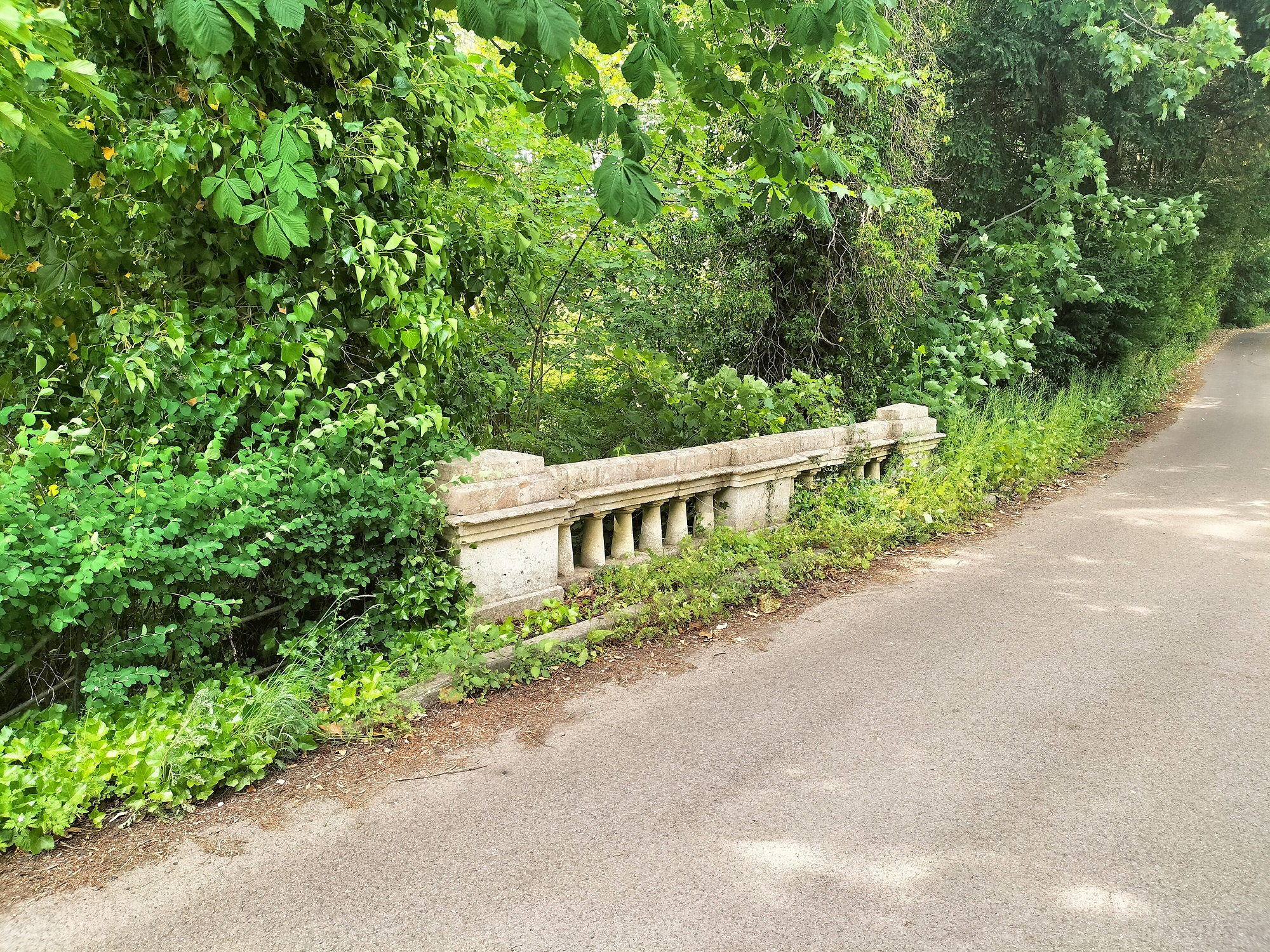
- The bridge parapet on the drive to Oldbury House

- Location within Gloucestershire

Location
- Country: England
- Counties: Gloucestershire

Physical characteristics
- Source
  - location: Maiden Hill, Stonehouse
  - coordinates: 51.7552°N 2.2651°W
- Mouth
  - location: River Frome
  - coordinates: 51.7535°N 2.3224°W

Oldbury Brook is a small river in the English county of Gloucestershire. Its lower section has been modified several times, most recently in 2025 as part of the restoration of the Stroudwater Navigation.

== Course ==
The brook rises just above the 330-foot (100 m) contour on the western flank of Maiden Hill, to the north-east of Stonehouse. It flows to the west, dropping below the 165-foot (50 m) contour as it runs along the northern edge of the housing of Stonehouse. It passes under the B4008 Gloucester Road and continues along the edge of the housing until it reaches two railway lines. The first is the Golden Valley line, Stroud to Gloucester section, and the second is the Bristol to Birmingham line. The brook is culverted under both.

The brook then runs through the parish of Great Oldbury, heading to the south-west. Great Oldbury Drive crosses it, after which the industrial area of Oldends is on the left bank, while the houses of Nastend are on the right bank. It then turns to the north-east, to run parallel to the A419 road. It is crossed by Nastend Lane, with a farm access bridge immediately downstream, and by a small bridge on the drive to Bridgeways, Oldbury House. The house was built by Roland Paul in 1833, and was originally a rectory, but was later used as St. George's Diocesan Training School. In the 1980s, it became a therapeutic home for adolescents.

The brook is culverted under the Chipmans Platt roundabout on the A419 road and then passes under a minor road that serves the William Morris School. The school provides day and boarding places for children between the ages of 7 and 19 with complex learning needs. The brook continues along the southern edge of the school grounds to reach the Stroudwater Navigation, where a new culvert for it was built in 2025, to enable the canal to be restored over it. It continues in a south-westerly direction to meet the River Frome to the west of the former Meadow Mill, now an industrial unit.

== History ==
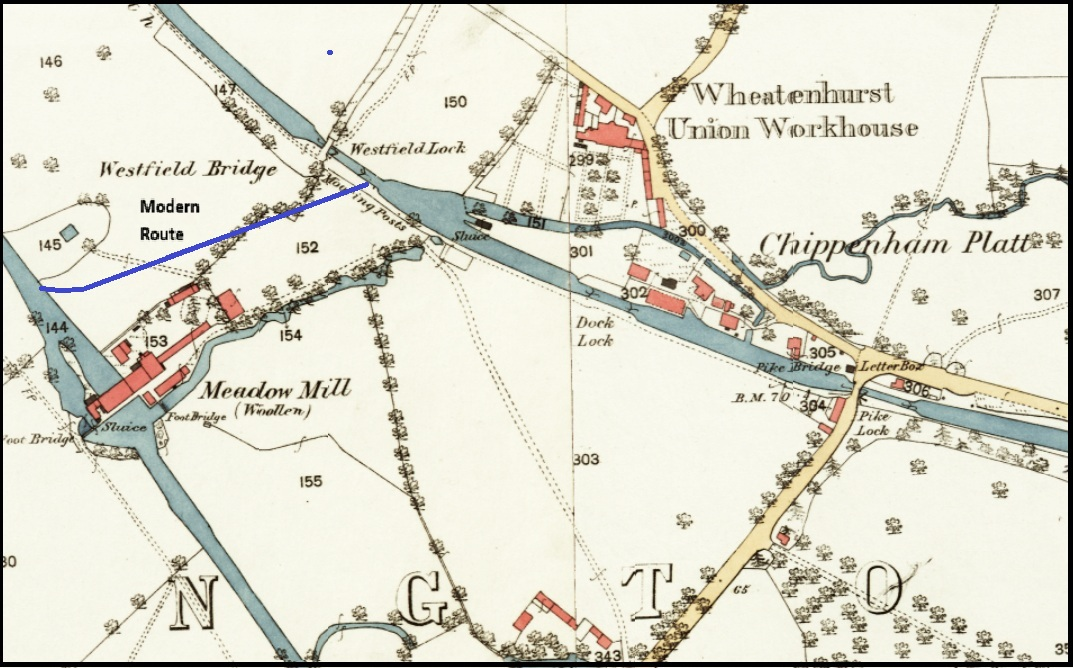
The mouth of the Oldbury Brook in 1880, with its modern course overlaid

Oldbury Brook originally flowed into the River Frome, but in the 1790s, the Stroudwater Navigation was built, and this cut across the course of the brook. The Ordnance Survey map for 1880 shows that the brook was diverted into the canal just above Westfield Lock, and there was a spill weir or sluice on the south bank of the canal, which allowed most of the water to flow into the original channel, from where it discharged into the River Frome. To the north of the canal, the brook was enlarged, and became known as Back Brook, since it served the back of the canal company's maintenance yard, and was used to deliver materials. It was also used as a temporary mooring space for vessels which were due to go into the nearby dry dock, or which needed further work to be carried out after they had left the dry dock. Some boat owners abandoned vessels in Back Brook, and the canal company threatened to charge them because their boats were causing an obstruction, or had actually sunk there.

In the early 1800s, the cloth trade was flourishing locally, and to supplement the two cloth mills in Eastington, Meadow Mill was built in 1811. It was just below the confluence of Oldbury Brook and the River Frome, so that water from the brook increased the flow in the river to power the mill. It was later supplied with coal by the canal, and continued to make cloth until 1906, after which it manufactured various types of board products. In the 1830s, a group of parishes built a workhouse next to the brook at Eastington. This was known as the Wheatenhurst Union Workhouse by 1880. A wharf was built on the brook, and boats delivered stone to the workhouse, which the residents broke up for use on local roads. The building is now part of the William Morris School. The Back Brook was sufficiently important that when some of it was used for keeping ducks in the 1880s, the canal manager threatened to knock the structure down by ramming it with a boat.

The Stroudwater Canal had a maintenance yard, which was located on the land between the canal and the brook. It included a dry dock, which was filled with water from the canal, when boats needed to be floated in or out of the dock. When a boat needed work to be done, the dock was drained into Oldbury Brook by a culvert. While the canal was operational, Oldbury Brook flowed into it, and the surplus water flowed over Meadow Mill spill weir on the southern side of the canal. To prevent significant changes in level on the canal, the weir crest was long, and the overflow weir could be used to reduce the level of the pound for maintenance, or to empty it altogether. When the M5 motorway was constructed, and parts of the canal were filled in, the Oldbury Brook was diverted into a new channel that ran to the west of the original course. Subsequently, the spill weir only had to divert surplus water coming down the lock flight into the Frome.

The construction of the new deep channel for Oldbury Brook resulted in the top end of Westfield Lock being damaged significantly. When restoration of the lock began, the engineering consultancy Rodgers Leask designed a triple pipe culvert and a slab to protect the pipes from users of the canal. During the construction of the culvert, Oldbury Brook was diverted into the canal, and overflowed via the spill weir into its original channel. The new culvert consists of three 2-foot (600 mm) pipes and is 138 feet (42 m) long. The pipes were embedded in stone before a concrete raft was poured over them, which forms the bed of the canal and supports the end of the restored lock, now renamed John Robinson lock. Additional rock and concrete have been used to reinforce the banks of the brook, to reduce erosion where the water leaves the pipes.

On the final section below the culvert, some clearance work was undertaken, to remove fallen trees and split willow from the channel to improve the flow of water. Early indications were that the culvert would probably need mesh guards to prevent debris from entering the pipes. Wet weather in late 2025 resulted in large quantities of debris and rubbish being carried downstream.

== Bibliography ==
- Hadfield, Charles (1969). The Canals of South and South East England. David and Charles. ISBN 978-0-7153-4693-8.
- Pashby, Tom (14 November 2024). "Designs underway on aqueduct to fill Stroudwater Navigation canal's 'missing mile'". New Civil Engineer. Archived from the original on 14 November 2025.
