= Alkerton, Gloucestershire =

Village in Gloucestershire, England

Coordinates: 51.747°N 2.329°W

Alkerton
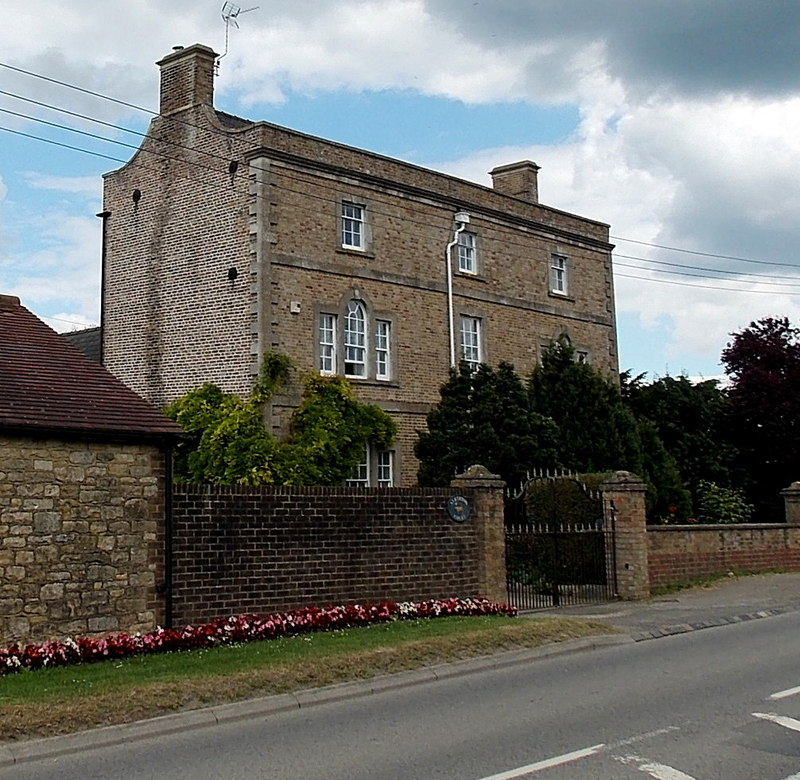
- Alkerton Court

- Location within Gloucestershire
- OS grid reference: SO773054
- Civil parish: Eastington
- District: Stroud
- Shire county: Gloucestershire
- Region: South West
- Country: England
- Sovereign state: United Kingdom
- Police: Gloucestershire
- Fire: Gloucestershire
- Ambulance: South Western

Alkerton is a hamlet and former village in Eastington parish in the Stroud district of Gloucestershire, England. It lies just north-west of Eastington village and about 2 miles (3 km) west of Stonehouse. The M5 motorway is nearby.
