= Brimscombe Bridge Halt railway station =

Disused railway station in England

Coordinates: 51.7174°N 2.1913°W

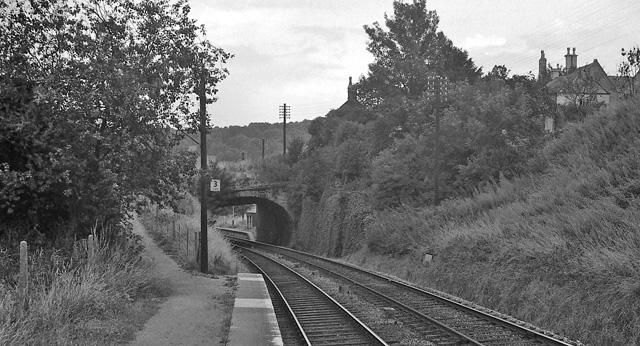
Brimscombe Bridge Halt railway station in 1961

Brimscombe Bridge Halt was opened on 1 February 1904 on what is now the Golden Valley Line between Kemble and Stroud. This line was opened in 1845 as the Cheltenham and Great Western Union Railway from Swindon to Gloucester and this was one of many small stations and halts built on this line for the local passenger service. This halt opened following the introduction of the GWR steam railmotor services between Stonehouse and Chalford. The halt was between Brimscombe and Stroud, and featured staggered platforms either side of the overbridge for the local road "Brimscombe Hill", with the down platform (towards Stroud) on the East side and the up platform (towards Kemble) on the West. Access to the basic wooden platforms was from the overbridge. Each with GWR pagoda style shelters soon after opening and electric lighting was installed in February 1939 at an estimated cost of £90.

Closure of the halt came on 2 November 1964 following the withdrawal of local stopping passenger services on the line. No trace of the halt remains today, but there are some traces of the access paths.

== Services ==
This halt was served by the Gloucester to Chalford local passenger services, known as the Chalford Auto.

Preceding station	Disused railways	Following station
Ham Mill Halt; Line open, station closed	Great Western Railway; Cheltenham and Great Western Union Railway	Brimscombe; Line open, station closed
