= Ham Mill Halt railway station =

Railway station in Gloucestershire, England

Coordinates: 51.7278°N 2.2055°W

Ham Mill Halt
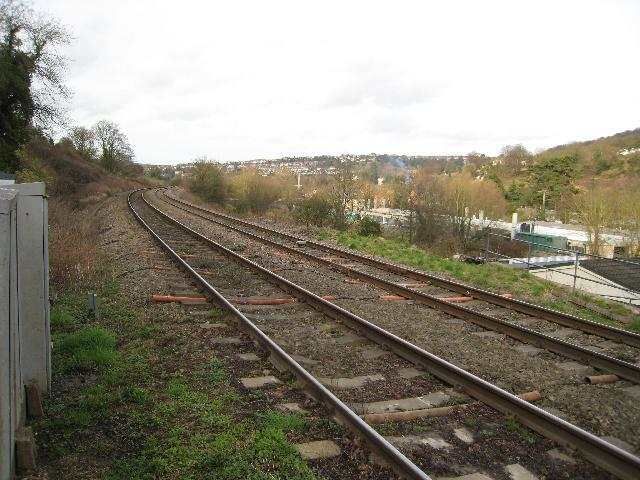
- The site of the station in 2008

General information
- Location: Stroud, Gloucester; England
- Platforms: 2

Other information
- Status: Disused

History
- Original company: Great Western Railway
- Pre-grouping: Great Western Railway
- Post-grouping: Great Western Railway

Key dates
- 12 October 1903: Opened as Ham Mill Crossing
- July 1957: Name changed to Ham Mill Halt
- 2 November 1964: Closed
Location

Ham Mill Halt was opened on 12 October 1903 on what is now the Golden Valley Line between Kemble and Stroud. This line was opened in 1845 as the Cheltenham and Great Western Union Railway from Swindon to Gloucester and this was one of many small stations and halts built on this line for the local passenger service. This halt opened with the introduction of the GWR steam railmotor services between Stonehouse and Chalford.

The halt was between Brimscombe and Stroud, at the end of Ham Mill Lane, and was originally opened as Ham Mill Crossing Halt before being renamed in July 1957. The halt consisted of a wooden crossing and a pair of platforms, each with GWR pagoda style shelters. Electric lighting was installed 1939 at an estimated cost of £108. Electric treadles and bells were provided either side of the crossing to warn passengers of trains approaching.

Closure of the halt came in November 1964 following the withdrawal of local stopping passenger services on the line. No trace of the halt remains today.

== Services ==
This halt was served by the Gloucester to Chalford local passenger services, known as the Chalford Auto.

| Preceding station | Disused railways | Following station |
|---|---|---|
| Bowbridge Crossing Halt; Line open, station closed | Great Western Railway; Cheltenham and Great Western Union Railway | Brimscombe Bridge Halt; Line open, station closed |
