= Purton railway station =

Former railway station in England

Purton
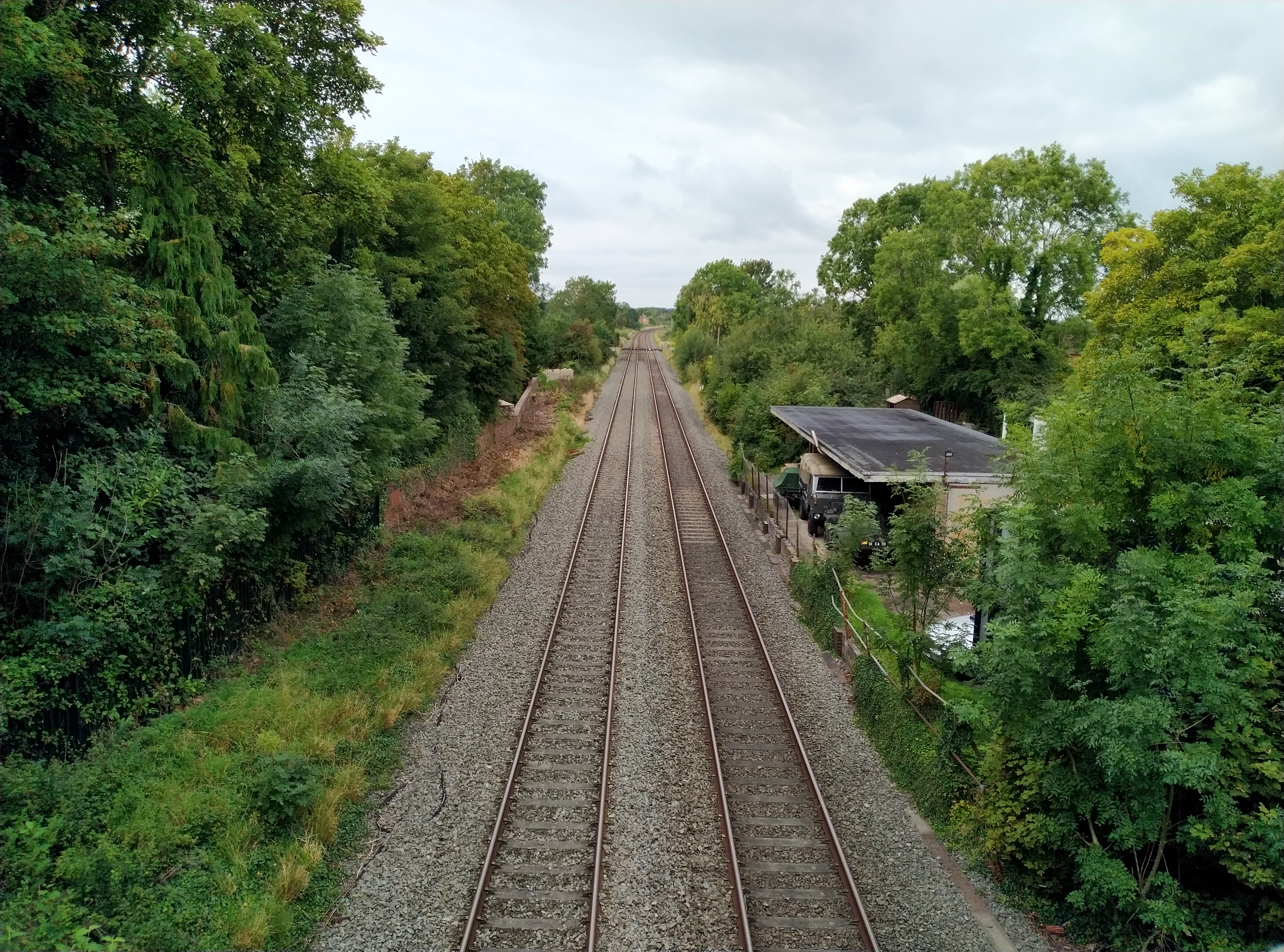
- The former Purton Station seen from Widham road bridge in August 2023

General information
- Location: Purton, Wiltshire; England
- Coordinates: 51.5939°N 1.8664°W
- Grid reference: SU093883
- Platforms: 2

Other information
- Status: Disused

History
- Original company: Cheltenham and Great Western Union Railway
- Pre-grouping: Great Western Railway
- Post-grouping: Great Western Railway

Key dates
- 31 May 1841: Station opened
- 2 November 1964: Station closed
Location

Purton railway station was in operation on the Swindon to Gloucester line in Wiltshire, England, between 1841 and 1964.

The Cheltenham and Great Western Union Railway through Purton parish was opened in 1841 and was absorbed by the Great Western Railway in 1843. Purton station opened when services began in 1841, in the hamlet of Widham, about 700 metres north of Purton village at the bridge over the Purton-Cricklade road. British Railways closed the station in 1964 but the line remains open. The booking office building survives with a small part of its platform.

To the west of the station was a goods yard, and beyond it a private siding for a brickworks.

Trains run along the Golden Valley Line through from London Paddington via Reading, Didcot Parkway and Swindon, then past the three closed stations of Purton, Minety and Oaksey Halt to Kemble, continuing to Stroud, Stonehouse, Gloucester and Cheltenham Spa. When engineering work closes the Severn Tunnel, trains from Paddington to Swansea are diverted from the Great Western Main Line and South Wales Main Line via Bristol Parkway to run via Kemble to Gloucester, then along the Gloucester to Newport LineCaldicot before rejoining the normal line at Severn Tunnel Junction.

Originally laid as dual-track, British Rail reduced the line between Kemble and Swindon to single-track in 1968. Network Rail investigated the options for reinstating the second track, along with the estimated cost (see Golden Valley Line). In the 2011 Budget the Government announced that funding for the redoubling was to be provided and the works were completed in August 2014.

Preceding station	Historical railways	Following station
Minety and Ashton Keynes; Line open, station closed	Great Western Railway; Cheltenham and Great Western Union Railway	Swindon; Line and station open
