= St Mary's Crossing Halt railway station =

Railway station in Gloucestershire, England

Coordinates: 51.7188°N 2.1666°W

St Mary's Crossing Halt was opened on 12 October 1903 on what is now the Golden Valley Line between Kemble and Stroud. This line was opened in 1845 as the Cheltenham and Great Western Union Railway from Swindon to Gloucester and this was one of many small stations and halts built on this line for the local passenger service. This halt opened with the introduction of the GWR steam railmotor services between Stonehouse and Chalford.

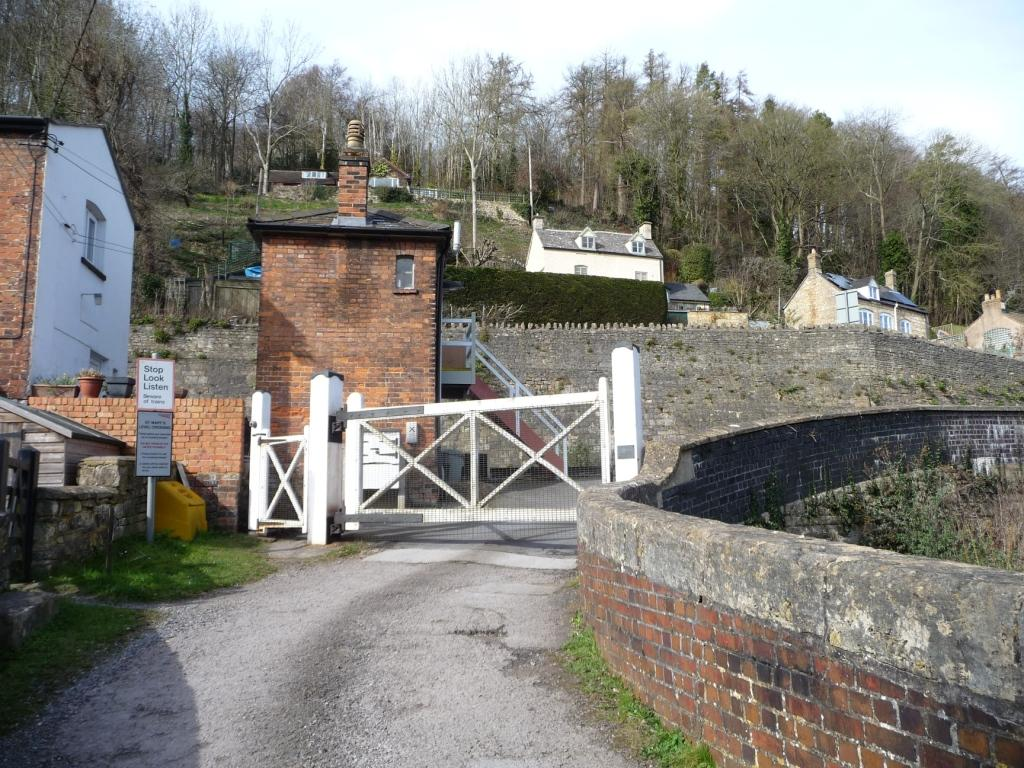
Signal box at St Mary's crossing

St Mary's Crossing is a minor level crossing for an access road between Brimscombe and Chalford. The halt was built immediately east of this crossing and was situated at the western end of the St Mary's viaduct which carried the line over the Thames and Severn Canal. The halt featured two wooden platforms, GWR pagoda style shelters, and uniquely for the halts in the Stroud Valley, a metal footbridge, which was provided after a young lady was killed crossing the line. On the other side of the level crossing on the down side was the St Mary's Crossing signal box.

Closure of the halt came in November 1964 following the withdrawal of local stopping passenger services on the line. No trace of the halt remains today, but the signal box still exists to control the level crossing to St Mary's Mill.

== Services ==
This halt was served by the Gloucester to Chalford local passenger services, known as the Chalford Auto.

Preceding station	Disused railways	Following station
Brimscombe; Line open, station closed	Great Western Railway; Cheltenham and Great Western Union Railway	Chalford; Line open, station closed
