= Bowbridge Crossing Halt railway station =

Disused railway station in England

Coordinates: 51.7363°N 2.2087°W

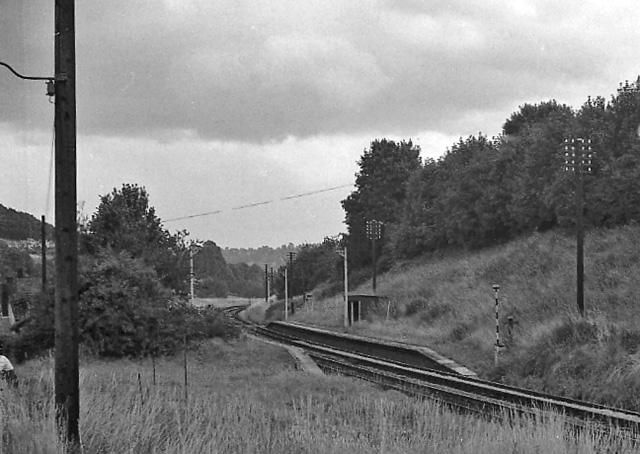
Bowbridge Crossing Halt railway station in 1961

Bowbridge Crossing Halt was opened on 1 May 1905 on what is now the Golden Valley Line between Kemble and Stroud. This line was opened in 1845 as the Cheltenham and Great Western Union Railway from Swindon to Gloucester and this was one of many small stations and halts built on this line for the local passenger service. This halt opened with the introduction of the GWR steam railmotor services between Stonehouse and Chalford.

The halt was between Brimscombe and Stroud, on the minor road "Butterow Hill" between Bowbridge and Rodborough Common. The halt originally consisted of a pair of ground level platforms and a wooden crossing, but the platforms were subsequently replaced by standard height platforms. GWR pagoda style shelters were provided but these were later replaced by rectangular metal shelters. Access to the halt was from the adjacent level crossing, and Electric treadles and bells were provided warning passengers and other pedestrians of trains approaching.

Closure of the halt came in November 1964 following the withdrawal of local stopping passenger services on the line. No trace of the halt remains today, but the wooden crossing still exists, approached with steps made from old railway sleepers.

== Services ==
This halt was served by the Gloucester to Chalford local passenger services, known as the Chalford Auto.

Preceding station	Historical railways	Following station
Stroud; Line and station open	Great Western Railway; Cheltenham and Great Western Union Railway	Ham Mill Halt; Line open, station closed
