= Downfield Crossing Halt railway station =

Railway station in Paganhill, Stroud, England

Downfield Crossing Halt
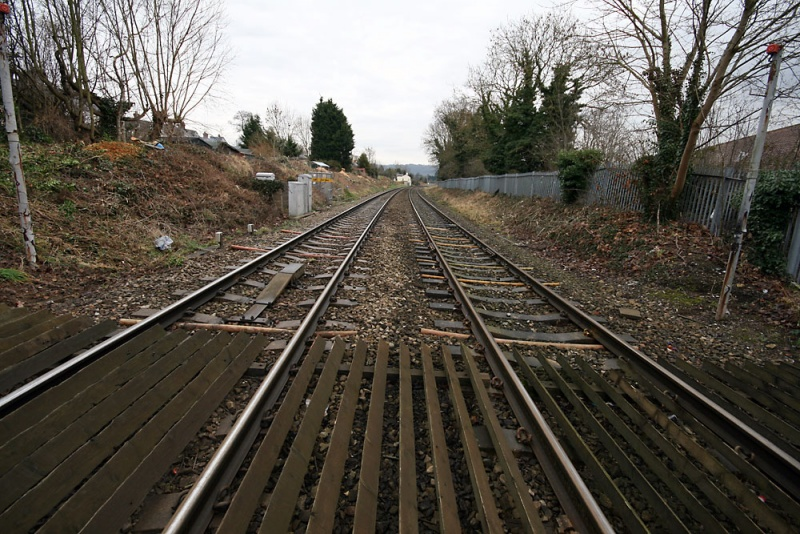
- The site of Downfield Crossing Halt in 2009

General information
- Location: Paganhill, Stroud; England
- Coordinates: 51.746°N 2.2348°W
- Grid reference: SO838053
- Platforms: 2

Other information
- Status: Disused

History
- Original company: Great Western Railway
- Pre-grouping: Great Western Railway
- Post-grouping: Great Western Railway

Key dates
- 12 October 1903: Station opened
- 2 November 1964: Station closed
Location

The railway station Downfield Crossing Halt was on what is now the Golden Valley Line between Stroud and Stonehouse in England.

== History ==
The line was opened in 1845 as the Cheltenham and Great Western Union Railway from Swindon to Gloucester and this was one of many small stations and halts built on this line for the local passenger service. This halt opened on 12 October 1903 with the introduction of the GWR steam railmotor services between Stonehouse and Chalford.

The halt was between Stroud and Stonehouse, and originally consisted of a pair of ground level platforms, but was these subsequently replaced by standard height platforms along with GWR pagoda style shelters, c. 1920. The platforms were later reconstructed with brick. Access to the halt was from the adjacent level crossing.

Closure of the halt came on 2 November 1964 following the withdrawal of local stopping passenger services on the line. No trace of the halt remains today.

== Services ==
This halt was served by the Gloucester to Chalford local passenger services, known as the 'Chalford Auto'.

Preceding station	Disused railways	Following station
Cashes Green Halt; Line open, station closed	Great Western Railway; Cheltenham and Great Western Union Railway	Stroud; Line and station open
