= Minety and Ashton Keynes railway station =

Former railway station in England

Minety and Ashton Keynes
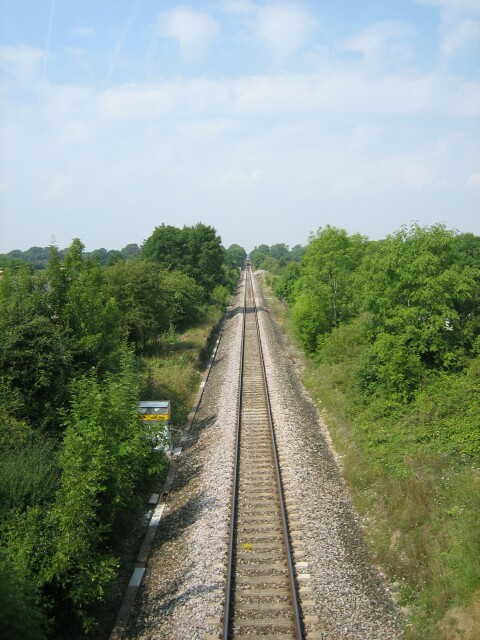
- Station site in 2005

General information
- Location: Minety, Wiltshire, Wiltshire; England
- Coordinates: 51.6147°N 1.9516°W
- Grid reference: SU034906
- Platforms: 2

Other information
- Status: Disused

History
- Original company: Cheltenham and Great Western Union Railway
- Pre-grouping: Great Western Railway
- Post-grouping: Great Western Railway

Key dates
- 31 May 1841: Opened as Minety
- 18 August 1905: Renamed Minety and Ashton Keynes
- 2 November 1964: Closed
Location

Minety and Ashton Keynes railway station served the village of Minety in Wiltshire, England. It was opened in 1841 on the former Cheltenham and Great Western Union Railway line from Gloucester to Swindon; it was originally called just Minety.

The Cheltenham and Great Western Union connected to the South Wales Railway in Gloucester and to the Great Western Railway at Swindon. The Cheltenham and Great Western Union and the South Wales lines were both later absorbed by the Great Western Railway, which provided the train services on the line. In 1905 the station was renamed Minety & Ashton Keynes. In 1948 the Great Western Railway was nationalised and the station thereafter was owned by British Rail. Although the line remains open the station closed in November 1964 and has been demolished, except for parts of the platforms.

Trains run along what is now called the Golden Valley Line from London Paddington via Reading, Didcot Parkway and Swindon, then past the three closed stations of Purton, Minety and Oaksey Halt to Kemble, continuing to Stroud, Stonehouse, Gloucester and Cheltenham Spa. When engineering work closes the Severn Tunnel, trains from Paddington to Swansea are diverted from the Great Western Main Line and South Wales Main Line via Bristol Parkway, to then run through Minety and via Kemble to Gloucester, then along the Gloucester to Newport Line through Lydney, Chepstow and Caldicot before rejoining the normal line at Severn Tunnel Junction.

Originally built as dual track, British Rail reduced the line between Kemble and Swindon to single track in 1968. Network Rail investigated the options for reinstating the second track, along with the estimated cost (see Golden Valley Line). In the 2011 Budget the Government announced that funding for the redoubling was to be provided and the work was completed in August 2014.

Preceding station	Historical railways	Following station
Oaksey Halt; Line open, station closed	Great Western Railway; Cheltenham and Great Western Union Railway	Purton; Line open, station closed
