= Chalford railway station =

Former railway station in England

Chalford
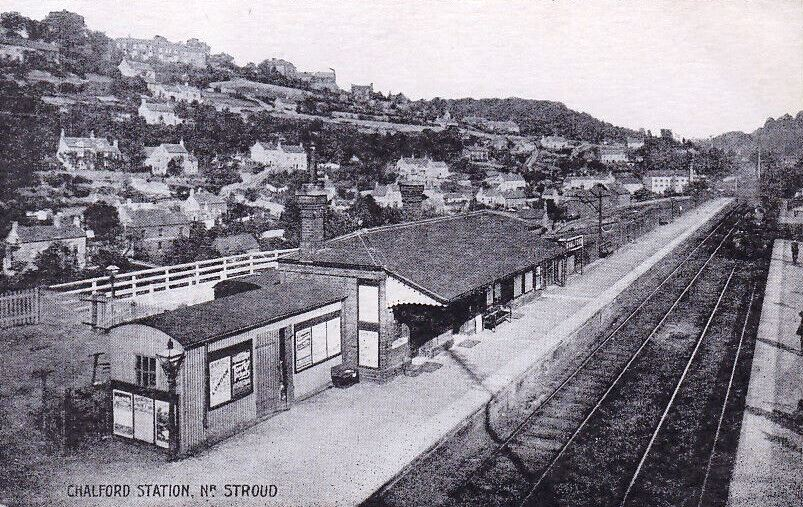

General information
- Location: Chalford, Stroud; England
- Coordinates: 51.7207°N 2.1483°W
- Grid reference: SO898024
- Platforms: 2

Other information
- Status: Disused

History
- Original company: Great Western Railway
- Pre-grouping: GWR
- Post-grouping: GWR

Key dates
- 2 August 1897: Station opened
- 2 November 1964: Station closed
Location

Chalford railway station was situated on the Great Western Railway's Golden Valley Line, between Swindon and Gloucester. It was just east of the bridge carrying Cowcombe Hill over the railway. To the east of the station site lies Chalford Viaduct, and beyond that, Sapperton Long Tunnel.

== History ==
The Great Western Railway (GWR) line between Kemble and Gloucester – which had been planned by the Cheltenham and Great Western Union Railway – had opened on 12 May 1845, but no station was originally provided at Chalford: to the south-east was Tetbury Road, and to the west Brimscombe. On 2 August 1897, a new station was opened at Chalford.

There were two platforms, a signal box, sidings and cattle pens. At one time there was also a shed for the steam railmotor.

On 12 October 1903, the GWR introduced a steam railmotor service along the route between Stonehouse and Chalford, serving the existing stations at Stroud and Brimscombe as well as four new stopping places, each of which was situated close to a level crossing: St Mary's Crossing, Ham Mill Crossing, Downfield Crossing and Ebley Crossing.

In 1933, Chalford station issued 98,109 passenger tickets and 282 season tickets; it forwarded 7,632 parcels and 66 tons of general goods; goods received included 99 tons of coal and coke, 321 tons of other minerals, 305 tons of general goods; and the station handled 143 trucks of livestock.

Goods traffic ceased on 12 August 1963, and the station closed on 2 November 1964. The signal box remained in use until 13 June 1965.

== Routes ==
| Preceding station | Historical railways | Following station |
|---|---|---|
| St Mary's Crossing Halt; Line open, station closed | Great Western Railway; Cheltenham and Great Western Union Railway | Tetbury Road; Line open, station closed |
