= Brimscombe railway station =

Disused railway station in England

Brimscombe
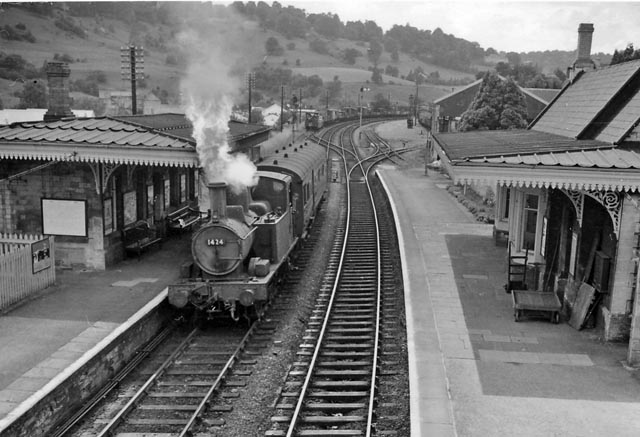
- The station in July 1961

General information
- Location: Brimscombe, Stroud; England
- Coordinates: 51.717853°N 2.180331°W
- Grid reference: SO877021
- Platforms: 2

Other information
- Status: Disused

History
- Original company: Cheltenham and Great Western Union Railway
- Pre-grouping: Great Western Railway
- Post-grouping: Great Western Railway

Key dates
- 1 June 1845: Opened as Brimscomb
- circa June 1865: Renamed Brimscomb near Chalford
- circa 1887: Renamed Brimscombe near Chalford
- 2 August 1897: Renamed Brimscombe
- 2 November 1964: Closed
Location

Brimscombe was opened on 1 June 1845 on what is now the Golden Valley Line between Kemble and Stroud in Gloucestershire. This line was opened in 1845 as the Cheltenham and Great Western Union Railway from Swindon to Gloucester, and this station opened 3 weeks after the general opening of the line, originally as "Brimscomb". The station was renamed as "Brimscomb near Chalford" in June 1865 and finally to Brimscombe on 2 August 1897.

The main building was on the up side (towards Kemble) and consisted of a Brunel style chalet building with a large canopy and a bay window. On the down platform, a large waiting shelter with canopy was provided and a covered footbridge was provided in 1898 following the death of a young woman crossing the line. A large stone good shed with timber ends was provided along with several sidings at the west end of the station on up side. Originally, a small signal box stood at the west end of the down platform, but this was replaced with a new west box in July 1896 and an east box on the up platform in 1898, following the increase in freight traffic.

At the eastern end of up platform, a small engine shed with an integral water tower over the entrance was built. This was used by banking engines based at Brimscombe that assisted freight trains up the 1 in 75 Sapperton Bank beyond Chalford. The 1934 GWR locomotive allocation lists 2-6-2T 31xx class no.3171 as based at Brimscombe and in the 1960s this would have been a 2-6-2T of the 51xx or 61xx classes.

Closure of the station came on 2 November 1964 following the withdrawal of local stopping passenger services on the line. Goods traffic had ceased the previous year on 12 August 1963. Almost all traces of the station have gone and it appears that the adjacent A419 road has been realigned through the eastern side of the station.

== Stationmasters ==
- Charles Henry Tuckett 1856 - 1871 (formerly station master at Melksham)
- Richard Dance Woodyatt 1871 - 1900
- J.H. Wilding 1900 - 1906 (formerly station master at Newent)
- F.W. Michael 1906 - 1908
- Edward James Faulkner from 1908 (formerly station master at Tetbury)
- William Henry Penson 1917 - 1929
- W.H. Bunting 1930 - 1938
- Walter John Butt Watts until 1942 (afterwards station master at Kemble)

== Services ==
This halt was served by the Gloucester to Chalford local passenger services, known as the Chalford Auto.

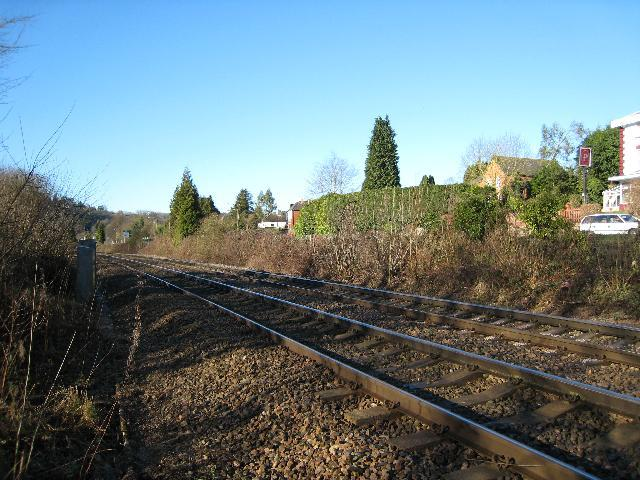
Brimscombe station site today bereft of platforms in January 2008.

Preceding station	Historical railways	Following station
Brimscombe Bridge Halt; Line open, station closed	Great Western Railway; Cheltenham and Great Western Union Railway	St Mary's Crossing Halt; Line open, station closed
