= Oaksey Halt railway station =

Former railway station in England

Oaksey Halt
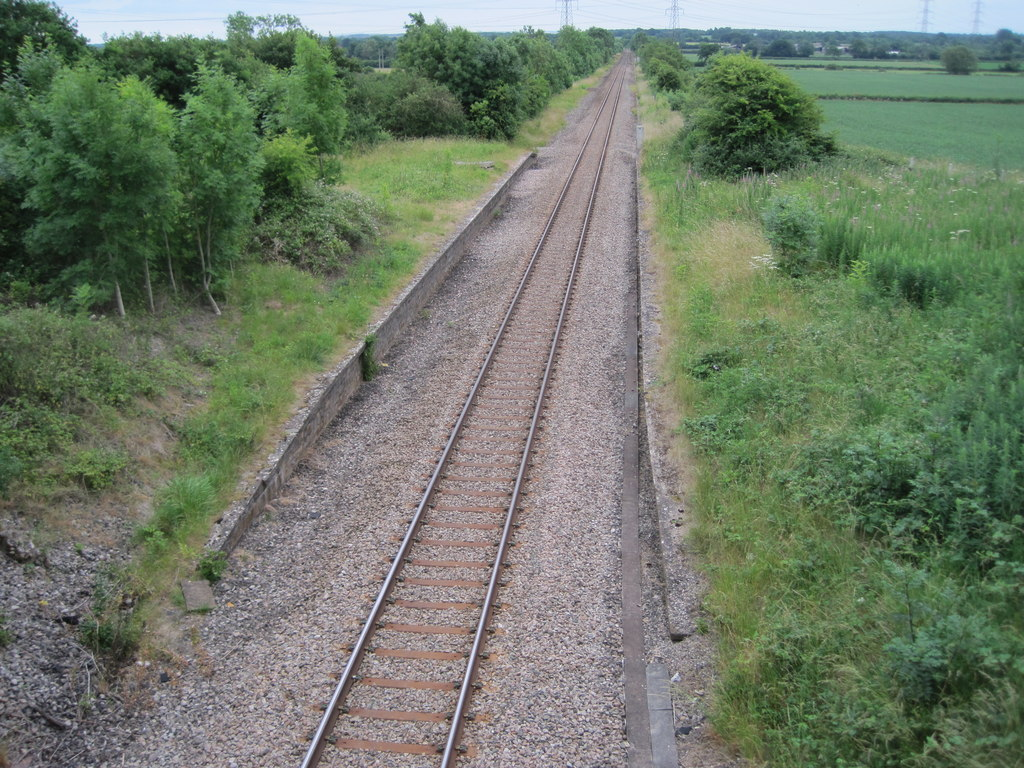
- The site of Oaksey Halt railway station in July 2010

General information
- Location: Oaksey, Wiltshire; England
- Coordinates: 51.6426°N 2.0000°W
- Grid reference: SU000937
- Platforms: 2

Other information
- Status: Disused

History
- Original company: Great Western Railway
- Post-grouping: Great Western Railway

Key dates
- 18 February 1929: Station opened
- 2 November 1964: Station closed
Location

Oaksey Halt is a closed station on the Golden Valley Line south of Kemble railway station and Kemble Tunnel on the line to Swindon.

There were short (150 ft) stone platforms, each with a small corrugated iron shelter. After the halt was closed in 1964, the platform on the up London Paddington line remained until October 2013 when it was dismantled as part of the Swindon to Kemble redoubling works.

Preceding station	Historical railways	Following station
Kemble; Line and station open	Great Western Railway; Cheltenham and Great Western Union Railway	Minety and Ashton Keynes; Line open, station closed
