= Stonehouse railway station =

Railway station in Gloucestershire, England

Stonehouse
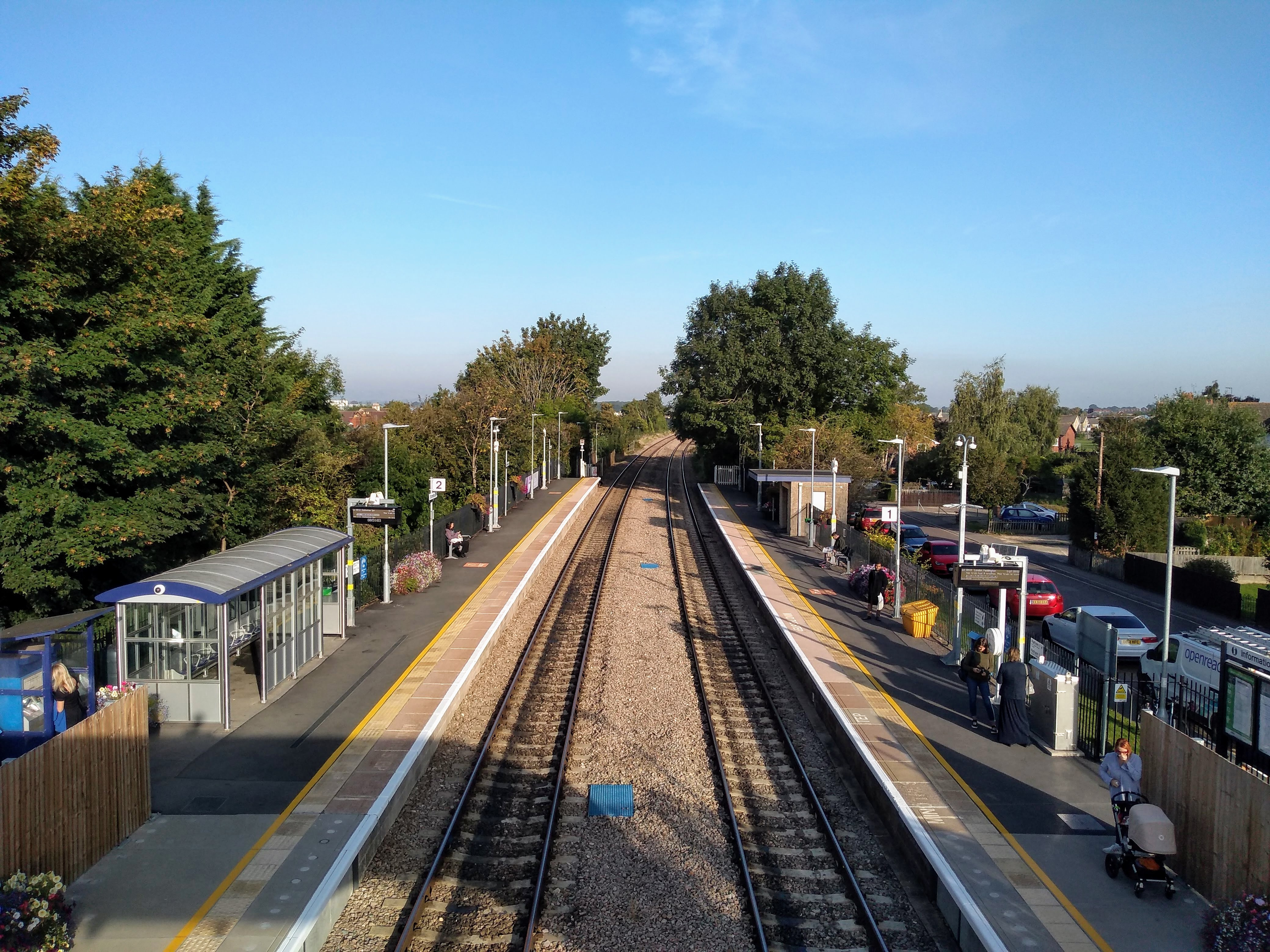

General information
- Location: Stonehouse, Stroud; England
- Coordinates: 51.746°N 2.280°W
- Grid reference: SO808052
- Manager: Great Western Railway
- Platforms: 2

Other information
- Station code: SHU
- Classification: DfT category E

Key dates
- 1 June 1845: opened
- 17 Sept.1951: renamed Stonehouse Burdett Road
- 6 May 1968: renamed Stonehouse

Passengers
- 2021/22: ▲0.123 million
- 2022/23: ▲0.157 million
- 2023/24: ▲0.173 million
- 2024/25: ▲0.193 million
- 2025/26: ▲0.205 million
Location
Notes
- Passenger statistics from the Office of Rail and Road

Stonehouse railway station serves the town of Stonehouse in Gloucestershire, England. The station is a stop on the Golden Valley Line between Swindon and Gloucester; it is located 104 miles 74 chains (168.9 km) down the line from London Paddington.

== History ==
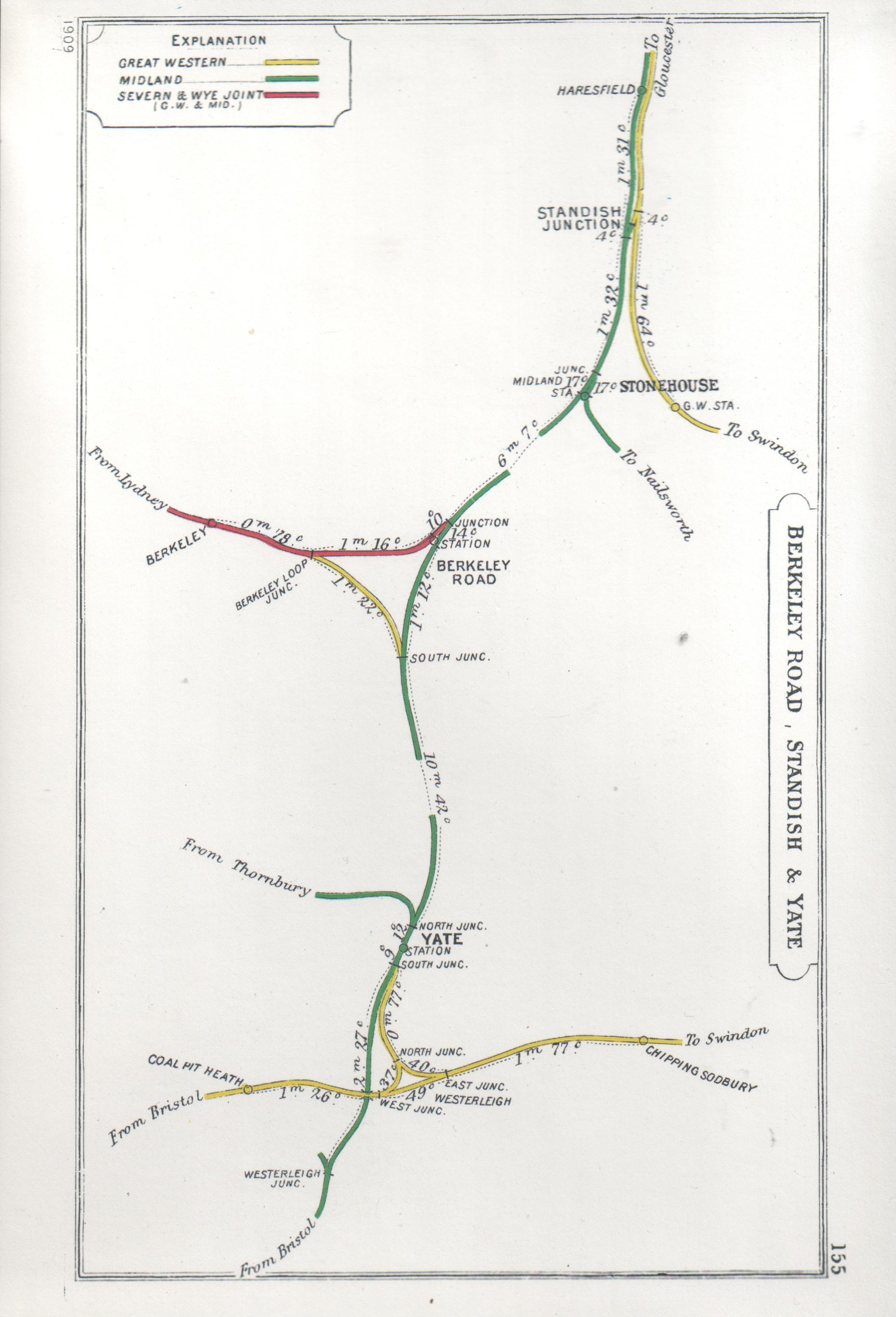
A 1909 Railway Clearing House map of railways in the vicinity of Stonehouse, shown here as G.W. STA.

The station was formerly called Stonehouse Burdett Road to distinguish it from a second station, Stonehouse (Bristol Road), on the line between Bristol and Gloucester. Stonehouse Bristol Road closed to passengers under the Beeching Axe in 1965 and to goods traffic the following year.

== Description ==
The station has two platforms, and is operated by Great Western Railway. The station has a ticket office, located on the Gloucester-bound platform; it is normally only open in the mornings, until the end of the peak period.

The platforms were originally short: only about 55 yards (50 m) each. This was long enough to accommodate the two-coach trains used on Swindon – Cheltenham Spa local services; but Class 800s running to or from London or Cheltenham Spa may be up to nine coaches. Since long trains cannot be accommodated entirely, such trains running towards Gloucester stopped with the front two coaches in the platform, and those running toward London normally stop with the rear two in the platform. Passengers intending to alight at Stonehouse are advised earlier in their journeys to proceed along the train to the relevant coaches. Since trains from Cheltenham reverse at Gloucester, this can lead to confusion for cyclists as to which end of the train in which to load their bicycles.

== Station upgrade ==
In December 2017 the station completed a £300,000 upgrade. The work included ground levelling, improved access and a new footbridge.

In 2018, improvements were made to the provision of service information for passengers, comprising the installation of LED dot-matrix passenger information screens and the provision of automated announcements.

Works to extend the short platforms by around 100m were completed in 2019. These changes were required for introduction of Class 166 trains, which are longer than the previous rolling stock used on the line.

== Services ==
Great Western Railway operate services from London Paddington to Gloucester and Cheltenham Spa using Class 800s, and limited local services from Swindon to Gloucester and Cheltenham using Class 165 two carriage sets. Trains call hourly in each direction Monday to Saturday. On Sundays, hourly services run between Cheltenham and Swindon with three services a day going onwards to or originating from Paddington.

Preceding station	National Rail	Following station
Gloucester	Great Western Railway; London/Swindon - Cheltenham	Stroud
Gloucester	Great Western Railway; Cheltenham-Westbury	Stroud
	Historical railways	
Gloucester; Line and station open	Great Western Railway; Cheltenham and Great Western Union Railway	Ebley Crossing Halt; Line open, station closed
