= Stroud railway station =

Railway station in Gloucestershire, England

Stroud
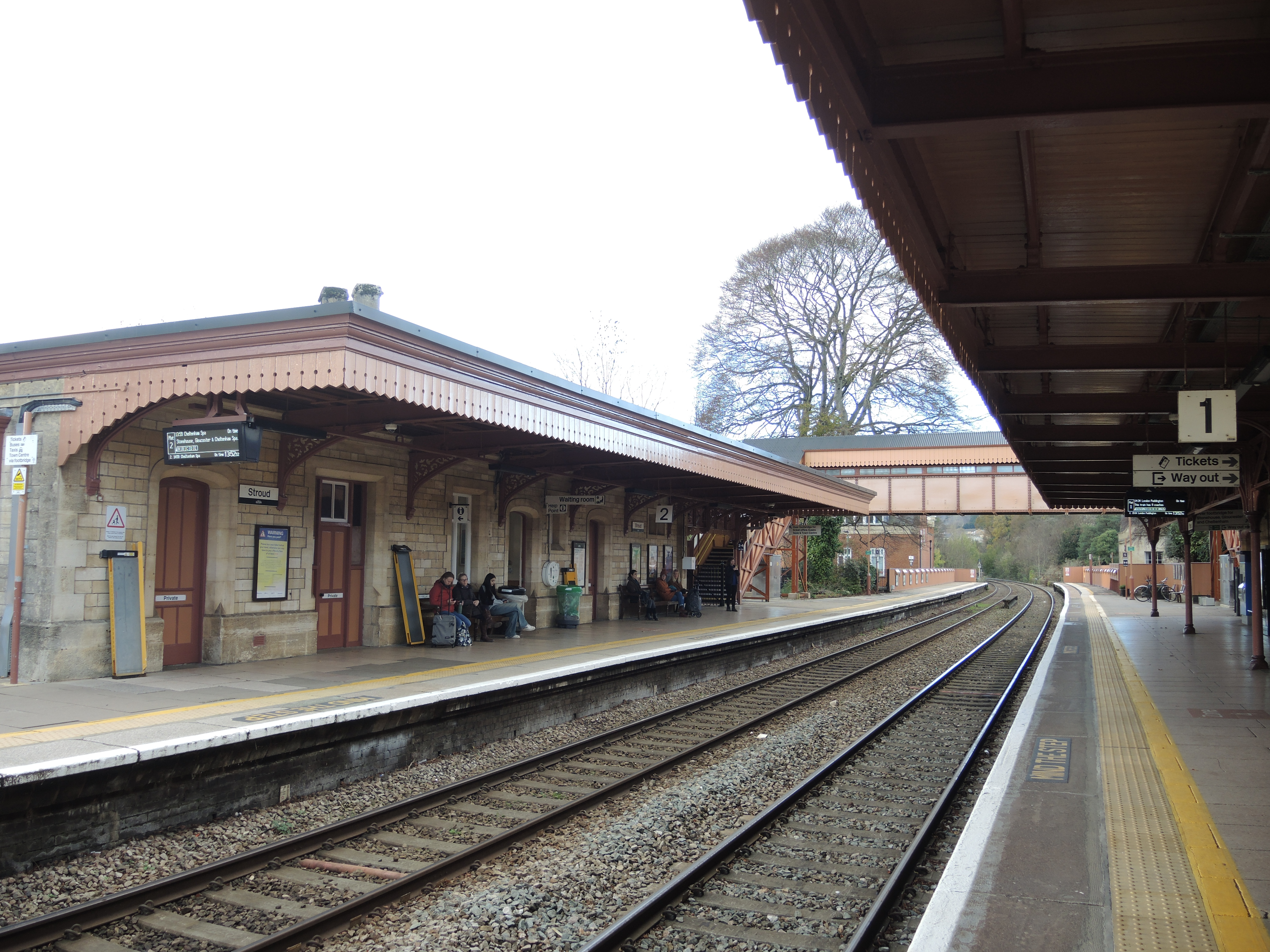
- Looking towards Stonehouse in 2025

General information
- Location: Stroud, Stroud District; England
- Coordinates: 51.745°N 2.219°W
- Grid reference: SO849051
- Manager: Great Western Railway
- Platforms: 2

Other information
- Station code: STD
- Classification: DfT category D

History
- Original company: Cheltenham and Great Western Union Railway
- Pre-grouping: Great Western Railway
- Post-grouping: Great Western Railway

Key dates
- 1845: Opened

Passengers
- 2021/22: ▲0.447 million
- 2022/23: ▲0.545 million
- 2023/24: ▲0.583 million
- 2024/25: ▲0.655 million
- 2025/26: ▲0.685 million
Location
Notes
- Passenger statistics from the Office of Rail and Road

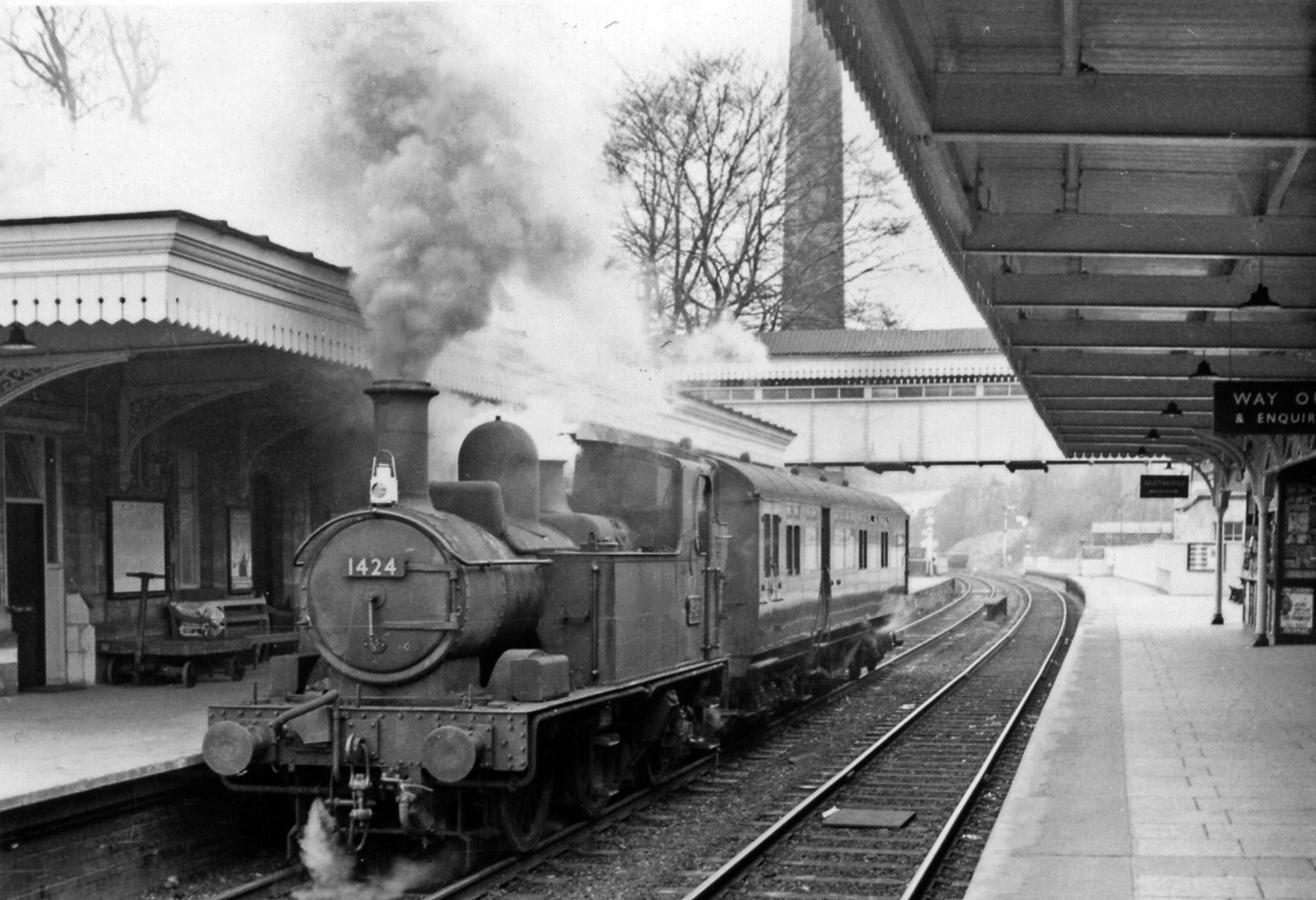
Chalford–Gloucester auto-train at Stroud station in 1962

Stroud railway station serves the market town of Stroud in Gloucestershire, England. It is a stop on the Gloucester–Swindon Golden Valley Line and was designed by Isambard Kingdom Brunel. It is located 102 miles 13 chains (164.4 km) west of London Paddington.

== History ==
The station was opened on 12 May 1845 with the opening of the Kemble to Gloucester section of the Cheltenham and Great Western Union Railway, later part of the Great Western Railway. For a period between 1886 and 1947, when Stroud had two passenger railway stations, it was known as Stroud Great Western, Stroud Russell Street or Stroud Central. Stroud's second station, Stroud Wallbridge, was the terminus of a short branch line from the Midland Railway's Stonehouse and Nailsworth Railway, and freight services were always more important there than passengers.

In 1905, the Great Western Railway inaugurated a motor bus service between Stroud and Painswick, similar to systems in operation at other places such as Penzance and Slough. The services were operated by Mills Daimler vehicles with 22hp petrol engines, capable of carrying 22 passengers. The journey time was around 30 minutes.

=== Stationmasters ===
- Mr. Taylor, ca. 1854
- William John Hamilton Notter, 1858–1862
- John Parkinson, 1862–1866 (formerly station master at Cirencester, afterwards station master at Cirencester)
- Thomas Smith, 1866–1869 (formerly station master at Cirencester, afterwards goods agent at Hereford)
- John Robert Ward, 1869–1876
- Lawrence Henry Nolan, 1876–1897
- Richard Roberts, 1897–1909 (formerly station master at Ledbury)
- George Libby, 1909–1915 (formerly station master at Warwick)
- W.P. Roberts, 1915–1916 (formerly station master at Ross on Wye, afterwards station master at Gloucester)
- T. Cobourne, 1916–1919 (afterwards station master at Cheltenham)
- W.H. Reed, 1919–1925
- A.M. Taylor, 1925–1926 (formerly station master at Melksham)
- Mr. Mason, ca. 1926
- C.W. Wilson, ca. 1930–1936
- George Edwin Howell, 1936–1942 (formerly station master at Abergavenny)
- W.J. Hough, 1943–ca. 1950 (formerly station master at Kington)

== Description ==
Stroud station has two platforms and is served by Great Western Railway. The station has a ticket office, located on the Swindon-bound platform, with limited opening times Monday to Saturday and closed on Sundays. There is a ticket machine operating 24 hours on the same platform.

== Services ==
Great Western Railway operates services from London Paddington to Gloucester and Cheltenham using Class 800 trains, and limited local services from Swindon to Gloucester and Cheltenham using the former Class 165 two-carriage sets. Trains call hourly each way Monday to Saturday, with some additional weekday business peak services. On Sundays, there is an hourly service between Swindon and Cheltenham Spa, with 3 services a day onwards to Paddington.

Preceding station	National Rail	Following station
Stonehouse	Great Western Railway; London/Swindon - Cheltenham	Kemble
Stonehouse	Great Western Railway; Cheltenham-Westbury	Kemble
	Historical railways	
Downfield Crossing Halt; Line open, station closed	Great Western Railway; Cheltenham and Great Western Union Railway	Bowbridge Crossing Halt; Line open, station closed
