= Cheltenham and Great Western Union Railway =

Railway company in England

The Cheltenham and Great Western Union Railway was a railway company intended to link Cheltenham, Gloucester and Swindon, in England. It was authorised in 1836 but it found it very hard to raise money for the construction, and it opened only a part of its line, between Swindon and Cirencester, in 1841. It sold its business to the Great Western Railway, which quickly built the line through to Gloucester in 1845 and Cheltenham in 1847; part of that route was shared with other companies.

From 1903 the route introduced railmotors, small self-powered coaches, that enabled the opening of numerous low-cost passenger stopping places.

The Cirencester branch (as it had become) closed in 1964 but most of the 1845 network is still in use as a main passenger line between Swindon and Gloucester.

== Gloucester and Cheltenham Railway ==
The first railway in the Cheltenham area was the Gloucester and Cheltenham Railway, authorised by the Gloucester and Cheltenham Railway Act 1809 (49 Geo. 3. c. xxiii). It was operated as a horse-operated plateway of 3 ft 6 in (1,067 mm) gauge, chiefly intended to bring building stone down from quarries at Leckhampton, and to carry coal and other supplies from the docks then under construction at Gloucester. Cheltenham was growing in importance due to the supposed healthy qualities of the waters, which encouraged well-to-do residents to settle there. The line opened in 1811.

== Great Western Railway ==
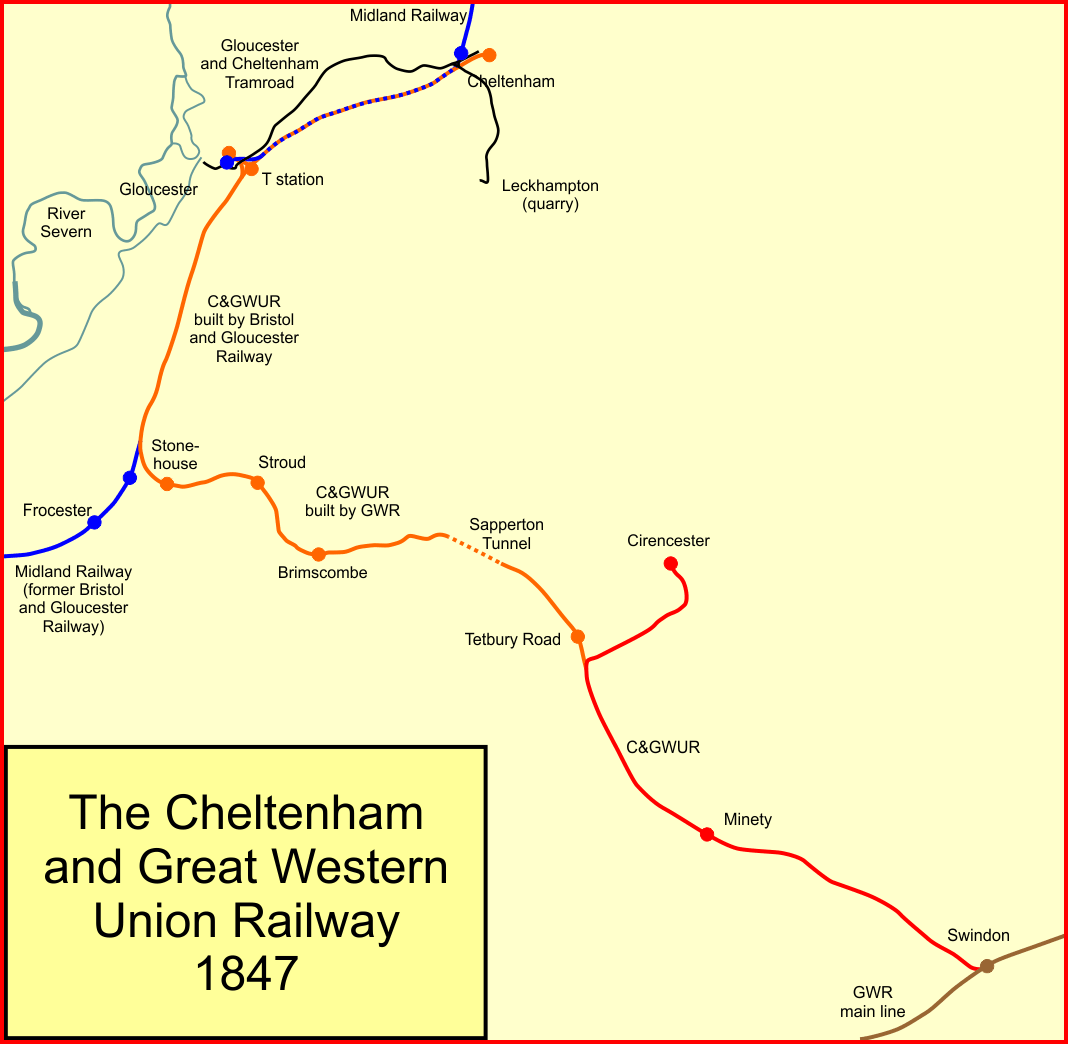
The Cheltenham and Great Western Union Railway

In 1835 the Great Western Railway was incorporated, to build a trunk railway from London to Bristol. The engineer was Isambard Kingdom Brunel and the line was to be built on the broad gauge and it would use locomotive power. It opened through Swindon on 17 December 1840, although at first there was no Swindon station.

== Birmingham and Gloucester Railway ==
Birmingham promoters could see that if they could build a railway from their city to Gloucester, onward river-borne transport would connect with Bristol, at the time an important port serving the transatlantic trade. They were successful in promoting the Birmingham and Gloucester Railway, which obtained its authorising act of Parliament, the Birmingham and Gloucester Railway Act 1836 (6 & 7 Will. 4. c. xiv), on 22 April 1836.

== Cheltenham and Great Western Union Railway authorised ==
Even before the Great Western Railway had been authorised, people in Cheltenham had determined to promote a line from Cheltenham through Gloucester and Stroud to join the planned Great Western Railway near Swindon; they appointed Isambard Kingdom Brunel as their engineer, and he advised that a suitable line could be built. Enthusiasm was weak in Gloucester, which was already connected to Bristol by water, and which was planning expansion to its docks. The cost of construction of the line would be £750,000.

Cheltenham and Great Western Union Railway Act 1836
- Act of Parliament
- Parliament of the United Kingdom
- Long title: An Act for making a Railway from Cheltenham and from Gloucester, to join the Great Western Railway near Swindon, to be called "The Cheltenham and Great Western Union Railway," with a Branch to Cirencester.
- Citation: 6 & 7 Will. 4. c. lxxvii

Dates
- Royal assent: 21 June 1836

Text of statute as originally enacted

Accordingly they submitted a bill for the Cheltenham and Great Western Union Railway in the 1836 session of Parliament. It was passed on 21 June 1836 as the Cheltenham and Great Western Union Railway Act 1836 (6 & 7 Will. 4. c. lxxvii), with authorised capital of £750,000. It is likely that stationary steam engines were intended to work the steepest gradient near Sapperton Tunnel.

The line was from Cheltenham, and from Gloucester, joining just east of there, to Swindon, with a branch to Cirencester. The proposed alignment of the C&GWUR and the Birmingham and Gloucester Railway was almost identical between Gloucester and Cheltenham, and the two companies, being authorised in the same session of Parliament, agreed a collaborative arrangement. The C&GWUR was to make the half of the line between Gloucester and Cheltenham that was nearer Gloucester; the Birmingham company was to pay half the cost of construction and have sole control of the line as if they had made it themselves. They were to construct the Gloucester station, and the C&GWUR were to make the Cheltenham station, and both companies could use both stations.

The C&GWUR was destined to be 7 ft 1/4 in (2,140 mm) broad gauge, and the Cheltenham to Gloucester line was to be built on the narrow (4 ft 8 1/2 in or 1,435 mm standard gauge), but the C&GWUR could lay additional rails for their broad gauge trains, at their own expense. The C&GWUR were obliged to complete their portion near Gloucester in time for the Birmingham and Gloucester Railway's opening. Both companies shared the Gloucester and Cheltenham Tramway, already purchased for £35,000 by the Birmingham and Gloucester company; as a plateway its route was unsuitable for use as a main line railway but its advantage was the access it had created to Gloucester Docks.

Squire Gordon of Kemble, near Cirencester, made considerable objection to the railway and had to be bought off with a substantial cash sum in compensation. Moreover he insisted that the railway should pass through his land in a tunnel, and no public station was to be built in his lands.

== Construction ==
Cheltenham and Great Western Union Railway Act 1838
- Act of Parliament
- Parliament of the United Kingdom
- Long title: An Act to alter the Line of the Cheltenham and Great Western Union Railway, and to amend the Act relating thereto.
- Citation: 1 & 2 Vict. c. xxiv

Dates
- Royal assent: 11 June 1838

Text of statute as originally enacted

Contracts for construction were let in May 1837, and some investigatory work was done for the Sapperton Tunnel, but in November 1837 the C&GWUR reported that the condition of the money market was such that they were going to be unable to build all of their line in the foreseeable future. Accordingly they proposed to concentrate on the section between Swindon and Cirencester, which had the best chance of bringing in income. The Birmingham and Gloucester Railway were alarmed by this as they relied on the C&GWUR to build part of the shared Gloucester to Cheltenham line. The C&GWUR needed an act of Parliament, the Cheltenham and Great Western Union Railway Act 1838 (1 & 2 Vict. c. xxiv), passed on 11 June 1838, for an extension of time, and the Birmingham company secured clauses in it enabling them to build the relevant portion themselves if the C&GWUR did not proceed with the construction in a timely way. The act also authorised two independent stations at Gloucester, and it was later agreed to make separate stations at Cheltenham as well. The alignment through Sapperton Tunnel was substantially changed in the act, substituting two tunnels for the earlier long one, which would have been curved throughout its length.

The C&GWUR decided to alter its priorities, and it let contracts for construction and acquired land at Gloucester for the station. Some work was done but the state of the money market was so difficult that in November 1839 the Directors decided that they could not carry out any significant work at Gloucester, and they invited the Birmingham and Gloucester Railway to do the work it required in accordance with the earlier act.

Another railway, the Bristol and Gloucester Railway, had been authorised on 1 July 1839. It relied on use of the C&GWUR between Standish, near Stonehouse, and Gloucester. In the new situation, it was in the same position as the Birmingham company, and together they agreed to purchase the C&GWUR, together promoting a bill for the purpose in the 1840 session of Parliament. However the two companies found that a mutually acceptable negotiated position was unachievable, and the scheme was dropped.

Instead, the Birmingham company decided to take over the Cheltenham to Gloucester construction itself, according to the 1838 powers. They took possession of the works on 18 June 1840, while they opened their own line between Birmingham and Cheltenham on 24 June 1840.

Construction now was straightforward, and the line between Cheltenham and Gloucester was opened on 4 November 1841 as part of the Birmingham and Gloucester Railway.

Meanwhile the C&GWUR had managed to construct its southern portion from Swindon to Cirencester; it was double track as far as the intended junction at Kemble and then single. It opened on 31 May 1841. The line was operated on a short term lease basis by the Great Western Railway. The stations were at Purton, Minety and Cirencester.

== Sale to the Great Western Railway ==
Cheltenham and Great Western Union Railway Act 1842
- Act of Parliament
- Parliament of the United Kingdom
- Long title: An Act to amend Two Acts relating to the Cheltenham and Great Western Union Railway.
- Citation: 5 & 6 Vict. c. xxviii

Dates
- Royal assent: 13 May 1842

Text of statute as originally enacted

The C&GWUR Board had become exhausted by the struggle to get this far and in 1842 they obtained the Cheltenham and Great Western Union Railway Act 1842 (5 & 6 Vict. c. xxviii), authorising sale or lease of their line to the Great Western Railway, or to the Bristol and Gloucester Railway or the Birmingham and Gloucester Railway. In addition £750,000 of supplementary capital was allowed, with three years extension to the allowed period of construction.

The Birmingham and Gloucester Railway was "enjoined" to lay broad gauge rails between Gloucester and Cheltenham, and the Bristol and Gloucester Railway was empowered to construct the Standish to Gloucester section itself; this included the laying of narrow (standard) gauge rails as the Bristol Company still intended construction of its own line on that basis.

Negotiations were quickly opened with the GWR for a sale to them, but they delayed agreeing for some time; however in January 1843 they agreed to purchase, including taking over all the powers and liabilities of the C&GWUR. The transfer took place on 1 July 1843, and the GWR expended £230,000 of capital; the C&GWUR had expended more than £600,000 to get to this stage. Sanction for the sale was obtained by the Great Western Railway Act 1844 (7 & 8 Vict. c. iii), which also authorised an extension at Cheltenham from the Lansdown station to a more central location at St James Square.

== Construction from Kemble to Gloucester ==
The GWR proceeded urgently with construction from Kemble to Gloucester; the power to buy back the C&GWUR half of the Gloucester to Cheltenham line depended on completion to Gloucester by 21 June 1845, and the Bristol and Gloucester railway had been promised that Standish to Gloucester would be available to them by April 1844. In fact it was 8 July 1844 when the Standish to Gloucester section was ready, constructed by the Bristol company itself. The main section included Sapperton Tunnel, 1,855 yards (1,696 m) in length; the shorter tunnel was 353 yards (323 m) long.

In the section from the tunnel to Stroud there were nine timber viaducts. General Pasley, in making an inspection for the Board of Trade, enumerated them as follows:

- Frampton, twelve 30-foot (9.14 m) spans;
- Slip, twenty-two 30-foot (9.14 m) spans;
- St Mary's, one skew span of 75 feet (22.86 m) over a canal;
- Bourne, seventeen spans including one of 67 feet (20.42 m) on the skew over the canal;
- Capel's, eighteen 30-foot (9.14 m) spans;
- Canal, four spans including one of 51 feet (15.54 m) over the canal;
- Watt's, eight 30-foot (9.14 m) spans;
- Stratford, eight spans including one of 40 feet (12.19 m);
- Cainscross, four spans of 32 feet (9.75 m).

Lewis records that there were nineteen timber structures (that is, viaducts and ordinary overbridges and underbridges) on the line, all of them in the Stroud Valley. The last recorded reconstruction was of Capel's and Canal viaducts (forming a single structure) at 101m 60c in 1892.

Stations were at Tetbury Road, Brimscombe, Stroud and Stonehouse. At Gloucester the C&GWUR used a platform on the north side of the Birmingham and Gloucester Railway's station; this was already in use by the Bristol and Gloucester Railway. The line into it crossed the Birmingham line at the mouth of the station area. The line opened on 12 May 1845.

== Between Gloucester and Cheltenham ==
Although some construction had been undertaken towards the extension from Lansdown Road to St James in Cheltenham, the GWR now delayed further construction there, because of the possibility of making an alternative route to the town, which would have required a different alignment. This plan was later put to one side, so in 1847 the GWR announced its intention to start using the line to Cheltenham. Broad gauge railways were already in place and the Cheltenham station almost completed.

Captain Simmons of the Board of Trade inspected the line, the first important instance of a mixed gauge railway, (Note: The Bristol and Gloucester Railway had made the first instance between Mangotsfield and Westerleigh, when it opened its broad gauge line while retaining the 4 ft 8 in (1,422 mm) gauge tram road of the former Bristol and Gloucestershire Railway to Coalpit Heath.) and reported on 15 October 1847. The inspection included the newly constructed Avoiding Line, forming the third side of a triangle at Gloucester.

The station arrangements at Gloucester will remain the same... but the broad gauge to Cheltenham unites with the narrow gauge immediately outside the Station, the Down line to Cheltenham being laid with three rails throughout up to the point of separation of the gauges near that town, the Up line being laid with four rails as far as the junction with the Avoiding Line, from which point to the point of separation near Cheltenham it is likewise laid with three rails...

The combination of the gauges, where three rails have been used for both, has been effected by laying an additional rail outside each line of the narrow gauge, as if the latter had never been disturbed.

GWR trains started running to their station in St James Square, Cheltenham on 23 October 1847. At Gloucester there was a new broad gauge station on the Avoiding Line, where a direct line from the Gloucester station intersected it; there was a turntable in each running line; the station came to be known as the T station.

As soon as the T station was ready, Swindon trains ran direct to Cheltenham calling at the T station, and a shuttle service to the main station was run from there; through vehicles to Gloucester were transferred using the turntable. This system continued in use until in September 1851 the line westward from Gloucester towards Grange Court was opened. From that time the Avoiding Line and the T station fell out of use. When the GWR acquired the C&GWUR's rights in 1845 they took ownership of the whole line between Gloucester and Cheltenham, although the half nearer Gloucester was held by them as trustees for the Birmingham and Gloucester Railway.

== Gauge conversion ==
By the early 1870s it had become obvious to the GWR Board that conversion of the broad gauge to narrow (standard) gauge was inevitable. The South Wales lines were converted in the first half of May 1872, and the line between Gloucester and Swindon was altered between 23 May 1872 until 26 May 1872, from which date only narrow gauge trains operated, on a temporary single line; the line was fully operational from 29 May 1872.

== Tetbury branch ==
Tetbury was an important market town, and in 1872 a public meeting there agreed that a branch railway was necessary. It took some time to bring this to a definite scheme: it was authorised by Parliament on 7 August 1884, and opened on 2 December 1889. The junction station was at Kemble on the C&GWUR line, already the junction for Cirencester.

Kemble had been an exchange station only (between the Cirencester branch and the main line) without public access. In 1872 it was made public for the first time. The line needed to cross the lands of Anna Gordon, no doubt the heiress of Squire Gordon who had been so hostile to the railway at the outset. Maggs says that she objected to the Tetbury branch merely making a junction at an exchange station, and that accommodating this would involve forming a new junction station some distance from the Kemble junction for Cirencester. This was unacceptable to the GWR, and after negotiation it was agreed to make Kemble a public station and to make the junction for the Tetbury branch there. (Kemble was made a public station in 1872 and construction of the Tetbury branch was not started until 1887.)

== Standish Junction ==
From the opening of the C&GWUR there was a conventional broad gauge junction at Standish, where the Bristol and Gloucester Railway converged. That company was taken over by the Midland Railway and it opened an independent narrow (standard) gauge line to Gloucester on 19 May 1854, and from that date there was no connection between the lines there. When the GWR abolished the broad gauge in the Gloucester area, a junction was made once again, operative from 21 April 1873, allowing GWR trains approaching from Gloucester to run on to the Midland Railway towards Bristol in exercise of running powers. This was closed in 1887.

On 25 July 1908 the junction was reopened, enabling GWR trains from Birmingham via Honeybourne to get access to the Bristol line. The crossovers were arranged to connect from southbound GWR from Gloucester towards Bristol, and from Bristol to northbound GWR. On 26 October 1964 the converse crossovers were commissioned, enabling trains from the Stroud direction to run to the former Midland Railway northbound track and vice versa. The purpose of this was to enable London to Cheltenham trains to use Eastgate station at Gloucester, avoiding reversal which would have been necessary using the GWR Central station.

From 8 September 1968 the line between Standish and Gloucester was reduced to two tracks only, and the junction reverted to being an ordinary double junction.

== Steam railmotors ==
In 1902, Thomas Nevin made application to construct light railways – in effect street passenger tramways – from Cheltenham to Gloucester, Stroud and Chalford. There was relatively dense population in a narrow strip adjacent to the valley floor which the main line railway followed, and the widely spaced stations of the former C&GWUR line had long been the subject of complaint. Recent experience had shown the GWR that passenger tramways could quickly abstract much of the income from local passenger trains. Nevin's application was refused, but the GWR noted that road omnibus competition was already significant and frequent, while their own daily passenger service between Stonehouse and Chalford consisted of only five trains one way and six the other.

The line occupation was intensive, chiefly due to mineral trains and returning bank engines, until the opening of the South Wales and Bristol Direct Railway (informally referred to as the Badminton line) on 1 July 1903. Many mineral trains from South Wales running by way of Gloucester were diverted through the Severn Tunnel and the Badminton line, significantly reducing line occupation between Standish Junction and Swindon.

The London and South Western Railway and the London, Brighton and South Coast Railway had together constructed a steam railmotor, in which a small steam engine was integrated into a single passenger coach. It could be driven from either end, and this arrangement was considered ideal for a frequent shuttle operation, as it avoided the delay of running round at the end of each trip. The south coast railways intended to use it on the East Southsea branch.

The GWR were allowed to borrow the vehicle over the weekend of 9 and 10 May 1903, and it operated from Swindon to Stonehouse. Although it attracted considerable local attention, it was not suitable for the longer journey and the steep gradients of the Stroud line, losing steam pressure, and therefore speed, on the journey.

The GWR had been developing their own design alternatives for some time; a petrol version had been favoured in April 1903, as it might save the cost of a fireman. However at the end of that month three steam vehicles were authorised, and a demonstration run was made on 9 October 1903, with public service starting on 12 October. The vehicles had retractable steps to allow passengers to board and alight at ground-level stopping places; some of these were simply level crossings. An hourly service for six days a week was put on. Tickets were issued on the railmotor, "on the tramway principle". Lighting in the vehicles was by gas, although there was electric communication between the driver and the "conductor".

The railmotors became very popular, and a difficulty was that their limited accommodation could not be strengthened at busy times. In 1905 the GWR introduced a parallel omnibus service for three months to relieve overcrowding. Adding a trailer to the railmotor was impracticable on this route as the railmotor did not have sufficient power to keep time on the steep gradients.

The railmotors were progressively converted to trailers and used with conventional small locomotives fitted with push and pull apparatus, and the service was extended to run from Chalford to Gloucester. The last true railmotor ceased running on the line in July 1928.

== Diesel railcars ==
The first diesel railcar on the main line started running in April 1936; it was a GWR vehicle, no 15, which ran outwards from Cheltenham over the Midland and South Western Junction Railway to Marlborough and returned over the C&GWUR main line. The service was not popular and was withdrawn in September 1936.

From 2 February 1959, four-wheel diesel railbuses started operating between Cirencester and Kemble (and also on the Tetbury branch), but they were not permitted to operate in passenger service on the main line, as their light weight meant that they did not operate track circuits reliably. A new halt at Chesterton Lane, near Cirencester, was opened for the service, and later another was opened at Park Leaze.

== Since 1948 ==
On 1 January 1948, in common with most of the railways of Great Britain, the line was taken into national ownership, under British Railways.

The introduction of diesel railbuses on the Cirencester branch with a more intensive service had led to increased loadings, but the branch was still considered uneconomic, and it was closed to passengers on 6 April 1964. Goods services were withdrawn from October 1965. The Tetbury branch closed to passengers on 6 April 1964; the goods service on that branch had been discontinued on 5 August 1963.

The line between Swindon and Kemble was singled on 28 July 1968.

From 8 September 1968, the line between Standish Junction and Tuffley Junction was reduced to two tracks.

The former Midland Railway station at Gloucester Eastgate was closed from 1 December 1975, and all passenger trains used Gloucester Central station. The existing down platform was lengthened to 1,600 feet to enable double-banking of trains, and the up platform was relegated to parcels use only. It was brought back into use in 1984 as platform 4.

The Swindon to Kemble section, that had been reduced to single track in 1968, was returned to double track configuration on 2 September 2013.

== Topography ==
=== Gradients ===
The summit of the line was in Sapperton Tunnel, approached from the south by a long climb from Oaksey Halt. At first at 1 in 330 it stiffened in the final two miles to 1 in 94. The approach from the north was more difficult, climbing at 1 in 330 to 1 in 276 from Standish, then 1 in 250 from Stroud, and 1 in 75 and 1 in 60 for over three miles from St Mary's Crossing Halt.

=== Location list ===
- Swindon; station on Bristol main line;
- Purton; opened 31 May 1841; closed 2 November 1964;
- Minety; opened 31 May 1841; renamed Minety and Ashton Keynes 1905; closed 2 November 1964;
- Oaksey Halt; opened 18 February 1929; closed 2 November 1964;
- Kemble; opened for exchange purposes 12 May 1845; open to public 1 May 1872; still open;
- Tetbury Road; opened 12 May 1845; goods only from 1 May 1882; renamed Coates goods 1 May 1908; closed 1 July 1963;
- Sapperton Short Tunnel, 352 yards;
- Sapperton Long Tunnel; 1,864 yards;
- Chalford; opened 2 August 1897; closed 2 November 1964;
- St Mary's Crossing Halt; opened 12 October 1903; closed 2 November 1964;
- Brimscombe; opened 1 June 1845; closed 2 November 1964; earliest spelling was Brimscomb;
- Brimscombe Bridge Halt; opened 1 February 1904; closed 2 November 1964;
- Ham Mill Crossing; opened 12 October 1903; renamed Ham Mill Halt 1957; closed 2 November 1964;
- Bowbridge Crossing Halt; opened 1 May 1905; closed 2 November 1964;
- Stroud; opened 12 May 1845; still open;
- Downfield Crossing Halt; opened 12 October 1903; closed 2 November 1964;
- Cashes Green Halt; opened 22 January 1930; closed 2 November 1964;
- Ebley Crossing Halt; opened 12 October 1903; closed 2 November 1964;
- Stonehouse; opened 1 June 1845; renamed Stonehouse Burdett Road 1951; renamed Stonehouse 1968; still open;
- Standish Junction;
- Millstream Junction, later Gloucester South Junction;
- Tramway Junction;
- Gloucester; Bristol and Gloucester Railway use from 8 July 1844; GWR started use from 12 May 1845; GWR station opened 9 September 1851; renamed Gloucester Central 1951; combined with Eastgate station 26 May 1968 and renamed Gloucester; still open.
- Gloucester South Junction; above;
- T station; opened 23 October 1847; closed 19 September 1851;
- Engine Shed Junction; later Barnwood Junction;
- Churchdown; opened 2 February 1874; closed 2 November 1964;
- Hatherley Junction; divergence of line to Banbury;
- Lansdown Junction; convergence of line from Banbury; divergence of Midland Railway towards Ashchurch;
- Cheltenham Malvern Road; opened 30 March 1908; closed 1 January 1917; reopened 7 July 1919; renamed Cheltenham Spa Malvern Road 1925; closed 3 January 1966;
- Malvern Road East Junction; divergence of line towards Honeybourne;
- Cheltenham; opened 23 October 1847; relocated to east 9 September 1884; renamed Cheltenham St James 1908; renamed Cheltenham Spa St James 1925; closed 3 January 1966.

Cirencester branch:

- Kemble; as above;
- Park Leaze Halt; opened 4 January 1960; closed 2 November 1964;
- Chesterton Lane Halt; opened 2 February 1959; closed 6 April 1964;
- Cirencester; opened 31 May 1841; renamed Cirencester Town 1924; closed 6 April 1964.

== See also ==
- Dual gauge
