= Golden Valley line =

Railway line in England

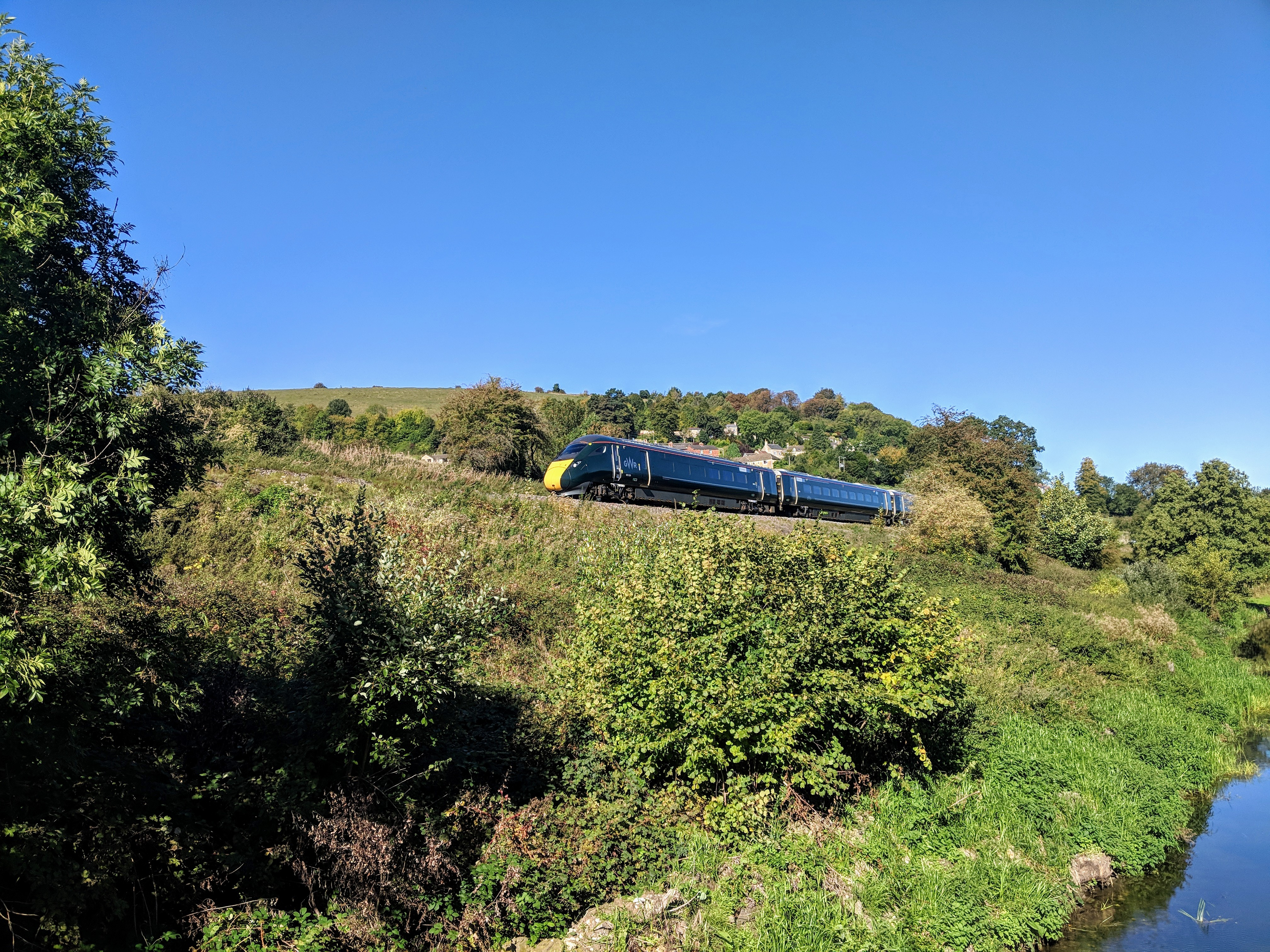
- Class 800 on the Golden Valley line

Overview
- Status: Operational
- Owner: Network Rail
- Locale: Gloucestershire and Wiltshire, South West England

Service
- Type: Heavy rail
- System: National Rail
- Operator(s): Great Western Railway
- Rolling stock: Class 800

Technical
- Number of tracks: Double track
- Track gauge: 1,435 mm (4 ft 8 1/2 in) standard gauge
- Electrification: None
- Operating speed: 100 mph (160 km/h) maximum
Route map
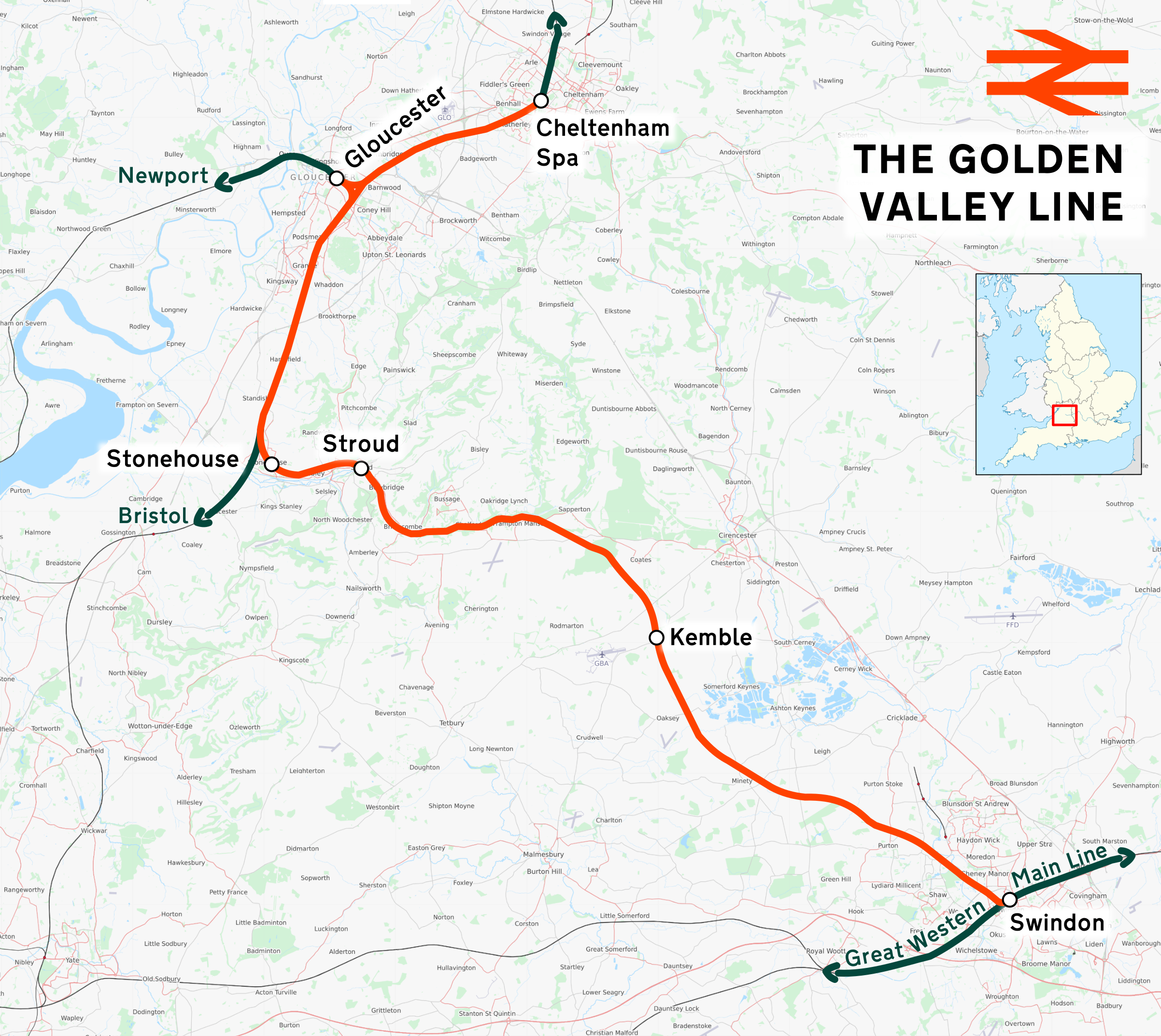
(Click to expand)

The Golden Valley line is the popular name for the railway line connecting Swindon, Gloucester, and Cheltenham Spa in England. Originally constructed as the Cheltenham and Great Western Union Railway, the line opened between Swindon and Kemble (with a branch to Cirencester) in 1841; it took an additional four years to complete the remaining sections.

The line diverges from the Great Western Main Line at Swindon, passes through the Sapperton tunnel, and descends the Golden Valley to Stroud. At Standish Junction, just north of Stonehouse, it merges with the main line running between Bristol Temple Meads and Birmingham New Street.

== Origin of name ==
The "Golden Valley" refers to a section of the valley of the River Frome located between Chalford and Stroud, which the railway line follows for part of its route. It is said that the name was coined by Queen Alexandra, wife of King Edward VII, while travelling on a train along this route in June 1909. Since then, the name has become associated with the entire line from Swindon to Gloucester and Cheltenham, as these are the endpoints of the shortest train services along the line.

== Places served ==
The towns served by the route are:

- Swindon
- Kemble
- Stroud
- Stonehouse
- Gloucester (through trains must reverse, or omit calling here)
- Cheltenham

The other intermediate stations and halts were closed to passengers on 2 November 1964. Kemble station was a junction for two branch lines serving Cirencester and Tetbury; both branches closed to passengers on 6 April 1964 and their tracks were subsequently lifted.

== Services ==
Passenger services between Paddington and Cheltenham are operated by Great Western Railway. Services run approximately hourly. There are limited services between Swindon and Cheltenham Spa on Mondays to Saturdays. The maximum speed on the line is 100 mph (160 km/h).

== Electrification proposal ==
In 1977, the Parliamentary Select Committee on Nationalised Industries recommended the electrification of more of Britain’s rail network. By 1979, BR presented a range of options to achieve this by 2000. These options included electrifying various former Great Western routes, such as the Golden Valley line. However, under the Conservative governments from 1979 to 1990, which succeeded the Labour government of 1976–1979, the proposal was not implemented.

== Reinstatement of second track ==
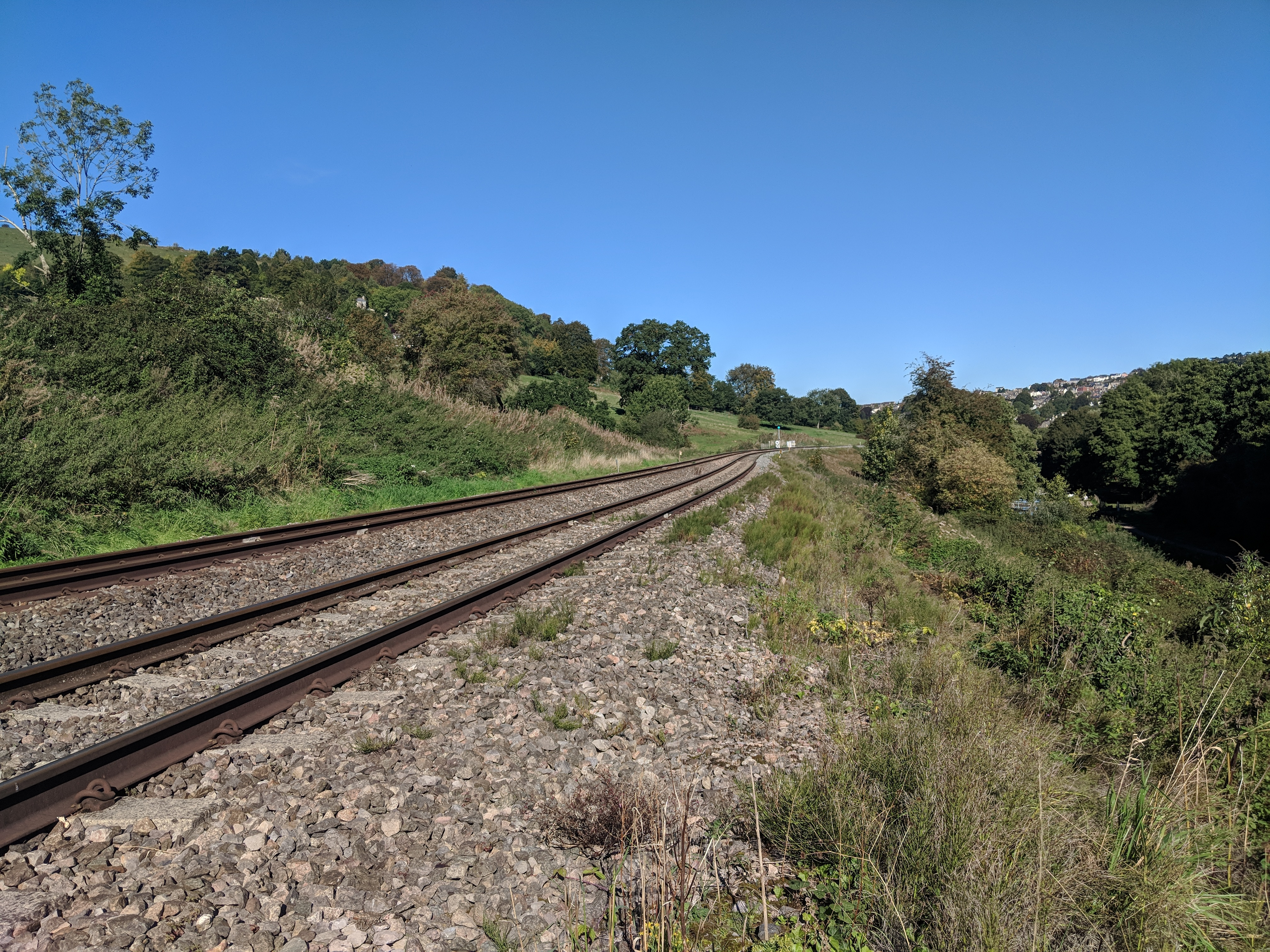
Looking towards Stroud

The line was originally built as a double track, but in 1968, it was reduced to a single track between Swindon and Kemble as a cost-saving measure. It was initially intended that the entire section between Swindon and Standish Junction would be single track, with passing places at Kemble and Sapperton; however, protests led British Rail to abandon the project after reaching Kemble.

Network Rail proposed reinstating the second track in September 2008 and then again in September 2009, but the plans were referred to the Office of Rail Regulation (ORR). Despite protests by local MPs, the ORR made a preliminary decision that the project would not be included in the 2009–2014 High Level Output Specification plan for new rail infrastructure. In the 2011 Budget, the Government announced that funding for the redoubling would be provided, with works initially scheduled for completion by Spring 2014 but later delayed until August 2014.

Initial work involved slewing the single track, which had been moved to the centre of the trackbed during the singling works. This was followed by excavation, clearance, and the installation of the new track. Level crossing works were also undertaken. The line was officially reopened by Anne, Princess Royal in October 2014.

The redoubling was an important step in the 21st Century upgrade of the Great Western Main Line, as it provides a diversionary route for trains between London and Cardiff when the Severn Tunnel is closed or during electrification works between Swindon and Severn Tunnel Junction.

== See also ==
- Cheltenham and Great Western Union Railway – provides additional details about the earlier stations on this line.
- Thames and Severn Canal – runs alongside the railway line and is visible from the train, especially between Stroud and Kemble.

== Sources ==
- Anonymous (Winter 1979). Railway Electrification. British Railways Board (Central Publicity Unit). pp. 0–2, 8.
