= Bristol Harbour Railway =

Former English railway (1872 to 1964)

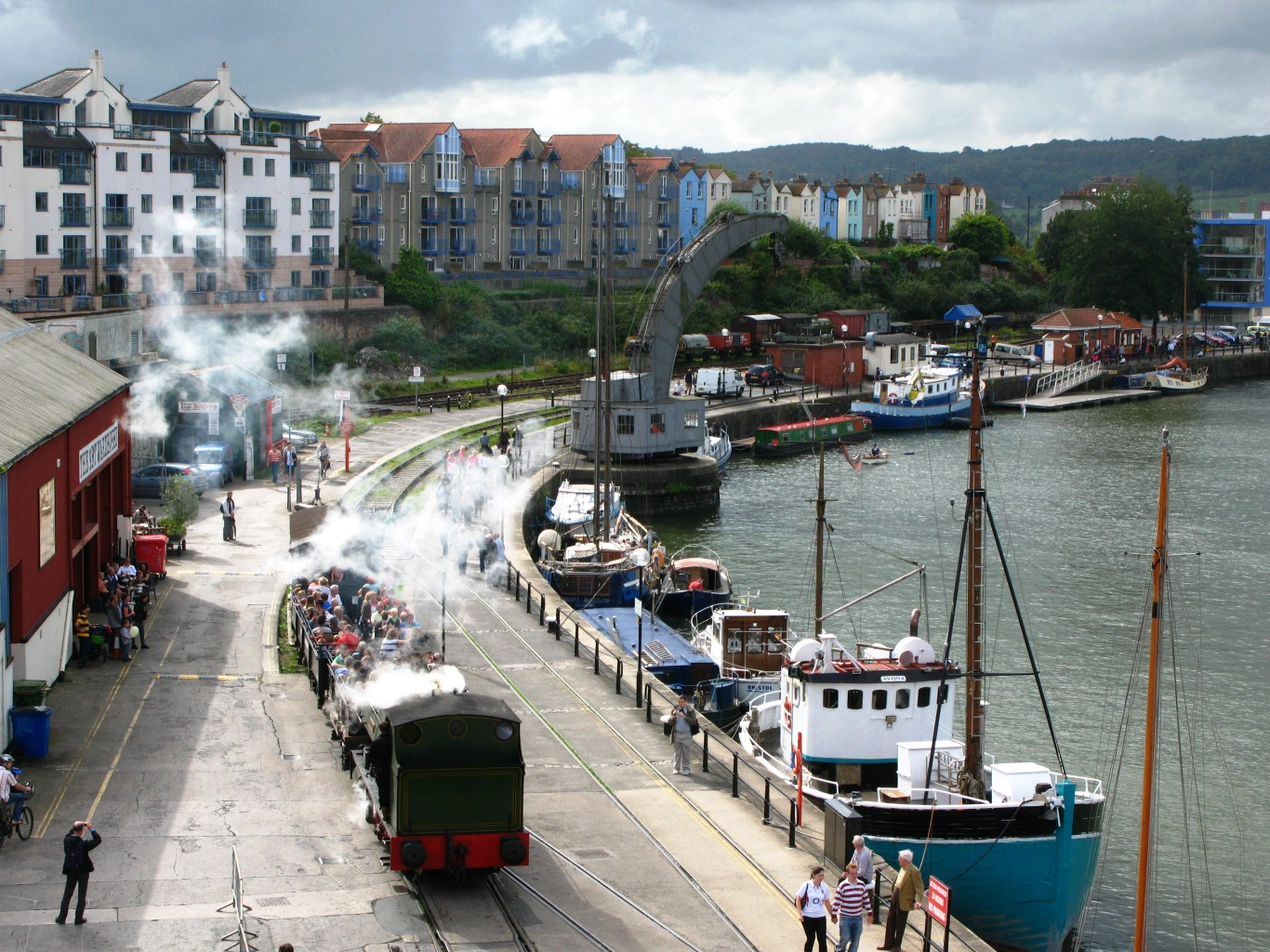
- Henbury pulls a train near the Fairbairn steam crane
- Locale: Bristol
- Terminus: Prince's Wharf

Commercial operations
- Built by: Great Western Railway
- Original gauge: 4 ft 8 1/2 in (1,435 mm) standard gauge

Preserved operations
- Stations: 3
- Preserved gauge: 4 ft 8 1/2 in (1,435 mm) standard gauge

Commercial history
- Opened: 1872 and 1906
- Closed: 1987

The Bristol Harbour Railway (known originally as the Harbour Railway) was a standard-gauge industrial railway that served the wharves and docks of Bristol, England. The line, which had a network of approximately 5 mi (8.0 km) of track, connected the Floating Harbour to the GWR mainline at Bristol Temple Meads. Freight could be transported directly by wagons to Paddington Station in London. The railway officially closed in 1964.

In 1978, a heritage railway named the Bristol Harbour Railway was opened and operated by Bristol Industrial Museum. It uses approximately 1 mile (1.6 km) of the preserved line that runs adjacent to the River Avon. The line is a very popular visitor attraction in the city.

== Industrial line ==
Bristol Harbour Railway Act 1869
- Act of Parliament
- Parliament of the United Kingdom
- Long title: An Act to confer further powers upon the Great Western and the Bristol and Exeter Railway Companies with respect to the Bristol Harbour Railway and Depôt, and for other purposes.
- Citation: 32 & 33 Vict. c. lxiii

Dates
- Royal assent: 24 June 1869

Text of statute as originally enacted

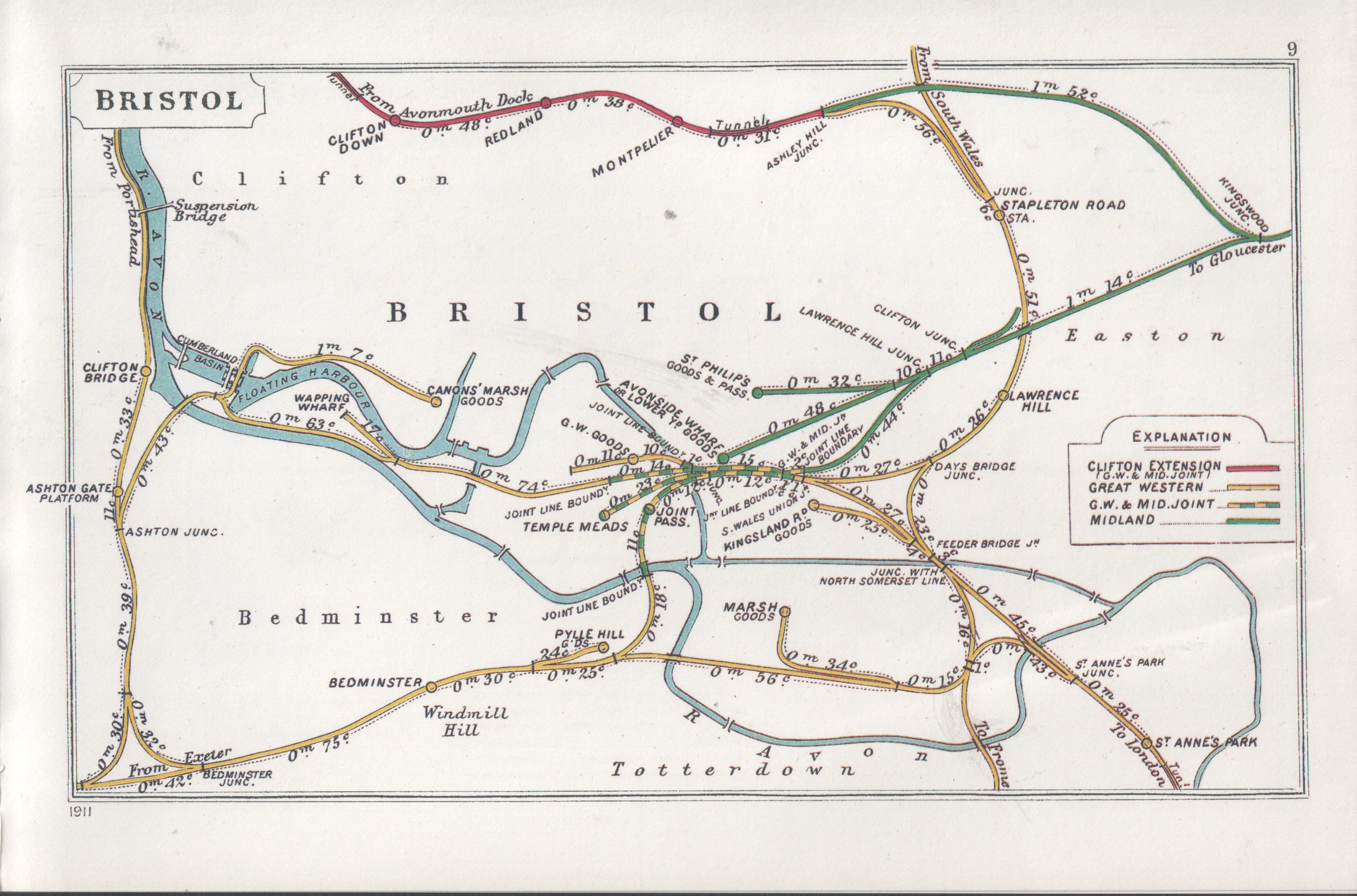
The Harbour Railway on a 1911 Bristol railway map

The Bristol Harbour Railway was a joint venture by the GWR and sister company the Bristol and Exeter Railway. Authorised by the Bristol Harbour Railway Act 1869 (32 & 33 Vict. c. lxiii), the first part of the network opened in 1872 between Temple Meads and the Floating Harbour. The route required a tunnel under St Mary Redcliffe church and a steam-powered bascule bridge across the entrance locks at Bathurst Basin. In 1876 the line was extended by 1/2 mile (0.80 km) to Wapping Wharf.

The Bristol Dock Act 1897 (60 & 61 Vict. c. ciii) gave the GWR the authorisation to make a westwards connection between the Bristol Harbour Railway and the Portishead Railway. This created the West Loop at Ashton Gate which permitted southerly travel towards Taunton and Exeter St Davids. The connection also permitted the double the rail capacity to the Great Western Main Line.

In 1906 another authorised extension created new branches from the south via the Ashton Swing Bridge to Canons Marsh on the north side of the Floating Harbour and to Wapping via a line alongside the New Cut.

In 1964, the Harbour railway connection to Temple Meads was closed and the track lifted. The steam engine from the link's bascule bridge is now preserved at Bristol Museum & Art Gallery. The following year, the Canons Marsh line closed. The branch from the Portishead line and Wapping marshalling yard to the Western Fuel Company continued remained open for commercial coal traffic for another 20 years. It was officially closed in 1987.

== Heritage railway ==
In 1978, the Bristol Industrial Museum reopened part of the line as preserved railway using locomotives built in Bristol and formerly used at Avonmouth Docks. At first, it connected the museum with the SS Great Britain, but when commercial rail traffic ceased in 1987 on the remaining branch line, the museum railway expanded to use the branch alongside the New Cut. However, when the Portishead Railway was relaid, this severed the connection to Ashton Junction.

The line starts at M shed, following the south side of the harbour and crossing Spike Island, the narrow strip of land between the harbour and the River Avon. The former route east over the Swing Bridge is now the Pill Pathway rail trail and cycleway.

The railway operates on selected weekends on standard gauge track over 1 1/2 miles (2.4 km). The railway runs along the south side of Bristol Harbour, starting at M Shed (the former Bristol Industrial Museum (51.4483°N 2.5969°W)), stopping at the SS Great Britain, and ending at B Bond Warehouse (home of the CREATE Centre), one of the large tobacco warehouses beside Cumberland Basin (51.4466°N 2.6213°W).

In 2006, Bristol Industrial Museum was closed and the site redeveloped into M Shed Museum of Bristol. The railway continues to operate between SS Great Britain Halt (but no longer to the CREATE Centre), and in 2011 the railway became part of M Shed's working exhibits.

In 2010, Bristol City Council, in partnership with other local councils in the area, proposed that the route of the railway should be used for a bus rapid transit route to serve the south-west of the city. A review of alternative routes in 2013 recommended a route along Cumberland Road, Commercial Road and Redcliff Hill as the best alternative. This change of route means that the rapid transit buses would no longer use the railway. The track and platform at Butterfly Junction (by the CREATE Centre) was removed before March 2017 due to work on the Bristol MetroBus system.

The route to the CREATE Centre was further curtailed in December by severe subsidence that closed that section of the line and the adjacent Chocolate Path. The section collapsed into the New Cut in January 2020. Since the collapse, trains from the M Shed now travel a significantly shorter route that follows Museum Street, ending at a platform near to the SS Great Britain.

=== Rolling stock ===
| Number and name | Built | Description | Current status | Livery | Image |
|---|---|---|---|---|---|
| 242 | 1874 | Fox, Walker and Company 0-6-0ST | Stored unrestored | | |
| 1764 Portbury | 1917 | Avonside Engine Company 0-6-0ST | undergoing overhaul. | IW&D grey and black | |
| 1940 Henbury | 1937 | Peckett and Sons 0-6-0ST | Operational | PBA Green | |
| 418792 | 1959 | Ruston & Hornsby 0-4-0DM Seabank Gas Works (Avonmouth) shunter | Needs Repairs following vandalism | Green | |

The steam locomotives were formerly part of the aborted preservation scheme at Radstock North. There is also a collection of wagons, some of which have been converted for passenger use while others are used for demonstration goods trains.

== Sources ==
- New page for M Shed Museum "M Shed Working Exhibits". Official M Shed Website.
- Old version of the museum's web page, now located at "Bristol's Industrial Museum". Bristol City Council: leisure and culture.
- Unofficial behind the scenes blog on Bristol Harbour Railway "BHR Blog". Bristol Harbour Railway Blog.
