= Fairbairn steam crane =

Crane design with a curved jib

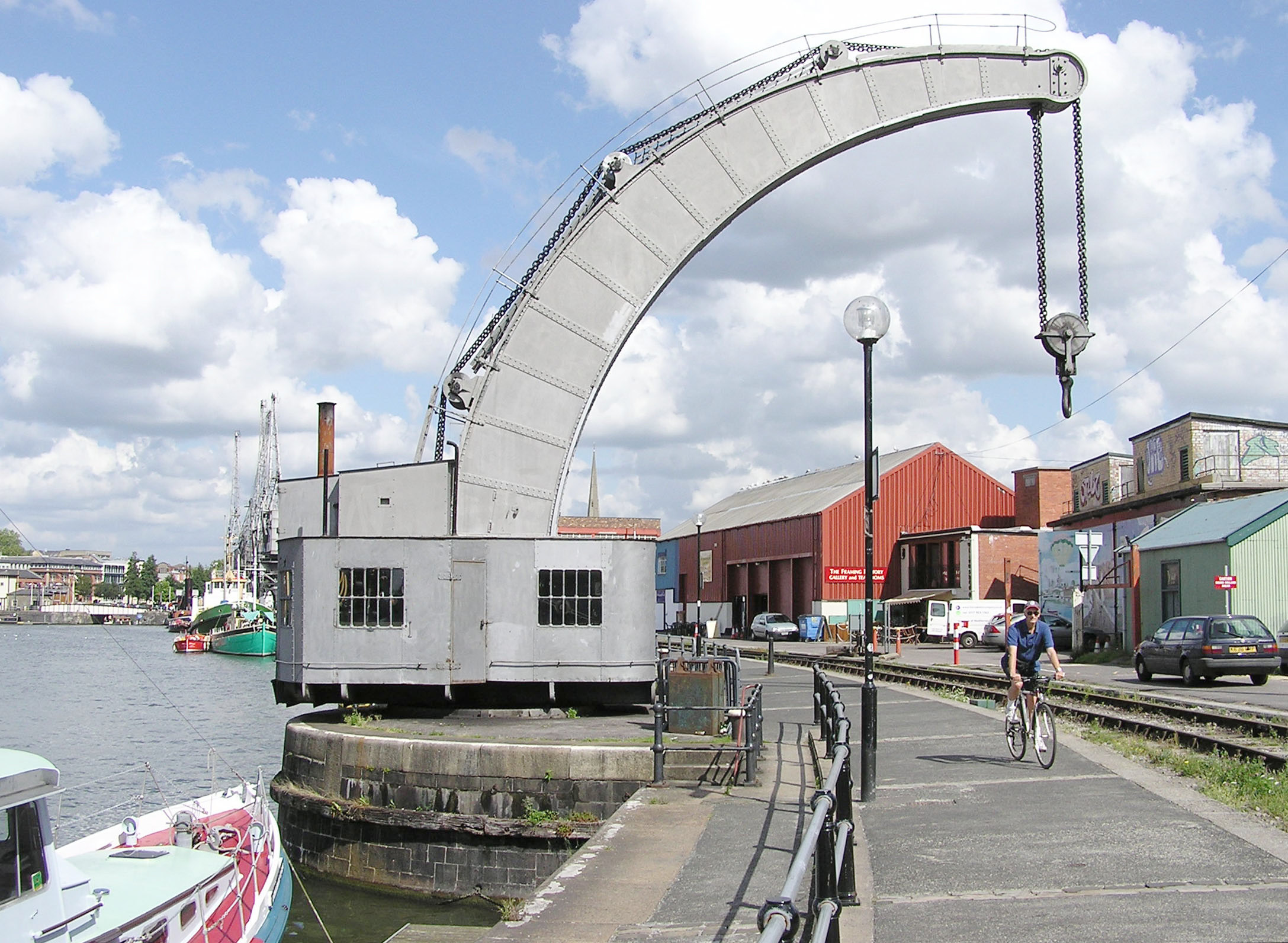
The Fairbairn steam crane at Bristol Harbour, England

A Fairbairn crane is a type of crane of an 'improved design', patented in 1850 by Sir William Fairbairn. There are numerous hand-powered versions around the world and one surviving steam-powered example in Bristol Docks, England.

== Innovative design ==
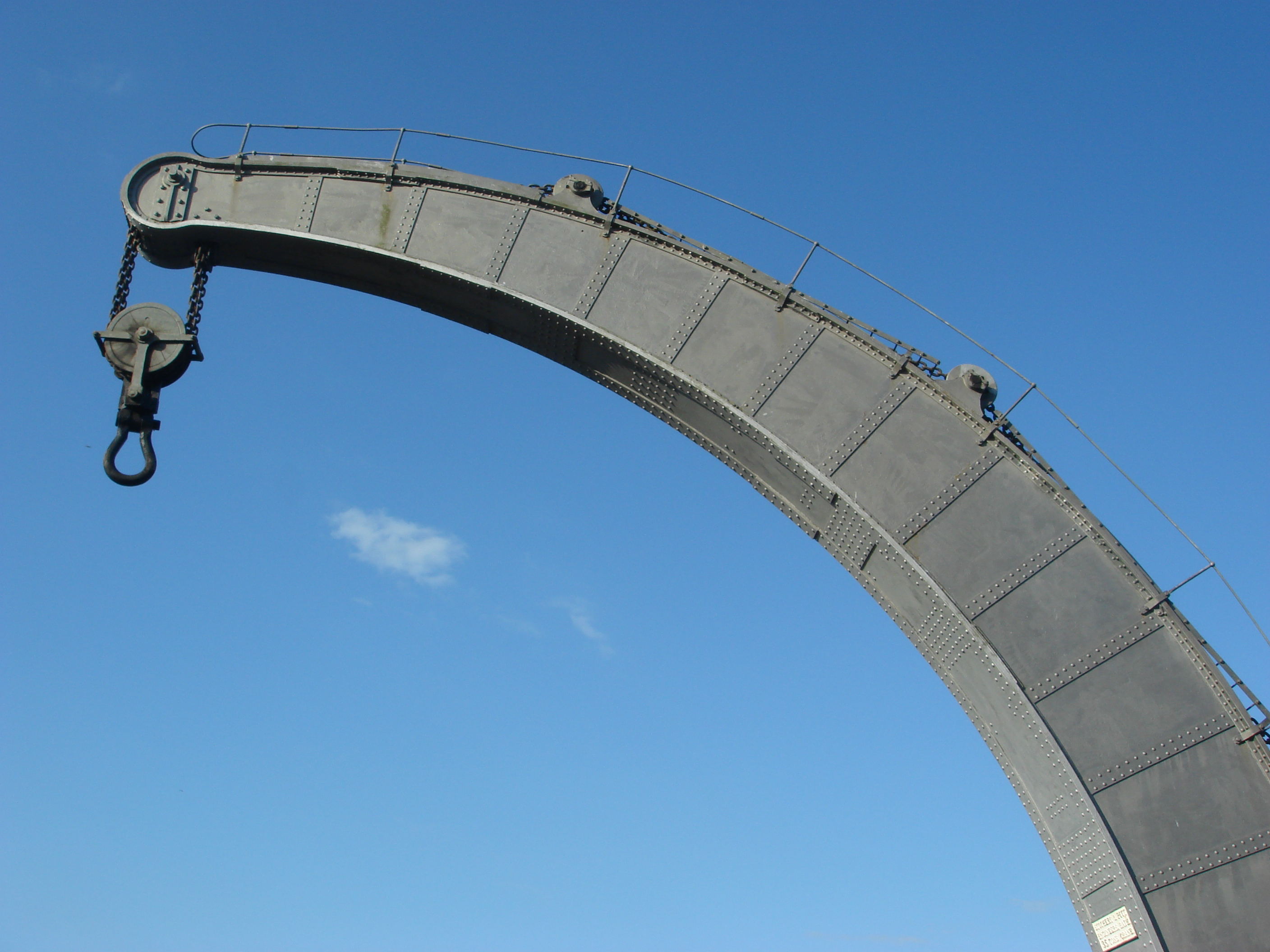
Fairbairn's patent curved platework jib

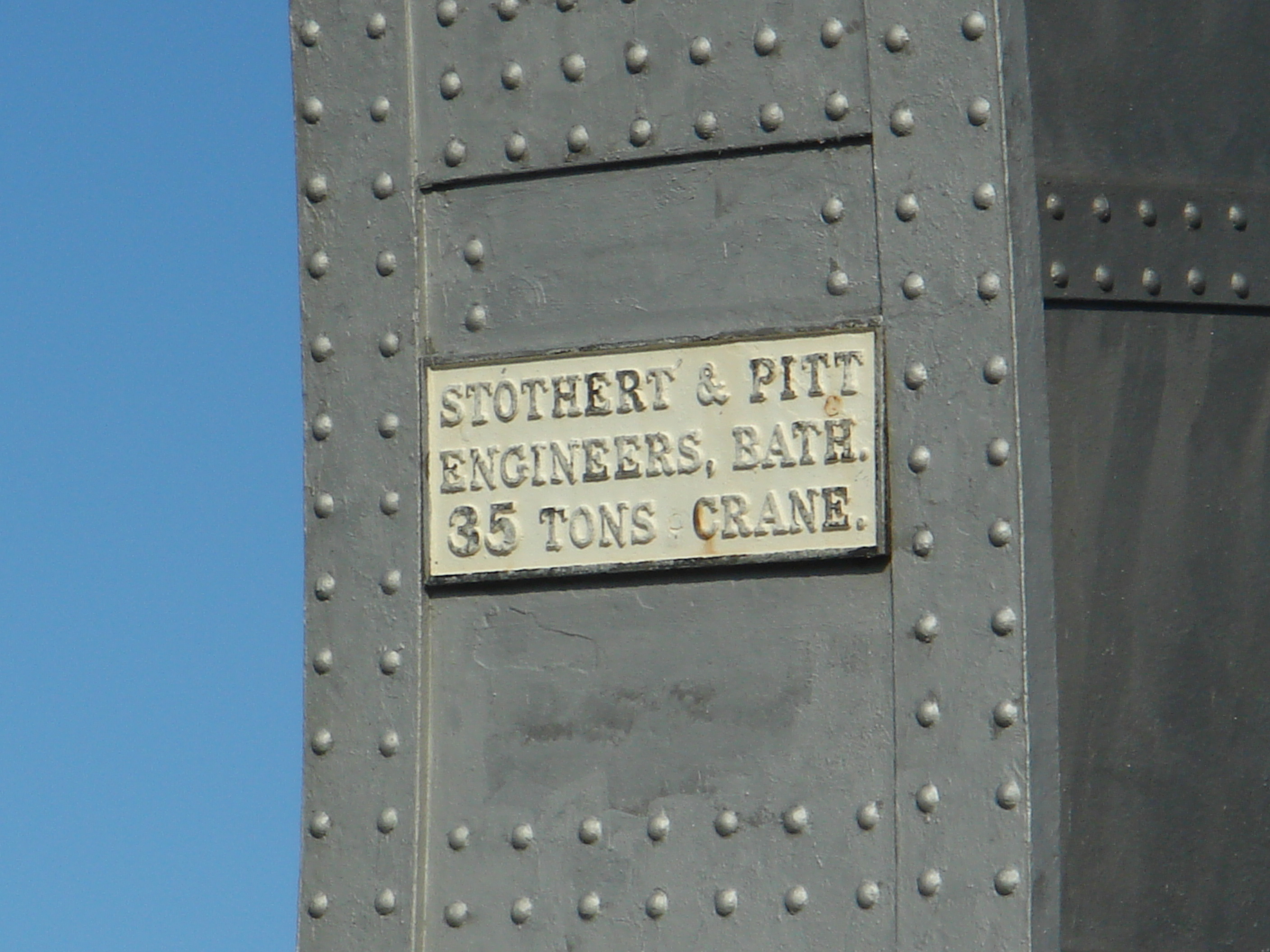
Maker's plate for Stothert & Pitt. This photograph also shows the distinctive double rows of rivets that make up 'chain riveting.'

The crane's innovation was in the use of a curved jib, made of riveted wrought iron platework to form a square-section box girder. This curved jib could reach further into the hold of a ship, clear of the deep gunwales alongside the quay.

Designing a strong curved jib required Fairbairn's advanced theoretical understanding of the mechanics of a box girder. The tension forces were carried by the outer, convex surface of the girder which was made of back plates being chain-riveted together. The inner surface carried a compressive load. To avoid plate crumpling, it was made as a cellular structure: an inner plate and webs formed three rectangular cells, effectively box girders in their own right. The character of a box girder is to resist torsional twisting, so a composite face built up of them is also good at resisting crumpling.

The first of these cranes were a batch of six built for the Admiralty at Keyham and Devonport. These were hand-operated and could lift 12 tons to a height of 30 feet (9.1 m) and a radius of 32 feet (9.8 m) . The size of the crane jibs was determined by ships of the period, and their lifting capacity by men's ability to raise the load. Experiments at Keyham with loads of up to 20 tons showed the jib design to be sound, and that the jib at least was capable of handling loads of up to 60 tons.

A "colossal" crane of 60 tons was later built at Keyham, with a cell plate stiffened by four cells. This crane was worked by four men driving through a gear train of 632 times, which must have been hard and slow work at full capacity. As the capacity of the crane was so obviously limited by its motive power, not its strength, they were an obvious candidate for steam power – as was later re-applied to the 60 ton crane at Keysham. There was even a proposal for a 120 feet (36.6 m) high crane, to replace masting sheers at Woolwich. A more typical size for most of these later cranes though would be able to lift 35 tons at a radius of 35 feet (10.7 m). They were powered by self-contained steam engines, with both boiler and engine mounted on board the crane.

William Fairbairn & Sons of Manchester built a number of these cranes and also licensed the design to other makers. After the expiry of the patent in 1875, other companies, notably Cowans Sheldon & Co of Carlisle, built many others as late as 1910, often powered by steam, water hydraulics or electricity. They were particularly favoured in naval dockyards for fitting battleship guns; Hong Kong had a battery of four.

== Bristol ==
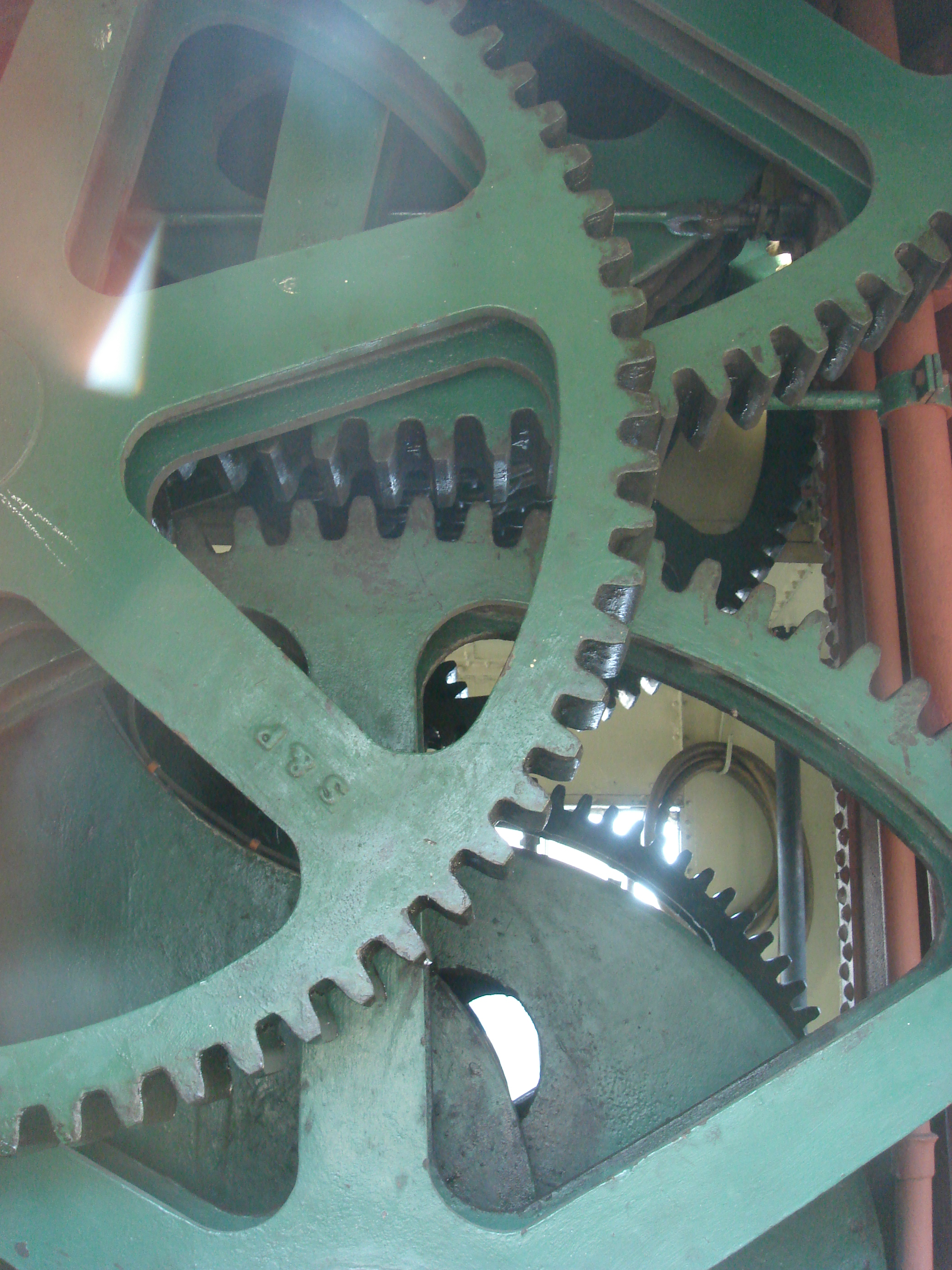
Gearing inside the cab, showing a cast-in "S&P" mark

The only surviving Fairbairn steam crane is in Bristol, on the quayside at Wapping Wharf in the Floating Harbour. It is in the care of the M Shed museum, located on the adjacent Prince's Wharf.

=== Construction ===
In the 1870s, Bristol Docks was going through a period of expansion and modernisation in the face of increasing competition from other ports. Iron-hulled ships were becoming larger, cargoes heavier, and there had already been investment in building a railway line along the harbour quay. Crane capacity was limited, though – none of the harbour's 17 cranes being able to lift more than 3 tons.

Accordingly, a more powerful steam crane was ordered, to be capable of lifting 35 tons and loading it directly onto a railway wagon. This was ordered from local makers Stothert & Pitt in 1875, although to the Fairbairn pattern. As for the later Fairbairn cranes, the original cell plate was changed to a design of a single flat plate stiffened by riveted T section ribs, rather than the original cellular structure. In August 1878 the crane had been completed and tested, at a cost of £3,600 for the machinery, plus the masonry foundations.

The jib has a radius (reach) of 35 feet (11 m) and a height of 40 feet (12 m). The crane weighs 120 tons. A vertical boiler inside the cab operates at 100 psi and supplies two twin-cylinder steam engines: one for slewing (turning) the crane, a larger one for winding the lifting chain. The winding drums can be driven by their gearing at four different speeds. The jib box girder extends below ground in a well for 25 feet (7.6 m). A plain bearing at the foot of the well carries the weight of the crane and roller bearings beneath the cab resist tipping loads. Water for the boiler is supplied by a pump, which originally drew water straight from the dock and is also used for draining the well. The boiler's maker's plate reads "Marshall Sons & Co. Ltd., Engineers, Gainsboro, England, No.92766"; it is the fourth boiler that has served the crane and was installed in 1953.

The cab of the crane is also of iron, with small-paned windows. These window frames are decorated with small roses cast into the junctions of the glazing bars. Some time around 1900 the top winding drums and gears were enclosed in a further box on the roof.

=== In service ===
Although mechanically capable, the crane was not a great success commercially. In 1890 it was only used for 16 days of the year, for a profit of just 11s. 6d. Ships had increased in size by this time and the jib could no longer reach far enough to remove engines or boilers for repair work. It was even considered raising the crane up on a stone tower, as for the smaller crane at Canons Marsh opposite, to increase the lift height.

In 1892, hydraulic machinery, including cranes, appeared in the docks. These used a powerful central power supply and could transfer cargoes more quickly. In 1906 electric cranes appeared too. The steam crane was required less and less often; for a whole year between April 1905 and April 1906 the crane went unused. From 1903 to 1909 it made a total of 143 lifts. It remained useful for heavy loads, however.

During World War II the crane's heavy capacity came into its own. A Landing Craft Flotilla Unit was stationed on Princes Wharf, and over 1000 new assault landing craft were delivered by road for adaptation for use in the Far East. The crane was used to unload the lorries and to launch the craft after completion, a total of over 2000 lifts in three years.

=== Today ===
The crane is still operational and is regularly steamed.

With the gradual closure of the City Docks, in 1973 the crane was passed to Bristol City Museum. In 1972 it was grade II* listed and it is also a scheduled monument, as the last surviving Fairbairn steam crane. From 1988, it was restored to operational condition as part of the Bristol Industrial Museum. The crane operates on special museum days, such as bank holidays and the Harbour Festival.

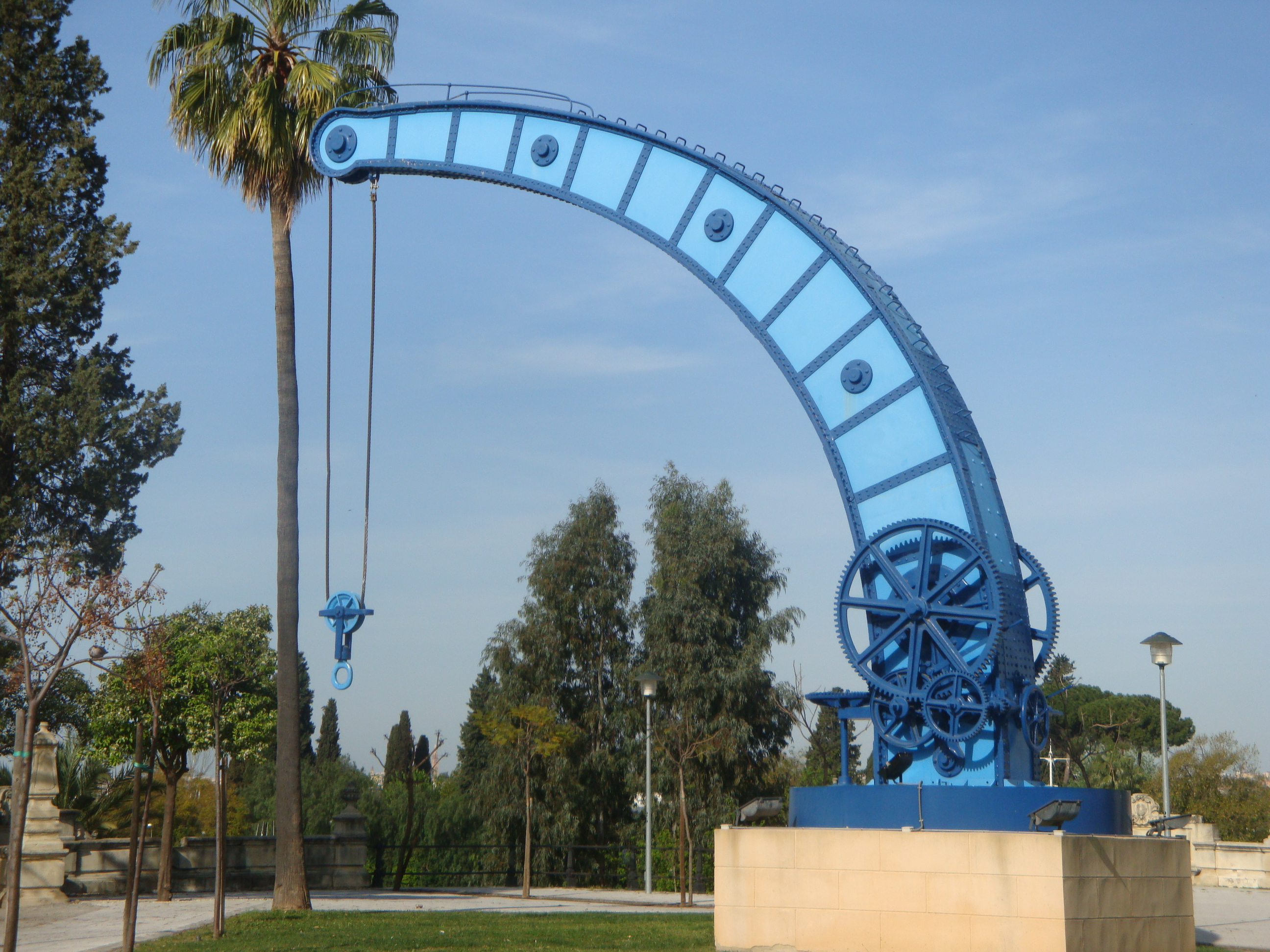
The Seville crane

== Seville ==
A hand-cranked example survives in Seville, Spain.

== Dover ==
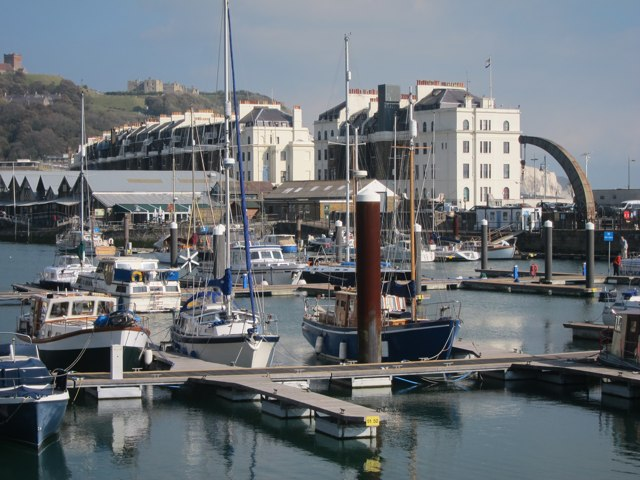
Wellington Dock in Dover, Kent, the crane to the right

Another Fairbairn crane survives at Dover, on the quayside of Wellington Dock. It is now a scheduled monument. This is a hand-cranked crane of 1868, built by the Fairbairn Engineering Company of Manchester. When originally installed it was rated at 50 tons and worked by four men. The Ordnance Department of the Royal Navy used it for handling cannon. In later years it was down-rated to 20 tons and was used for lifting yachts from what was now Dover Marina. In 2014 the crane was 'lovingly restored' and repainted, with an obtrusive vertical steel prop beneath the jib.
