= M Shed =

Museum in Bristol, England

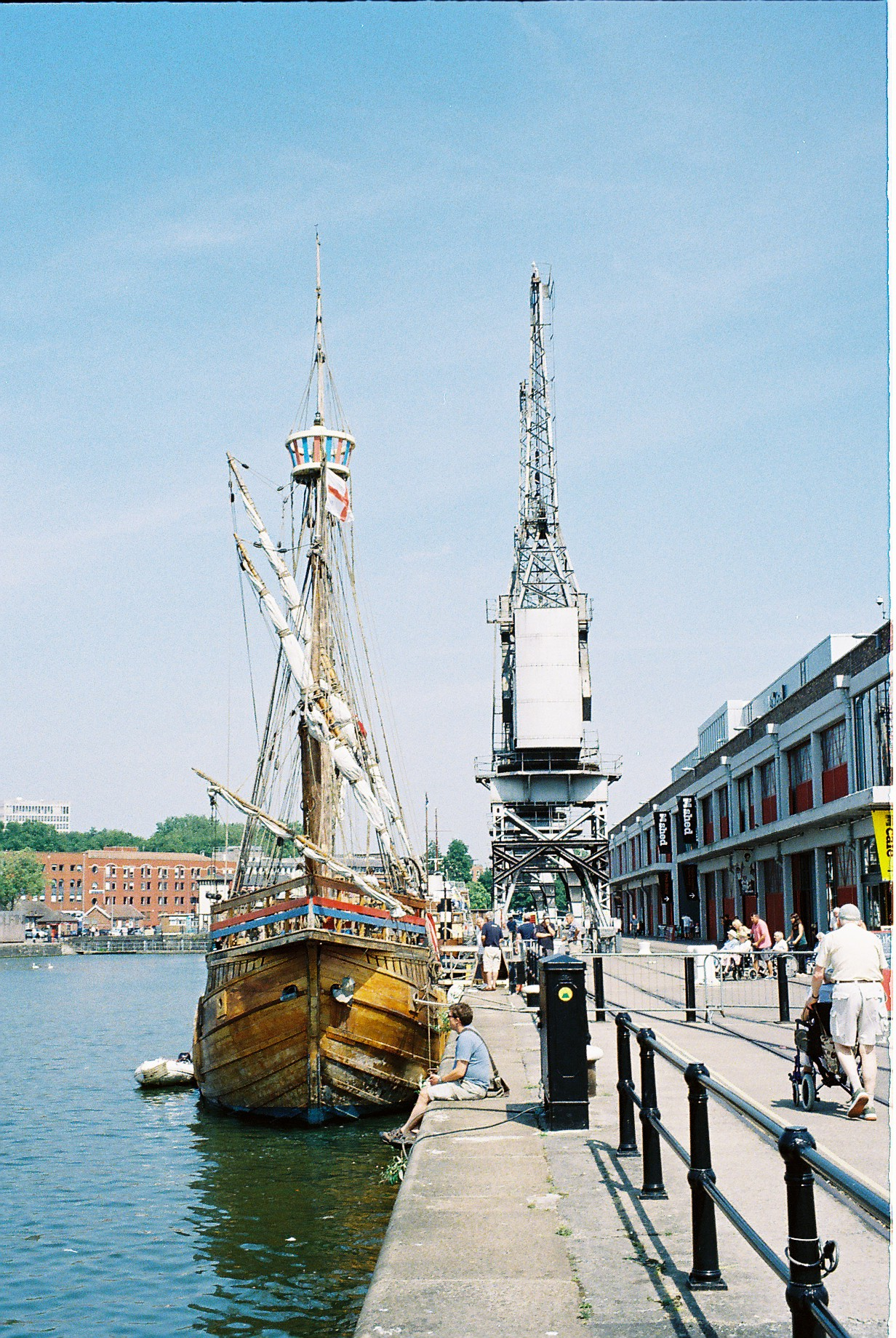

- Location within Bristol
- Established: 2011
- Location: Princes Wharf, Wapping Road, Bristol BS1 4RN, England, United Kingdom
- Coordinates: 51.4473°N 2.5986°W
- Visitors: 769,474 (2018/19)
- Website: www.bristolmuseums.org.uk/m-shed

M Shed is a museum in Bristol, England, located on Prince's Wharf beside the Floating Harbour in a dockside transit shed formerly occupied by Bristol Industrial Museum. The museum's name is derived from the way that the port identified each of its sheds. M Shed is home to displays of 3,000 artefacts and stories, showing Bristol's role in the slave trade and items on transport, people, and the arts. Admission is free.

The museum contains a shop, learning space and café.

== History ==
The Bristol Industrial Museum closed in 2006 and was transformed into the M Shed. The conversion was designed by Lab Architecture Studio. It was expected to cost £27 million including a grant of £11.3 million from the Heritage Lottery Fund. Another £1.39 million of HLF funding was announced in April 2011. The museum opened in June 2011, with exhibits exploring life and work in the city. In its first year, 700,000 people visited the new museum.

In June 2021, the defaced statue of slave trader Edward Colston, toppled in the aftermath of the George Floyd protests in 2020, went on display at M Shed to "start a city-wide conversation about its future". The campaign group Save Our Statues attempted to prevent people from visiting the exhibition by reserving all the tickets. It was unclear if the protest had any effect on visitor numbers.

== Galleries ==
There are three main galleries: Bristol Places, Bristol People and Bristol Life, each telling a story of the city, and containing a mixture of media.

Among the 3,000 exhibits of material on display are models of Nick Park's Oscar-winning animated duo Wallace and Gromit, a 10 m (33 ft) long mural by local graffiti artists, and pink spray painted record decks (1980) courtesy of Massive Attack, the trip hop trio from Bristol. The band's experimental sound would play a big part in the formation of the city's club scene in the 1980s and 1990s.

On display are newspaper clippings from the city's landmark political episodes, including a victory for the fight against racial prejudice in 1963 when a group of West Indian workers led a bus boycott after the Bristol Omnibus Company refused to recruit black workers.

A centrepiece of the galleries is a huge mural entitled Window on Bristol, painted by local artists Andy Council and Luke Palmer. It depicts Bristol's buildings in the form of a huge graffiti-esque dinosaur.

There is also a temporary gallery displaying changing exhibitions throughout the year.

The museum also contains aviation exhibits, including a Mignet HM.14, a piece of the Bristol Brabazon, a one-third scale model of a Rolls-Royce Pegasus engine, a Rolls-Royce/Snecma Olympus 593 engine and a Bristol Proteus Mk.255 engine.

== Working exhibits ==
Bristol Harbour Railway offers train rides along the quayside on selected weekends, using restored steam locomotives and rolling stock.

Moored in front of the museum is the collection of historic vessels, which include the 1934 fireboat Pyronaut and two tugs: John King built as a diesel tug in 1935, and Mayflower, the world's oldest surviving steam tug and the oldest Bristol-built ship afloat, built in 1861.

On the quayside outside the museum are four electrically powered cargo cranes built in 1951 by Stothert & Pitt. Three of these cranes are operational and operate some weekends. A short distance to the west on Wapping Wharf is a much older crane, the sole surviving operational example of a Fairbairn steam crane. Built in 1878, also by Stothert & Pitt, it was in regular use until 1973, loading and unloading ships and railway wagons with loads up to 35 tons. It has been restored and is in working order, operating on some bank holidays and during the Bristol Harbour Festival.

Whilst not owned or operated by M-Shed, the replica caravel The Matthew (a replica of the ship that crossed the Atlantic with John Cabot in 1497) is normally moored outside the museum.

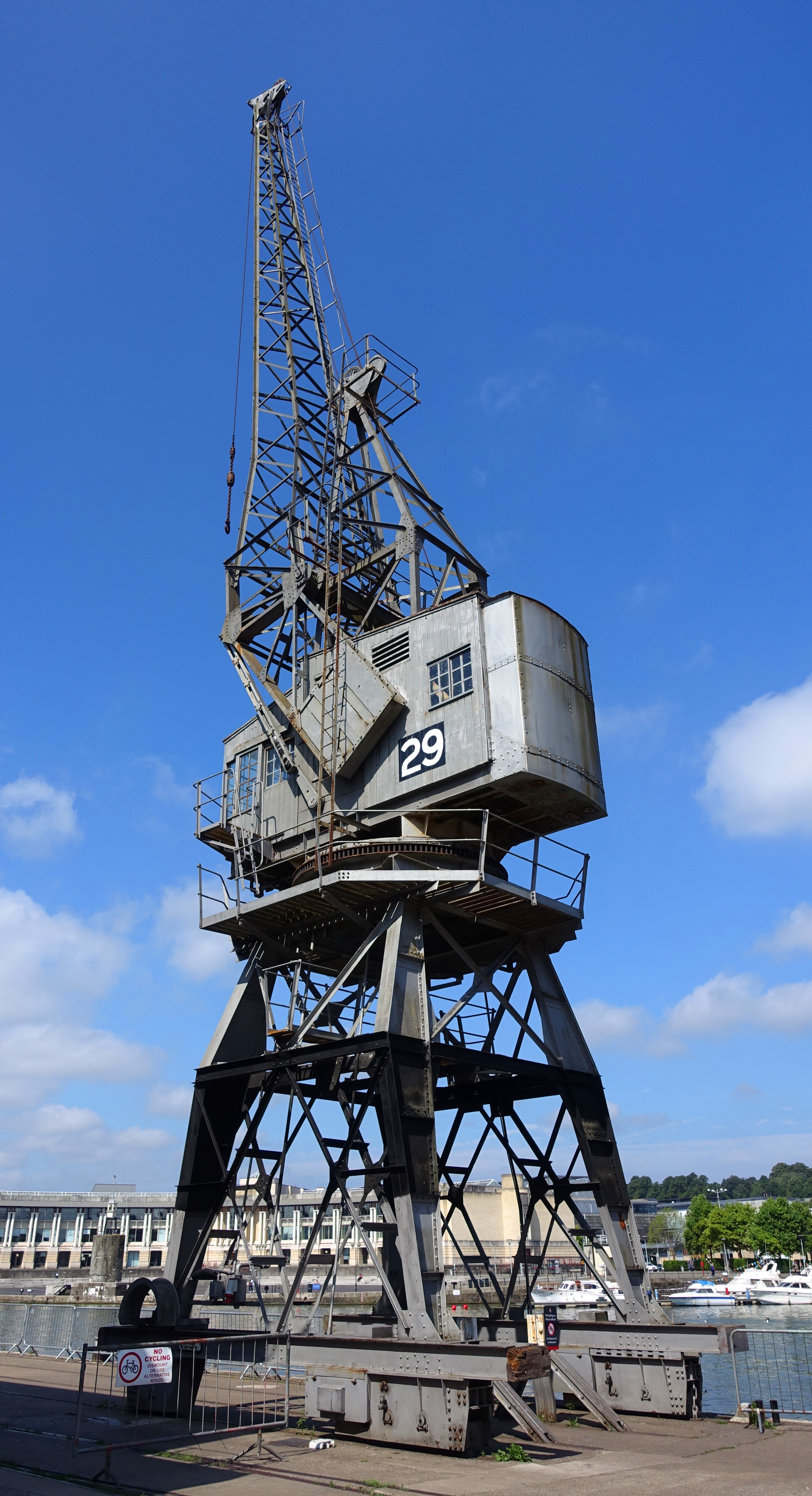
Dock crane outside M Shed
