= Rubery Owen =

British engineering company

Rubery Owen is a British engineering company which was founded in 1884 in Darlaston, West Midlands.

== History ==
In 1884 the company was started by John Tunner Rubery (1849–1920) and his two brothers (Samuel 1844–1910 and Thomas William 1856–1925), as an ironworks manufacturing gates and fences. In 1893 trained engineer Alfred Ernest Owen joined John Rubery, replacing his two brothers, and in 1903 the company name of Rubery Owen was established.

When John Rubery retired in 1910, the partnership was bought out by Owen and by 1912 the company had expanded into aviation engineering, motor frames and roofing, in addition to fencing manufacture.

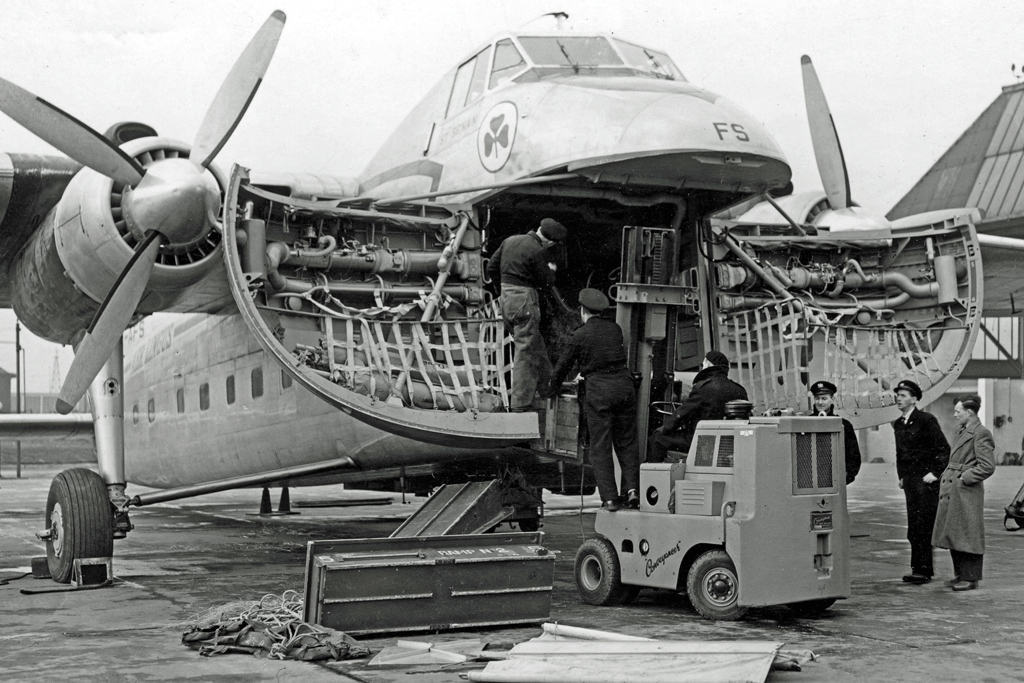
Warrington-built Conveyancer fork lift truck loading a Bristol 170 Freighter aircraft at Manchester Airport in 1952

The company expanded during the 1920s and 1930s to include the production of metal airframes, metal storage equipment, steel pulleys and armour plate. They also acquired a Warrington hydraulic company Conveyancer Fork Trucks Ltd which became Rubery Owen Conveyancer, and which claims to have launched the UK's first forklift truck in 1946.

During World War II they concentrated on supporting the war effort, producing jerrycans, parts for military aircraft, MKll helmets, and Civilian Protective helmets.

Bolt heads of early post-war Rubery Owen production were marked simply with "RO", and then "Rubery Owen" was spelled out; these bolts made their way to any number of British factories building motor-vehicles, from automobiles to motorcycles. At the same time the company widened its range to include other engineering components for industry, including ploughs for Ferguson Tractors, metal pressings, fasteners, motor vehicle components and structural steel components for the building industry.

In 1950 the company became a member of the new holding company, the "Owen Organisation", under the same ownership. In 1956 they were designing and manufacturing aircraft landing gear. There was a large test rig where the wheel assembly was held, the wheel spun up to the equivalent landing speed and then dropped onto the "ground" to simulate the landing process. Measuring equipment recorded the stresses.

In the 1960s and 1970s Rubery Owen supplied many components to the British motor industry, the most recognised is the Rostyle wheel (the word 'Rostyle' being a contraction of RO-Style). These were distinctive steel disc wheels pressed to a shape to give the effect of spokes. Rostyle wheels were common on British cars of the period both as manufacturer fitted options and aftermarket accessories. In the same time period the company supplied much of the steelwork used to build the London Transport Victoria Line railway.

In 1977 Coventry Climax acquired the Warrington forklift truck business of Rubery Owen Conveyancer.

In 1981 the main Darlaston works closed down.

Rubery Owen is now managed by David Owen, and co run by Jim Owen. David Owen recently sold the building for £1 to Walsall Housing Regeneration Agency (WHRA), a local charity who offers numerous projects based in Darlaston and surrounding areas. David and a small team are still based within Rubery Owen.

== The Owen Group of Companies 1965 ==
England

- Rubery, Owen & Co—Darlaston—Coventry—West Bromwich—Wolverhampton—Prees—Pensnett—Willenhall—Moxley—Bourne
- Bentley Hall Brick Co—Walsall
- Bowser International—London
- W Brealey & Co—Sheffield
- The Brooke Tool Mfg Co—Birmingham

Brooke Tool Automation—Birmingham
T S Harrison & Sons—Heckmondwike
Boxford Machine Tools—Halifax
Fred Whiteley—Halifax
Steel Fabrications (Halifax)—Halifax

- E Camelinat & Co—Birmingham
- The Castra Electric Washing Machine Co—Rodley—Leeds
- Chains—Wednesbury
- Charles Clark & Son—Wolverhampton

Bull Stake Motors (Darlaston)—Darlaston
Charles Clark (Stafford)—Stafford
Charles Clark & Son (Commercial Vehicles)—Wolverhampton

- Esiclene Porcelain-Enamel (1938)—Wolverhampton
- Electro-Hydraulics—Warrington

Conveyancer Fork Trucks—Warrington
Conveyancer-Scott Electric Vehicles—Warrington
Conveyancer-Raymond—Warrington

- Gasel Appliances—Darlaston
- Gasel—Oakengates
- Joseph Gillott & Sons—Sheffield

(Proprietors Cardinal Steels)
Gillotts Forge and Rolling Mills—Sheffield

- W Gwennap (Agricultural)—Stafford
- C & L Hill—Willenhall

C & L Hill (Diecastings)—Willenhall
Hill-Alzen (Sales)—Willenhall

- Central Patternmaking Co—Willenhall
- Hudson Brown–Oldbury
- Invicta Electrodes—Willenhall
- Leabank Office Equipment—London
- Motor Panels (Coventry)—Coventry
- Nuts & Bolts (Darlaston)—Darlaston

J Stanley & Co—Wednesbury

- Owen Kleine Structures—Darlaston
- Shuker & Son (Shrewsbury—Shrewsbury
- J W Baker & Co—Darlaston
- A Warden & Co—London
- Rubery, Owen Kepston—Pensnett
- Rubery, Owen (Warrington)—Warrington
- Rubery, Owen Drott—London
- Salopian Engineers—Prees Salop
- Salopian Kenneth Hudson—Prees Salop
- Shorrock Superchargers—Wednesbury
- A G Sutherland—Birmingham

H T Developments—Birmingham
J B Williams (Maxstoke)—Birmingham

Scotland

- Rubery, Owen & Co—Cumbernauld
- William Donaldson (Engineers)—Paisley

Wales

- Rubery, Owen & Co—Wrexham
- Rogers & Jackson—Wrexham

R & J Wrexham (Wholesale)—Wrexham
J E Brassey & Son—Wrexham

- E Camelinat & Co—Dowlais
- Nuts & Bolts (Darlaston)—Tredegar

Australia

- Rubery, Owen & Kemsley Pty—Finsbury SA—Moorabbin Vic.
- Conveyancer Fork Trucks (Australia) Pty—Rosebery NSW

South Africa

- Ruberowen (South Africa)—Vanderbijlpark Transvaal
- Ruberowen Metal Pressings—Roodeport Transvaal—Port Elizabeth Cape Province
- Rubery, Owen & Scott (S.A.)—Durban

India

- Mahindra Owen—Bombay
- Roplas India Ltd—Poona

Canada

- Rubery Owen, Canada—Toronto
