= Bulk-handling crane =

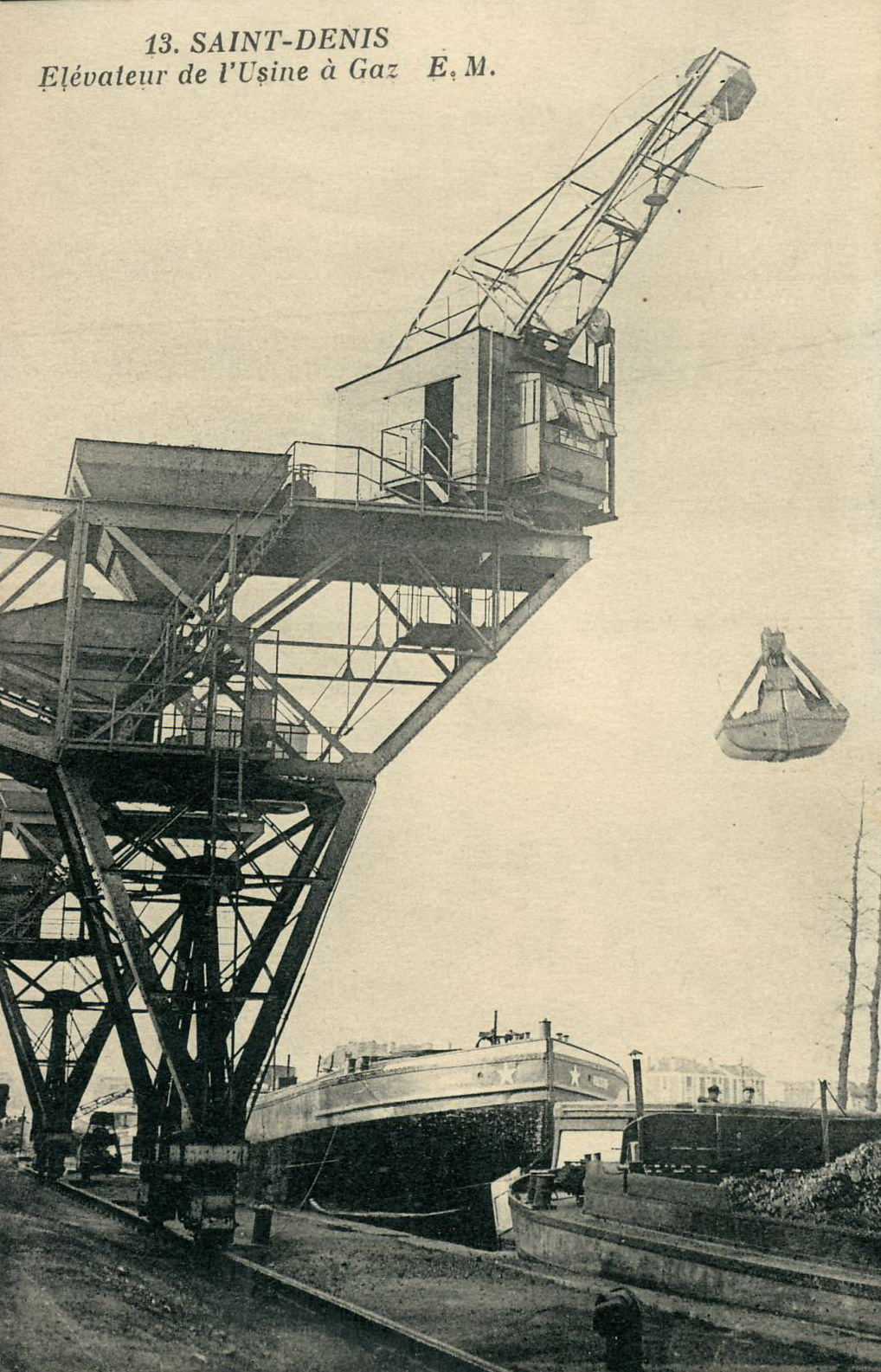
Early French crane loading coal for a gasworks

A bulk-handling crane is one that, instead of a simple hook that can handle a range of slung loads, has an integral grab for lifting bulk cargoes such as coal, mineral ore etc.

Where the grab is a two-piece hinged bucket, it is known as a shell grab or shell bucket. Working the grab requires extra cables from the crane jib, so requires a specialised design of crane throughout, not merely an attachment. Some grabs use 2 cables for lift and control, others use 4.

In 1927, Stothert & Pitt of Bath, Somerset produced the first specialised bulk-handling crane. This was to unload coal at Barking power station in London.

The grab has to be selected so that the combined weight of grab and contents does not exceed the grabbing safe working load of the crane. The mass of the contents depends upon the properties of the product being handled; its density, flow characteristics, angle of repose, lump/grain size, purity (e.g. is it wet or dry) and, in some cases, degree of settlement (e.g. a ship's cargo has compacted due to vibration, rolling, pitching and yawing over a long voyage).

Most bulk-handling cranes are dedicated to a single product, but others will handle various materials and need a selection of grabs. Some applications (e.g. manganese ore) may also require the use of teeth fitted to the grab jaws to enable penetration. Other applications (e.g. rape seed) may require to be self-sealing and have offset lower jaws with serrated, angle cut side cutters to restrain easy-flow properties.

When off-loading a ship, the grab may be more efficient if designed with a low-profile extended body which enables reaching under the ship's hatches, negating any need to centre the product with human and machinery access. The grab mechanism may be four rope, double rope, single rope ring discharge, single rope self-dumping, double chain, single chain self-dumping, single chain ring discharge, hydraulic or electro-hydraulic.

== Grab types ==
Rope grabs have rope pulleys in both the upper and lower girders and close by drawing the closing rope(s) to shorten the gap between the two girders. The minimum diameter of the pulley is restricted by the ratio of the pulley diameter to the rope diameter, the strands of the wire rope being subjected to fatigue bending stresses if the pulley is too small, giving premature failure. The physical size of the pulleys then determines the size of the girders, then determining a break point between a four rope and a two rope design. The closing force at the shell jaws, and, inversely, the speed of closure, are determined by the number of pulleys on each closing rope in the two girders. The closing rope is fed into the grab mechanism through either a bellmouth or an arrangement of small rollers. The weight of the grab is supported by the holding rope(s) and pinned to the upper girder allowing some angular freedom. Holding and closing ropes require separate winding drums in the crane.

The mechanism on chain grabs operates in the same way as on rope grabs. The chains are connected to ropes on the crane by (e.g. bordeaux) couplings which allow rotation. A linked chain requires a much small diameter pulley than the equivalent rope which makes a smaller, more compact, design of girder. Chains used on chain pulleys are less easily inspected for wear and fatigue than ropes which show outer strand deformation well before failure. Failure of a rope or chain is a very high severity (dangerous) hazard.

Ring discharge grabs have a single supporting rope or chain which means that a port with limited craneage, or even a ship's lifting boom can be used at a port where no facilities are available for bulk handling to load or offload the cargo. A cast steel ring is hung from the end of the boom through which the rope or chain passes to the grab. The outside of the ring has a lip at its lower edge. The top of the grab has a pivoting hook protruding from the top girder which catches the lip and allows opening and closing. The clamshell bucket on the right hand side of the photograph on this page at Cardiff is a chain ring discharge grab.

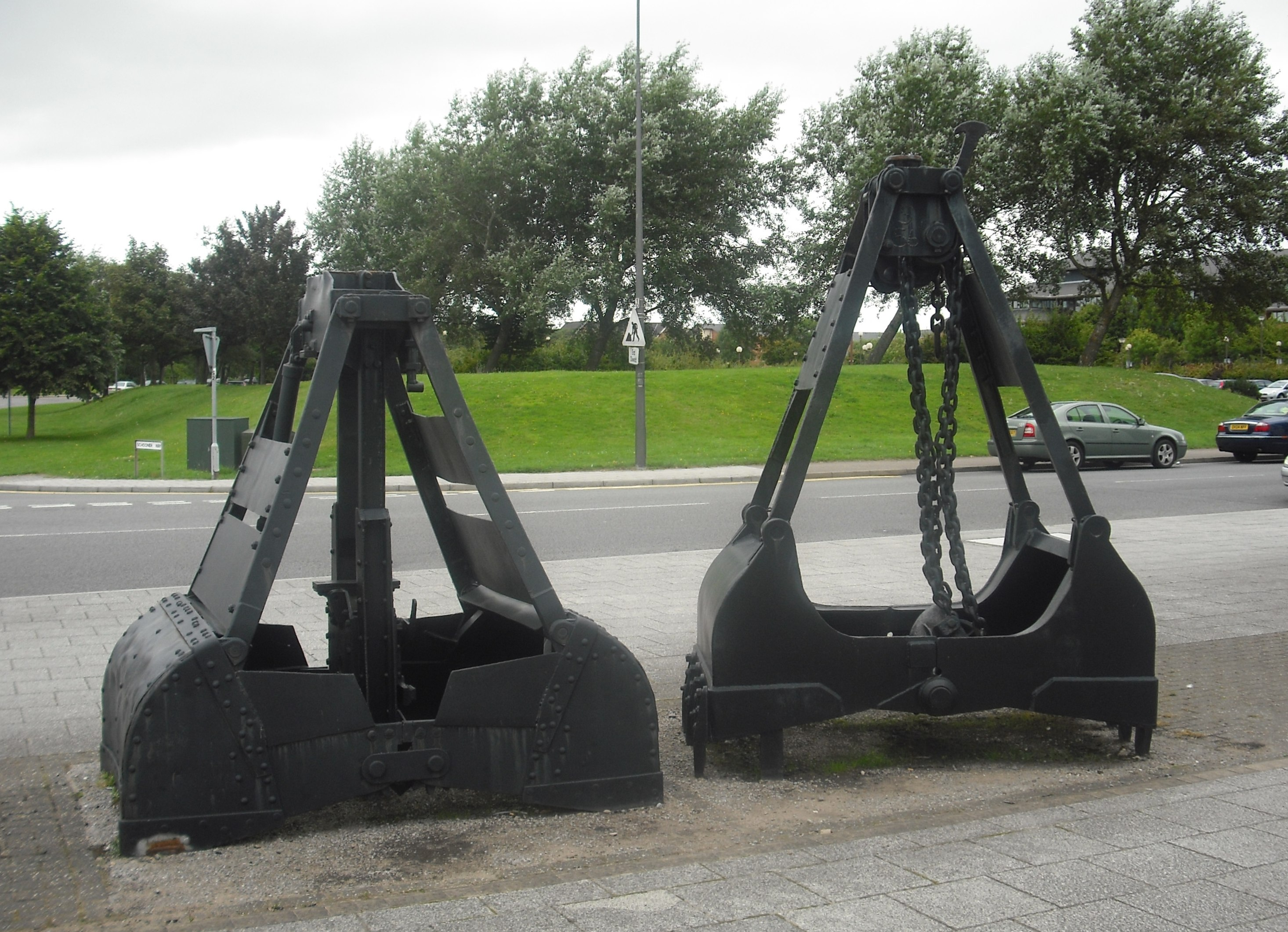
Clamshell buckets, now retired at a coal dock re-development in Cardiff

Self-dumping grabs also have a single supporting rope or chain. The lower girder contains a linkage mechanism with hooks which connect to the upper girder, holding the grab closed. When the grab is lowered onto the spoil, weights release the hooks and allow the grab to open when lifted. A lever may also be fitted to this type of mechanism to which a long trip rope can be attached which, when pulled by a banksman, releases the catches in the mechanism and allows the grab to open in mid air (e.g. above a lorry or a hopper). The grab usually is fitted with a hydraulic damper to restrict the speed of opening. The clamshell bucket on the left hand side of the photograph on this page at Cardiff is a self-dumping chain grab.

Generally, grabs have an open top to the shell body. Grabs handling light-weight powders which may be blown from the grab are sometimes fitted with covers which may be fixed or pivoted at the lower arm connection.

In addition to shell-bodied grabs, there are tine grabs, exemplified by the orange peel grab which has tines (typically 6 or 8) fitted with full plates completely enclosing the product when closed. Other tine grabs have no plate, some have a partial plate. Tine grabs have the ability to penetrate into dense and integrated products such as scrap metal and ores. They are also often used in recycling plants, handling general waste.

A rope or chain tine grab has synchronised closure of the tines. Other tine grabs use hydraulic closure with a hydraulic ram on each tine providing independent motion and improved penetration. The hydraulic supply and control is generated on the crane.

Some grabs are electro-hydraulic, having an electric motor in the top girder which drives a hydraulic pump and all control gear. The crane provides a holding rope and an electrical supply and control cable.

An additional feature sometimes fitted to the crane, used to restrict the tendency of the grab to rotate on the axis of the holding ropes, is a tagline (sometimes referred to as a grabline) mechanism. The design can vary but is typically a coiled spring contained within a horizontal tube with a rope drum on the end.

=== Orange-peel grabs ===
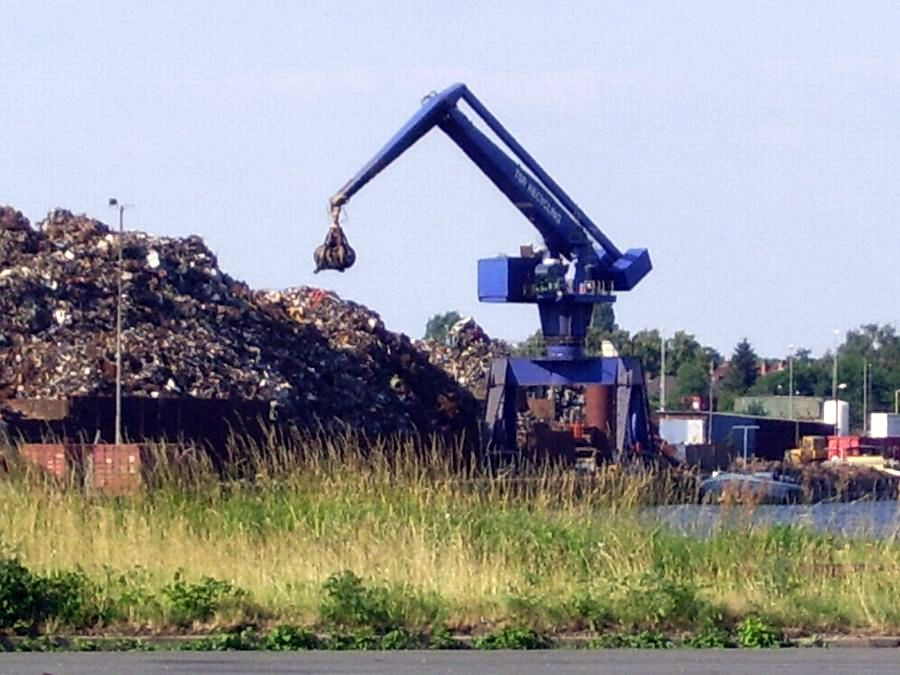
Orange-peel grab attached directly to jib

Where a cargo is coarser in size than minerals, commonly for scrap metal, then an orange-peel grab may be used instead of a shell. These have six or eight segments of "peel" independently hinged around a central core. They are better able to grab at an uneven load, rather than just scooping at small pieces. If the load is made of long thin pieces, a grab may also be able to carry far more than a single "grabful" at one time.

Although orange-peel grabs may be hung from cables on a jib, they're also commonly mounted directly onto a jib. This is more suitable for grabbing at awkward loads that might otherwise tend to tip a hanging grab over. They may also use hydraulics to control the segments rather than weight and hoist cables.

== Kangaroo cranes ==
Rather than slewing (rotating) the crane to reach the delivery hopper on-shore, a kangaroo crane has its own in-built hopper beneath the jib, that slews with it as the crane rotates. Dumping the grab contents into the hopper now only requires the quicker luffing movement, without needing to slew for each load.

The term "kangaroo crane" has also been applied more recently to jumping cranes, tower cranes used in the construction of skyscrapers that are capable of raising their towers as construction grows upwards.

== See also ==
- Hulett
