= Bristol Industrial Museum =

Former museum in Bristol, England

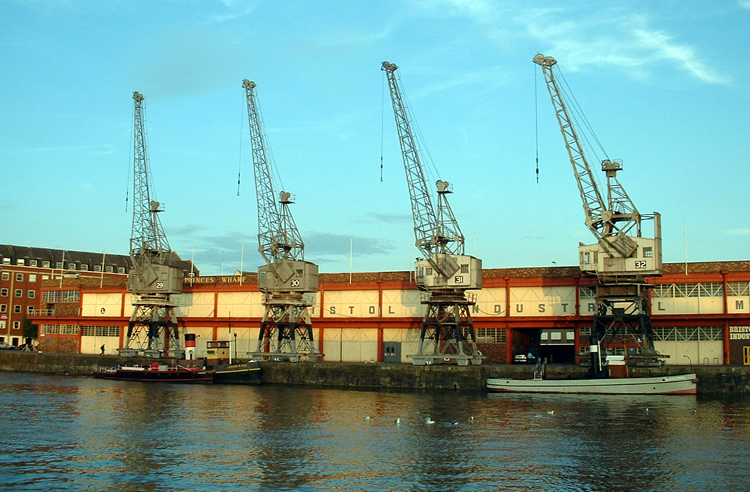

- Location within Bristol
- Location: Bristol
- Coordinates: 51.44726°N 2.59856°W
- Website: Bristol Industrial Museum

The Bristol Industrial Museum was a museum in Bristol, England, located on Prince's Wharf beside the Floating Harbour. It opened in the former transit sheds L and M on Princes Wharf in 1978. On display were items from Bristol's industrial past – including aviation, car and bus manufacture, printing – and exhibits documenting Bristol's maritime history. The museum was managed by Bristol City Council along with nearby preserved industrial relics along Prince's Wharf, including the Bristol Harbour Railway, cranes and a small fleet of preserved vessels. The railway, cranes and vessels all now form part of the working exhibits at M Shed Museum.

The museum closed its doors to the public on 29 October 2006 to become M Shed, the Museum of Bristol, with the same façade and incorporating many of the exhibits. The new museum opened on 17 June 2011.

== Overview ==
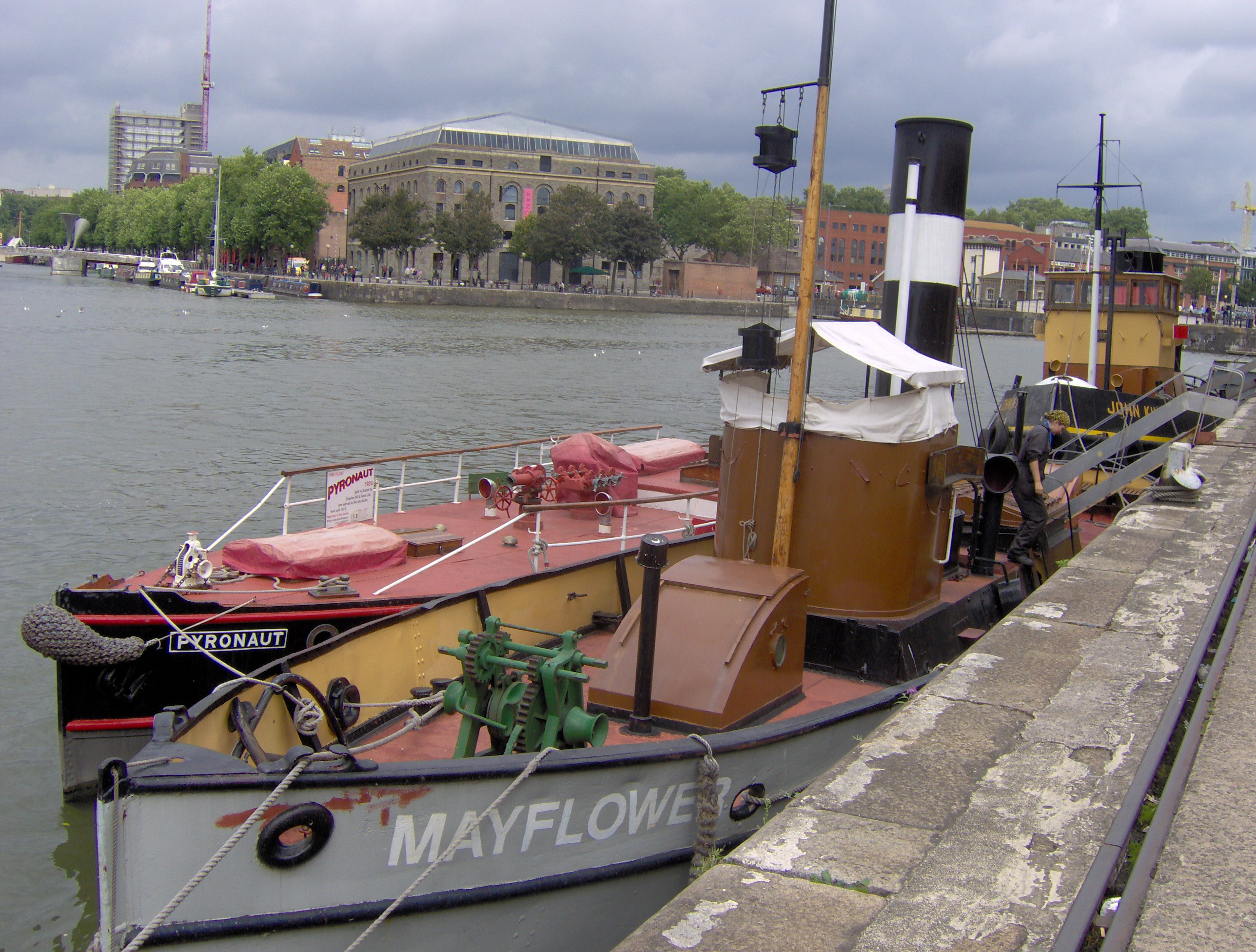
Fireboat "Pyronaut", steam tug "Mayflower", and diesel tug John King

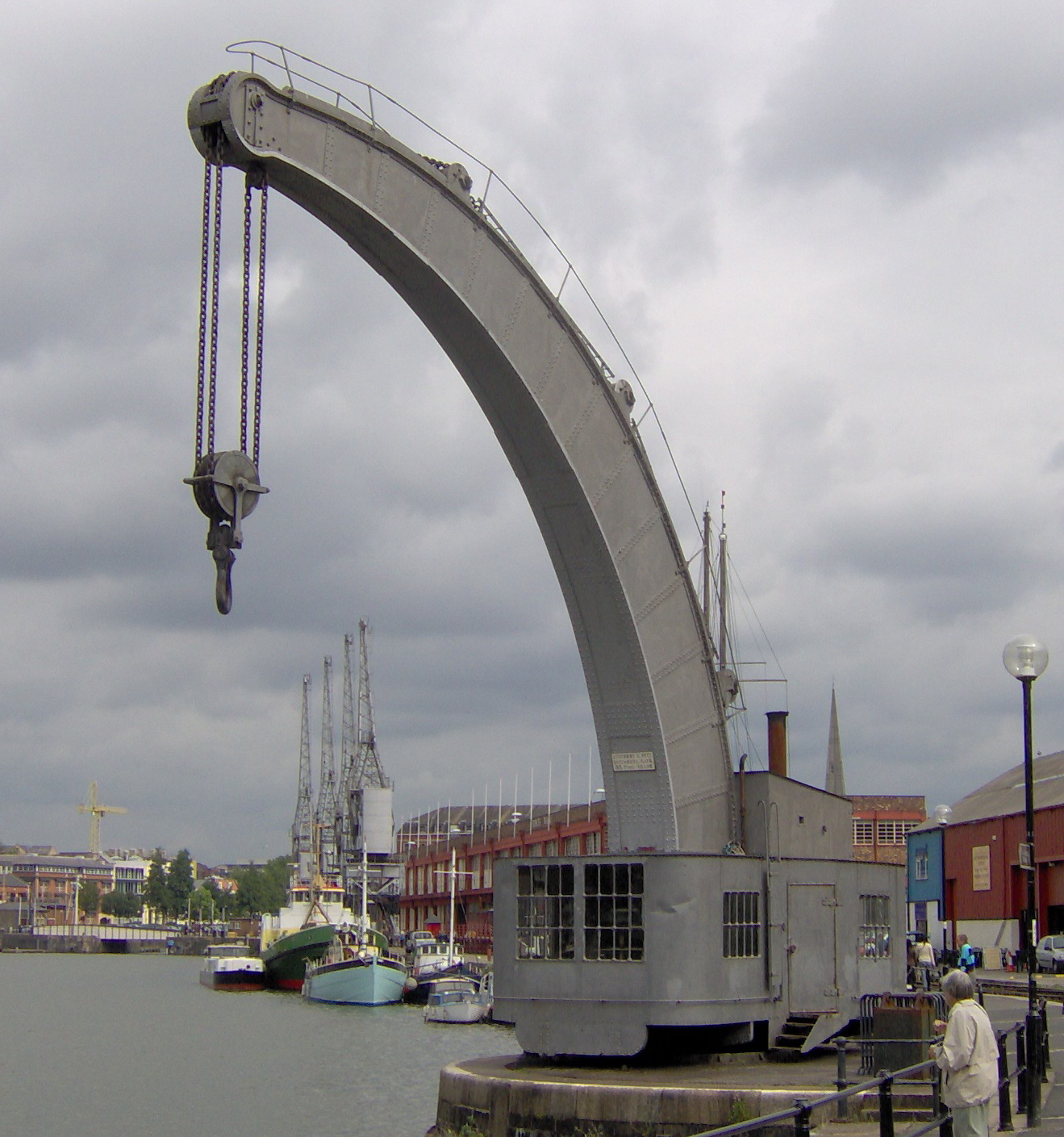
Fairbairn Steam Crane (1878)

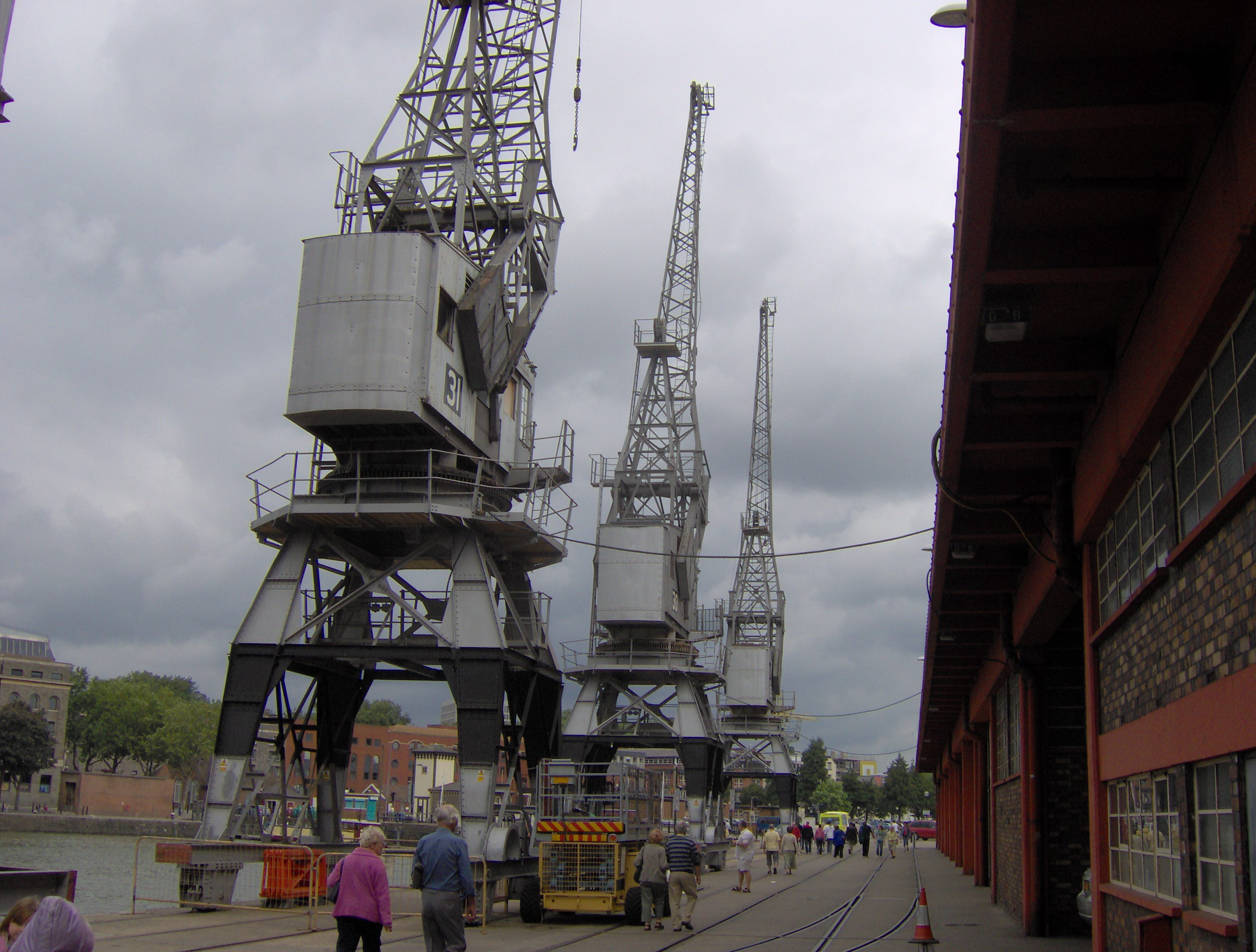
Cranes (1951) outside Bristol Industrial Museum

The museum's indoor exhibits were housed on the two floors of a former quayside transit shed.

=== Road transport ===
On the lower floor was the transport gallery, which housed various land transport exhibits with a particular Bristol slant. Exhibits included what is believed to be the world's first purpose-built holiday caravan to be compared with a 1950s equivalent, the Grenville steam carriage, bicycles, motorcycles, cars, carriages and buses.

=== Aviation ===
On the upper floor the aviation gallery told the story of Bristol's involvement in aircraft manufacture and contained a collection of Bristol-made aero engines, a Bristol-built helicopter, a mock-up flight deck of Concorde and scale models showing the many aircraft built in the city. On the same floor the story of the Port of Bristol was told with models, paintings and other exhibits.

=== Print & Pack ===
The adjacent Print & Pack gallery told the story of one of Bristol's biggest industries with machinery and products. This was a particularly popular working exhibit, with live demonstrations of printing machinery such as Linotype and Letterpress. These same exhibits also printed many of the museum's own leaflets, tickets and flyers.

=== Bristol and Transatlantic Slavery gallery ===
Elsewhere in the museum, the Bristol and Transatlantic Slavery gallery told the story of Bristol's involvement in the trans-Atlantic slave trade between the UK, Africa and the Caribbean, from its early days through abolition and to recent times.

=== Historic ships, cranes and trains ===
Normally moored in front of the developing new museum is the collection of historic vessels, which included the 1934 fireboat Pyronaut and two tugs: John King built as a diesel tug in 1935 and Mayflower, the world's oldest surviving steam tug built in 1861.

On the quayside outside the museum are four electrically powered cargo cranes built in 1951 by Stothert & Pitt. A short distance to the west is much older crane, the sole surviving operational example of a Fairbairn steam crane. Built in 1878, also by Stothert & Pitt, it was in regular use until 1973 loading and unloading ships and railway wagons with loads up to 35 tons. It has been restored and is in working order, operating on some bank holidays and the Bristol Harbour Festival. Bristol Harbour Railway continues to offer train rides along the quayside on bank holidays, using restored steam locomotives and rolling stock.
