= Level luffing crane =

Crane whose hook remains level while the jib moves vertically

A 3d animated model of a level-luffing crane

A level-luffing crane is a crane mechanism where the hook remains at the same level while luffing: moving the jib up and down, so as to move the hook inwards and outwards relative to the base.

Usually the description is only applied to those with a luffing jib that have some additional mechanism applied to keep the hook level when luffing.

Level-luffing is most important when careful movement of a load near ground level is required, such as in construction or shipbuilding. This partially explains the popularity of fixed horizontal jibs in these fields.

== Toplis cable luffing ==
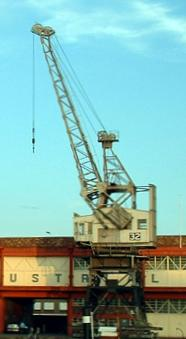
Stothert & Pitt crane with Toplis gear

An early form of level-luffing gear was the "Toplis" design, invented by a Stothert & Pitt engineer in 1914. The crane jibs luffs as for a conventional crane, with the end of the jib rising and falling. The crane's hook is kept level by automatically paying out enough extra cable to compensate for this. This is also a purely mechanical linkage, arranged by the reeving of the hoist cables to the jib over a number of pulleys at the crane's apex above the cab, so that luffing the jib upwards allows more free cable and lowers the hook to compensate.

== Horse-head jibs ==
Horse-head jib, showing the level position of the hook

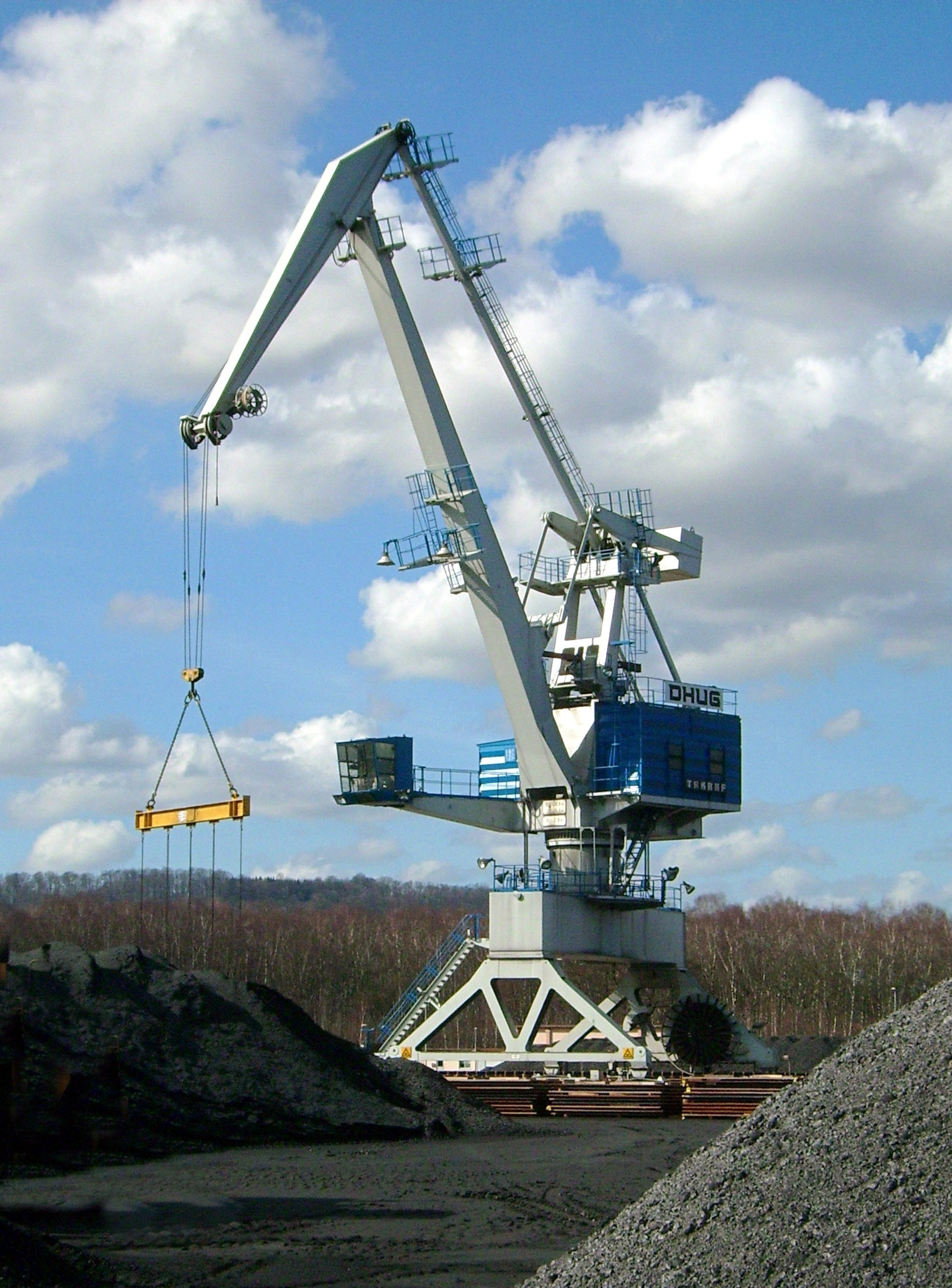
Horse-head design

The usual mechanism for level-luffing in modern cranes is to add an additional "horse head" section to the top of the jib. By careful design of the geometry, this keeps level merely by the linked action of the pivots.

== Powered level-luffing ==
As cranes and their control systems became more sophisticated, it became possible to control the level of luffing directly, by winching the hoist cable in and out as needed. The first of these systems used mechanical clutches between luffing and hoist drums, giving simplicity and a "near level" result.

Later systems have used modern electronic controls and quickly reversible motors with good slow-speed control to the hoist winch motors, so as to give a positioning accuracy of inches. Some early systems used controllable hydraulic gearboxes to achieve the same result, but these added complexity and cost and so were only popular where high accuracy was needed, such as for shipbuilding.

== Luffing cabs ==
Luffing mechanisms have also been applied to the driver's cab being mounted on its own jib, following the movement of the crane's main jib. These are used for tasks such as ship unloading, where the view from the driver's cab is greatly improved by cantilevering it forwards and over the ship.

== Meccano models ==
Cranes have long been a popular subject for Meccano models, and luffing cranes are no exception.
