= Jib (crane) =

Horizontal or near-horizontal beam used in many types of crane to support the load

Animation of main (green truss structure) and jib boom (purple truss structure) articulation. This specific example uses a level luffing mechanism to maintain the load at approximately the same vertical height as the jib moves through its range of travel.

A jib or jib arm is the horizontal or near-horizontal beam used in many types of crane to support the load clear of the main support. An archaic spelling is gib.

Usually jib arms are attached to a vertical mast or tower or sometimes to an inclined boom. In other jib-less designs such as derricks, the load is hung directly from a boom which is often anomalously called a jib.

A camera jib or jib arm in cinematography is a small crane that holds nothing but the camera.

== Jib cranes ==
A jib crane is a crane that employs a horizontal jib or jib arm attached to a vertical support structure. Common configurations include pillar-mounted and wall-mounted jib cranes. Such cranes are widely used for localized material handling in manufacturing facilities, warehouses, workshops, and maintenance operations.
