= Stothert & Pitt =

Former British engineering company

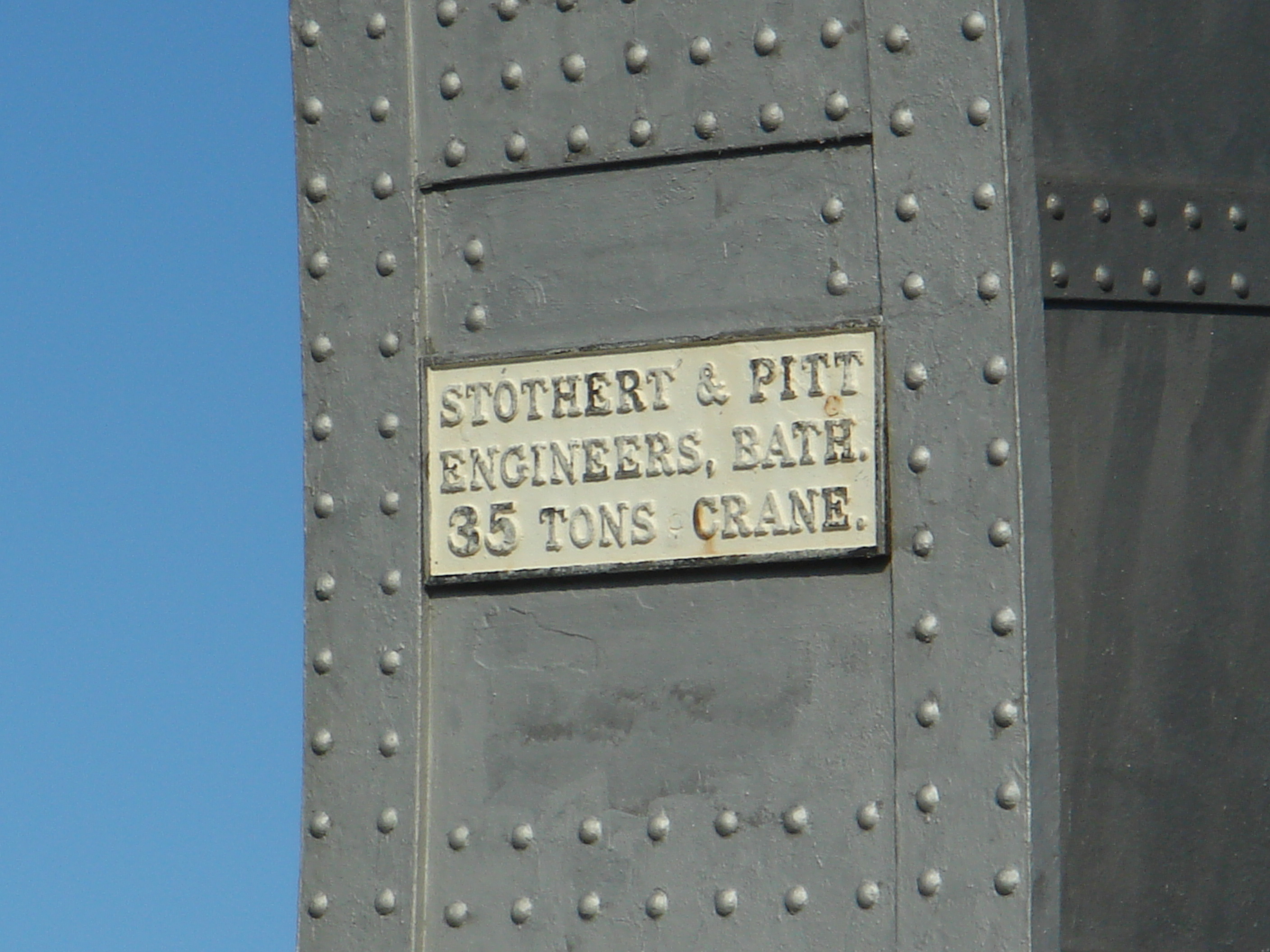
Maker's plate of the Fairbairn crane

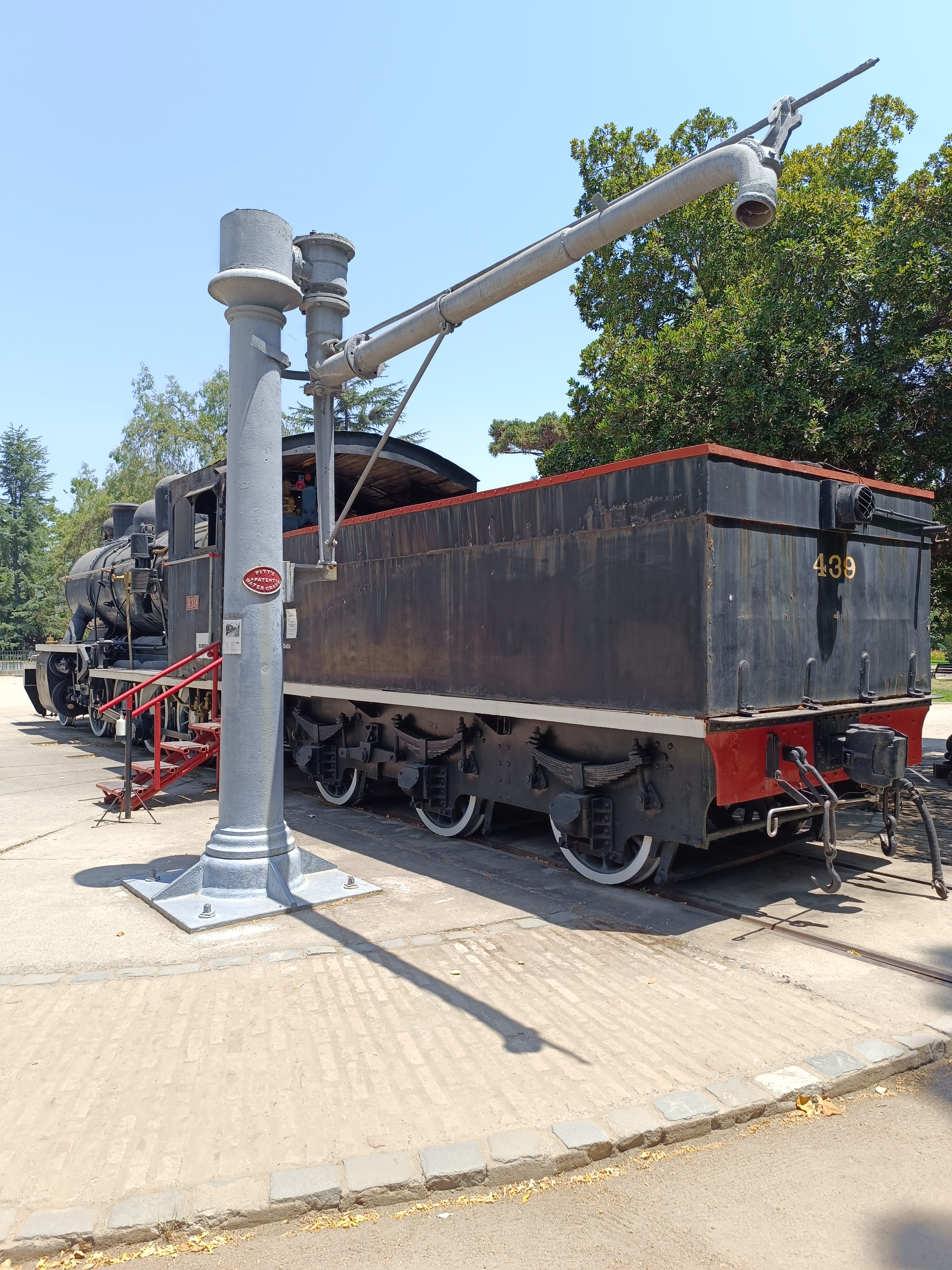
Water crane. Stothert & Pitt, 1875. Santiago Railway Museum.

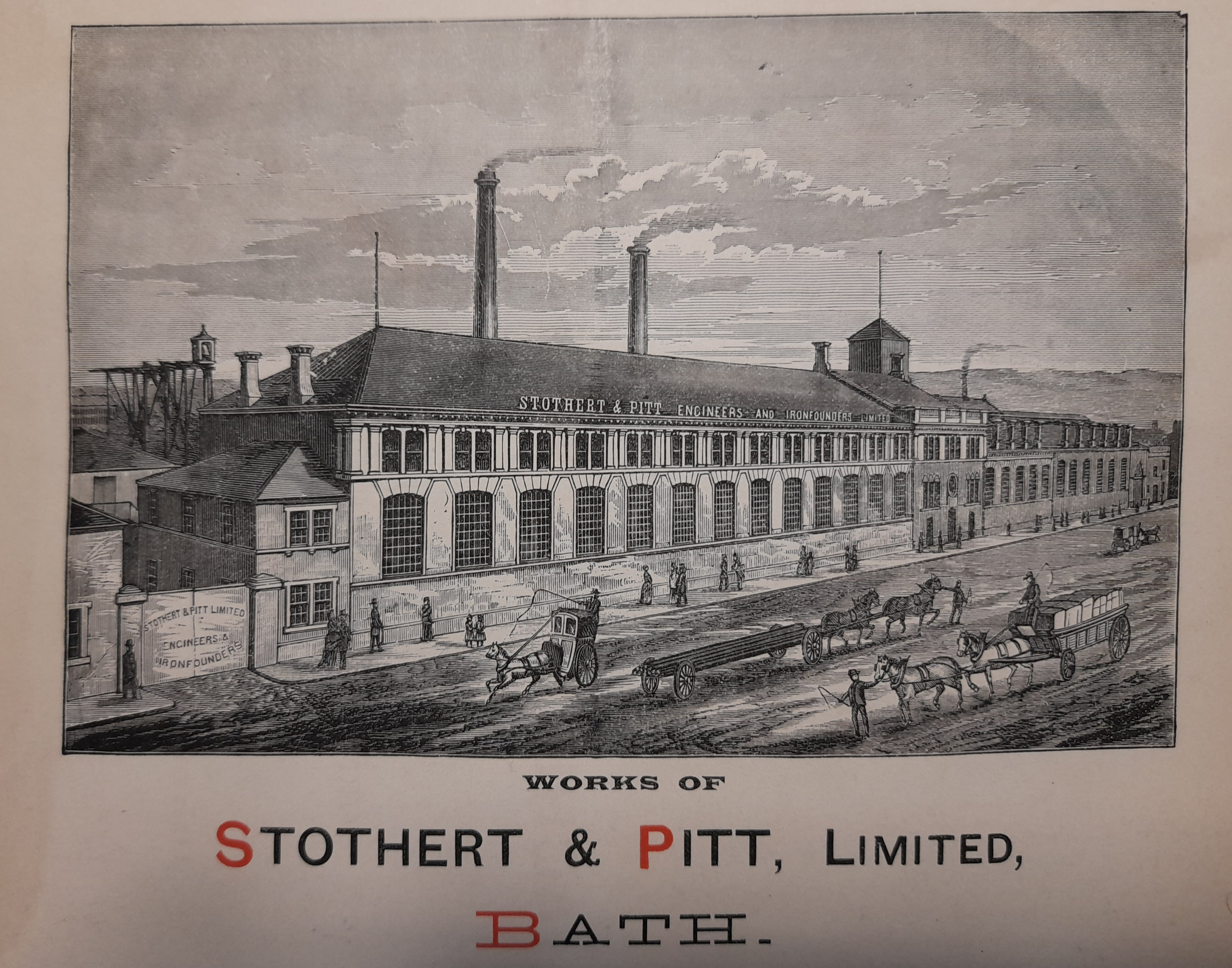
Stothert & Pitt Newark Works, Lower Bristol Road 1885

Stothert & Pitt was a British engineering company founded in 1855 in Bath, England. It was the builder of various engineering products ranging from Dock cranes to construction plant and household cast iron items. It went out of business in 1989. The name and intellectual property became part of Clarke Chapman.

== History ==
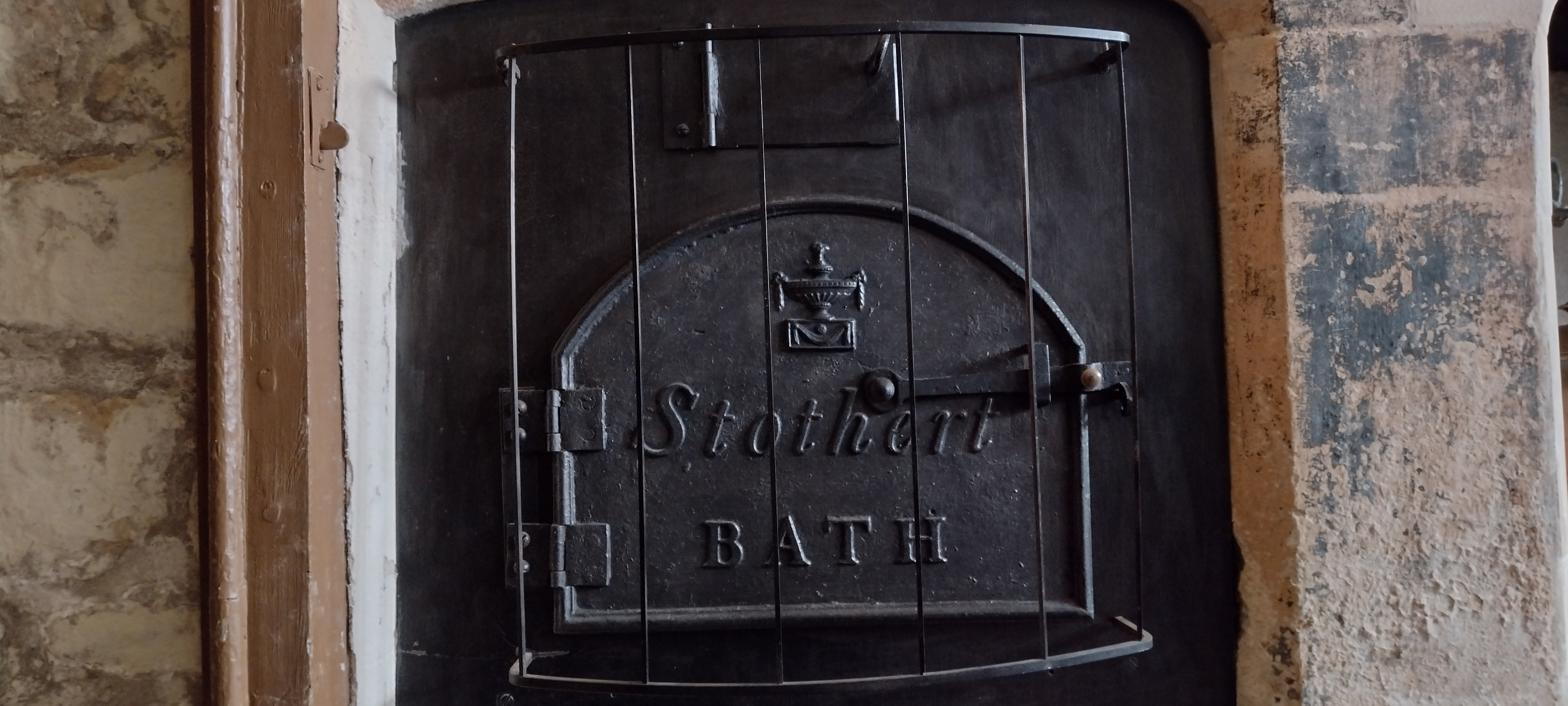
The Stothert oven at No 1 Royal Crescent

George Stothert (n.b. early on the name is sometimes rendered as Stoddard or Stodhert) moved to Bath in 1785 having taken over Thomas Harris's ironmonger's business. He was an agent for Abraham Darby I's Coalbrookdale Iron Company, selling all types of domestic ironmongery. By 1815 they set up their own foundry as Abraham Darby had opened his own warehouse in Bristol. The company was now managed by his son, also George. In 1851 they exhibited a hand crane at the Great Exhibition.

In 1837, Henry Stothert, brother of the younger George, set up an ironworks in Bristol, first as Henry Stothert & Co., then, joined by Edward Slaughter, Stothert, Slaughter & Co. Slaughter had earlier formed Slaughter & Co. at his Avonside Ironworks, later and better known as Avonside. This works produced some substantial iron engineering including a swivel bridge over the river Frome, several of the first engines for Brunel's Great Western Railway and the Bristol and Exeter Railway, as well as 14 engines for the Brighton and South Coast Railway. Stothert, Slaughter & Co. started building ships in 1844; this part of the business moved to Hotwells in 1852 and by 1855 was a separate company under the management of Henry's nephew George Kelson Stothert (son of his brother John). By 1862 it had become G.K. Stothert & Co.

Robert Pitt became an apprentice with Stothert in Bath in 1834 to 1840. In 1840-41 he was working as a draughtsman for Stothert, Slaughter & Co. in Bristol but was back in Bath from 1841 to 1842 helping with the establishment of Stothert's Newark Street Foundry. In 1844 Pitt became a partner with Stotherts along with a second partner Rayno, sometimes referred to as Stothert, Rayno & Pitt, the firm was usually, simply, called Stotherts. In 1855 it became Stothert and Pitt, in 1883 a limited company and in 1902 the firm became a limited company

In the period from the 1840s to 1900 the Bath company expanded rapidly. Moving from earlier premises on the north side of the river Avon, to the Newark Street Works on the south-side, then, developing the Victoria Works in the 1890s which filled the valley between the river and the Lower Bristol Road. Some early work by Stothert can still be seen on the Kennett & Avon Canal in Bath, where two very elegant iron bridges span the canal with the Stothert name on them. However, it was in the 1840s that the firm began to develop the cranes which eventually were to make them a world name in crane building.

The earliest surviving crane which was probably made by Stothert can be found at Carmarthen and dates from about 1850, but it bears no name plate. The oldest crane bearing the Stothert & Pitt name was used in Box quarries and probably dates from the 1860s, it was designed to lift 6 tons and sat in a garden in Box until it was fully restored and returned to the regenerated Newark Works being officially unveiled at the site in June 2023. The company began to make its name in the world of large scale crane manufacture when in 1869 they made a Titan crane for setting 27-ton blocks during construction of the Manora Point breakwater, Karachi ('Kurrachee'). Tested with 40-ton load in Bath, September 1869 [9].

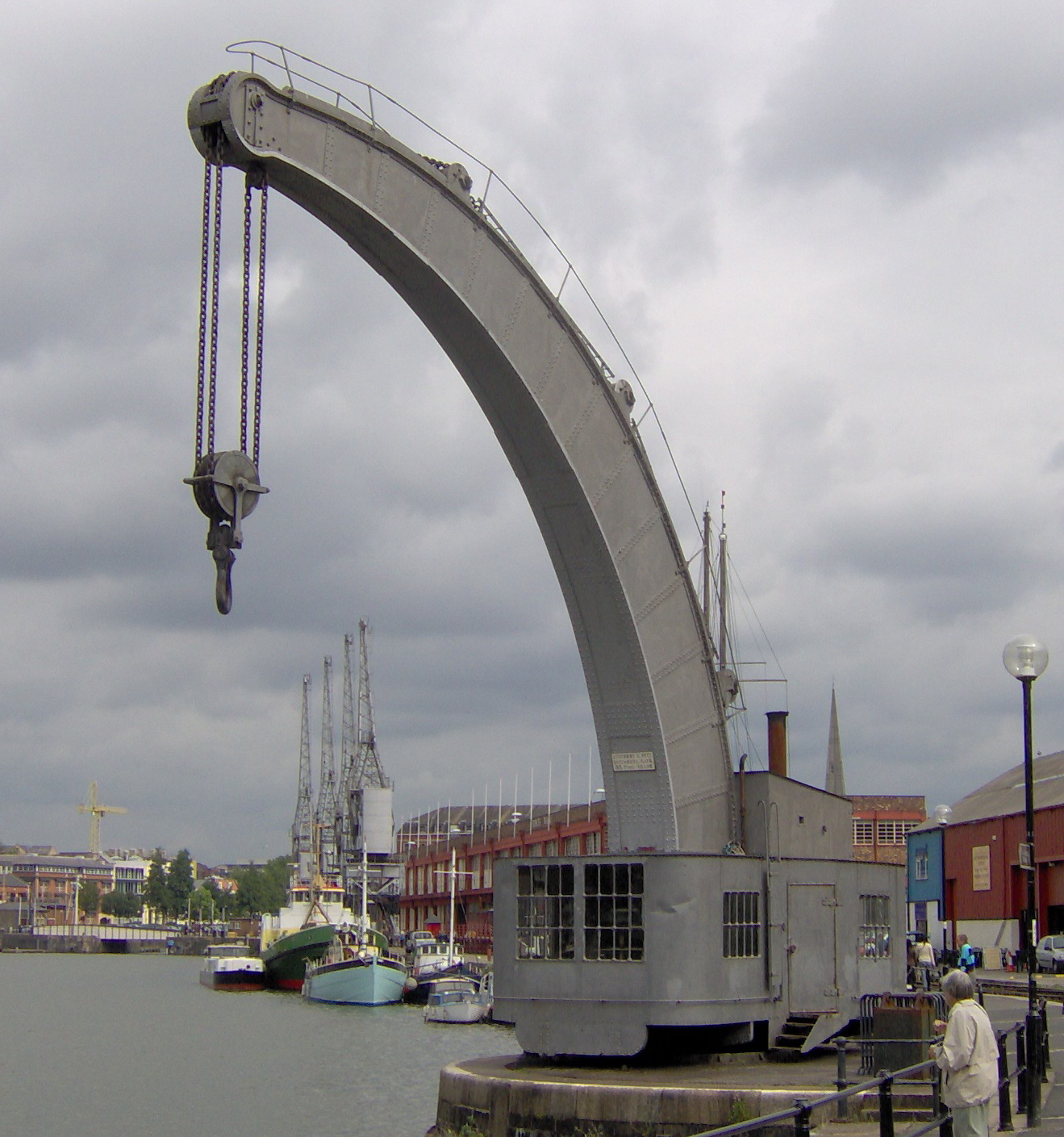
Fairbairn steam crane

They then built a 35 ton Fairbairn steam crane for Bristol docks in 1876, to an improved design by William Fairbairn. The boiler maker's plate reads "Marshall Sons & Co. Ltd., Engineers, Gainsboro, England, No.92766". In 1876 they supplied a blocksetting crane to Colombo Harbour Works, Ceylon for breakwater works. Stothert and Pitt; 17/30-ton non rotative, sidesetter.

=== 20th century ===
Building rail cranes for export to the colonies.

==== Electric dock cranes ====
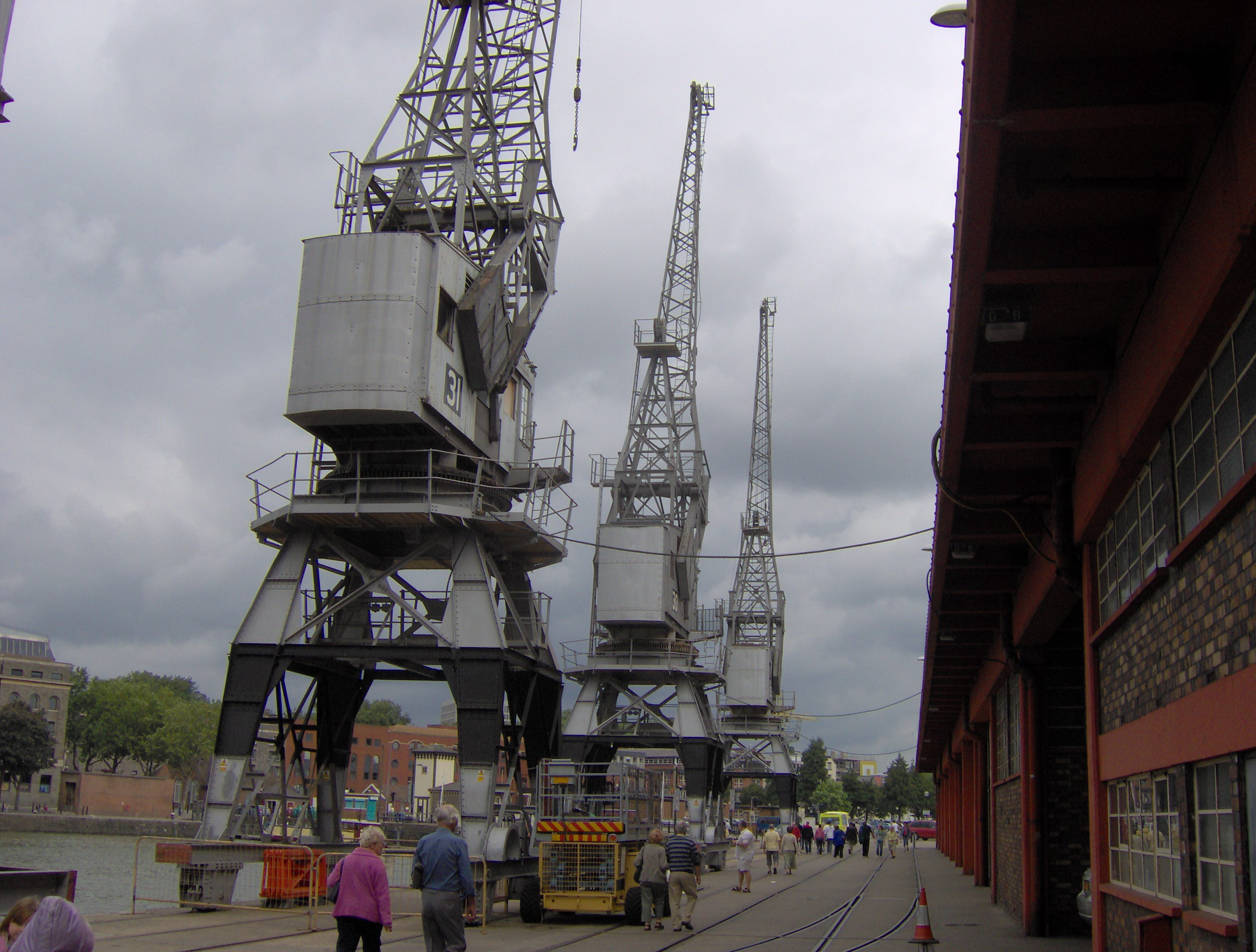
Electric dock cranes in Bristol

Stothert and Pitt supplied their earliest electric powered crane to Southampton Dock Authority in 1892. Electric power provided several advantages: powerful motors could be placed in each crane and powered centrally, without requiring a separate prime mover (i.e. steam engine and boiler) in each crane. The crane mechanisms were also lighter, allowing them to be placed on raised carriages that could then straddle a railway freight line- the portal crane. Rather than requiring a bare strip of unused quayside between the railway line and the harbour wall to leave space for cranes, the railway could now be brought right to the dock edge. Cranes were also available immediately, without waiting for boilers to raise steam. Most importantly though (and an advantage over centrally powered hydraulic cranes), electric cranes were now mobile along the dock edge on their own rail lines. Rather than ships queueing for a single berth space alongside a fixed crane, cranes could be brought to each ship's hold hatches as needed. This made a single crane far more efficient, in terms of cargo handled per day. Soon such mobile electric cranes were near universal.

Five examples of electric cranes provided in 1951 have been preserved by Bristol Museum Service at Princes Wharf.

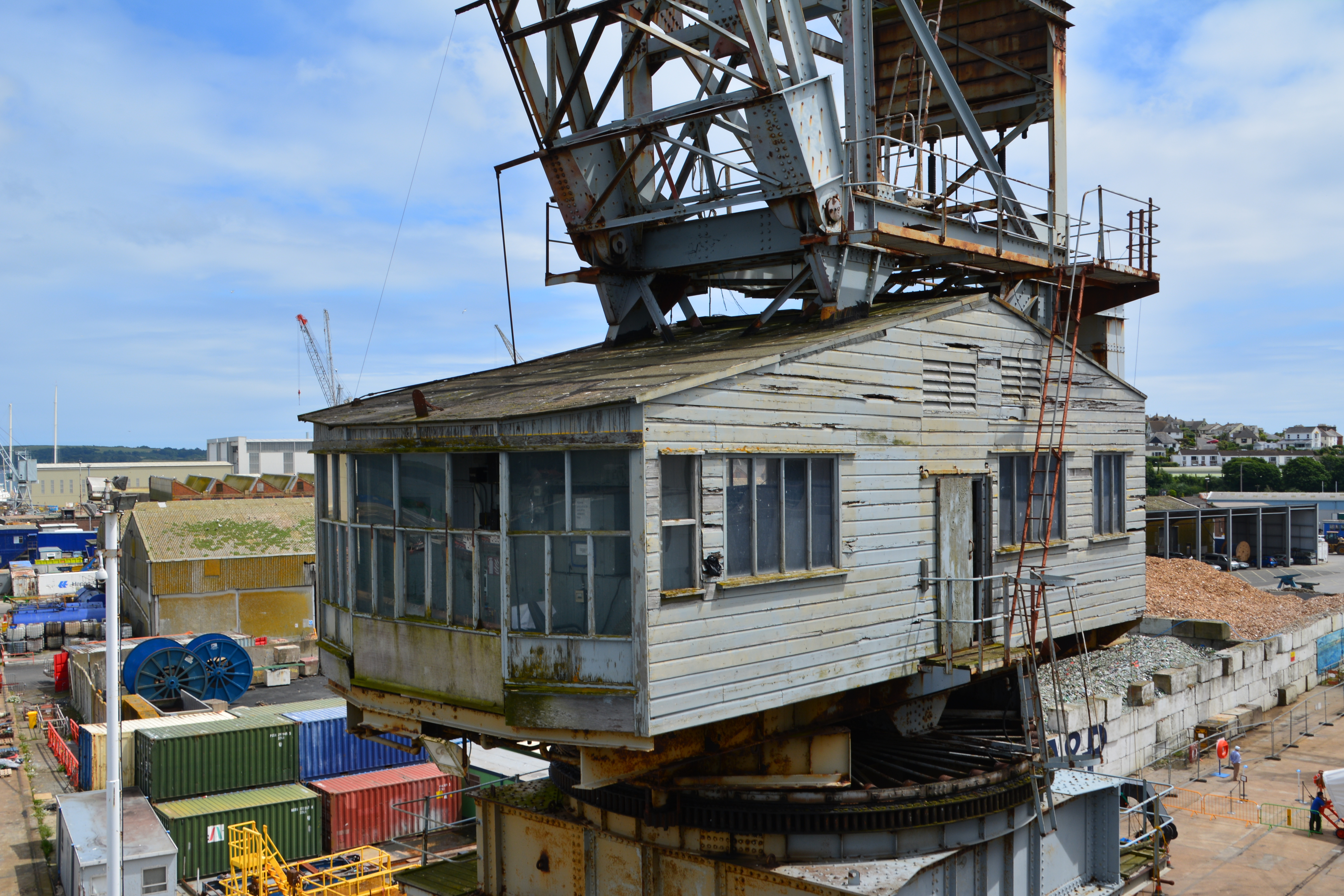
Cabin, 1954 Stothert & Pitt Crane, Falmouth Docks

==== Level-luffing cranes ====
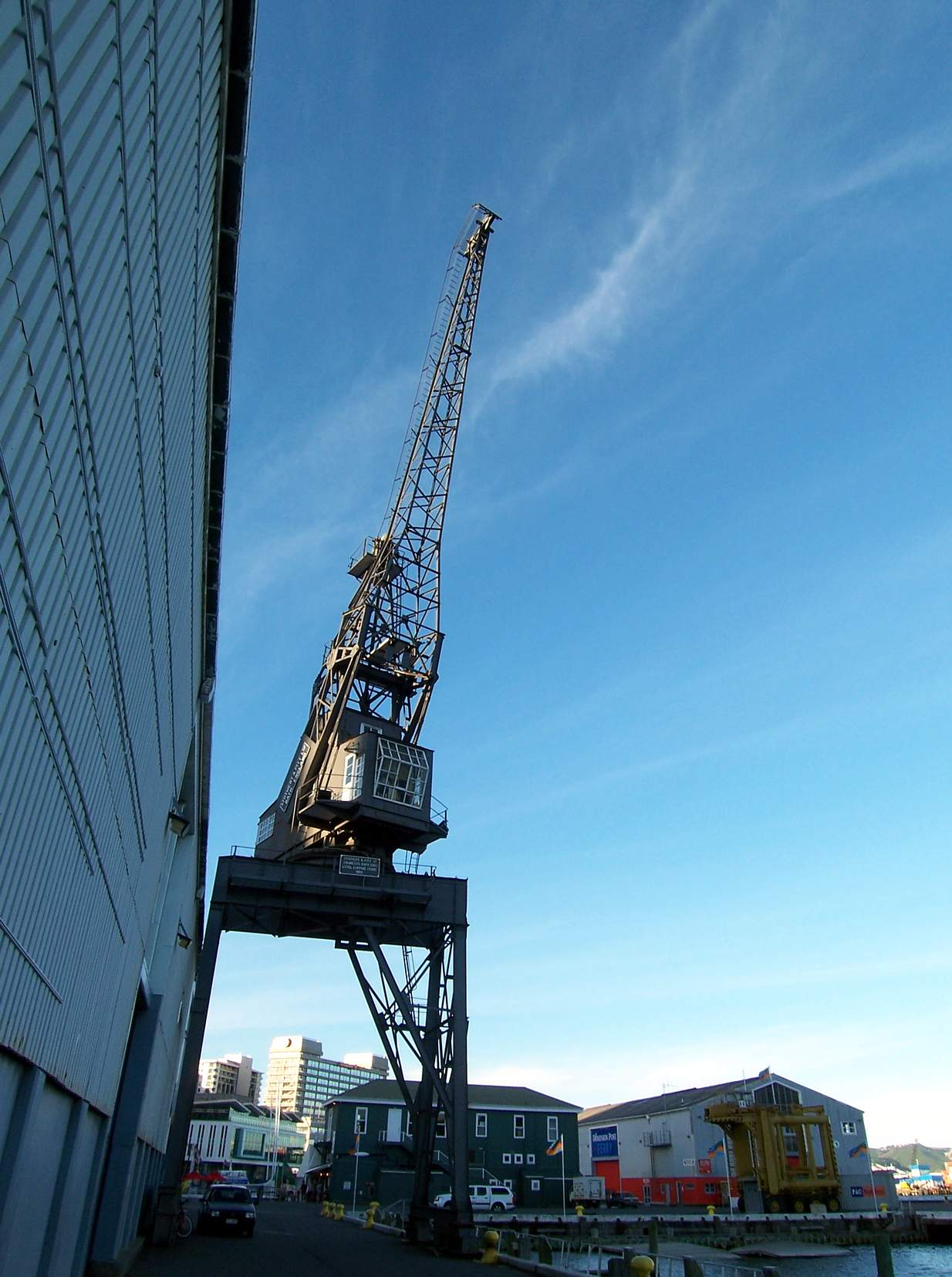
Wellington, New Zealand

In 1912, Stothert & Pitt's design team, led by Claude Topliss, developed an improved design of level luffing gear, which greatly improved the speed and efficiency of cargo handling cranes fitted with it. . This used an arrangement of compensating hoist cables to automatically keep the hook, and load, level as the jib was luffed up and down.

==== Bulk handling cranes ====
As cranes became more common in docks, and as ships became bigger, they also became more specialised. In 1927, Stothert & Pitt produced the first bulk-handling crane. Rather than a simple hook that could handle a range of slung loads, this was a crane designed around the use of an integral grab. Working the grab requires extra cable or cables from the crane jib, so these are a whole specialised design. The first was to unload coal at a power station in London.

Another innovation was the kangaroo crane. Rather than slewing (rotating) the crane to reach the delivery hopper on-shore, a kangaroo crane has its own in-built hopper beneath the jib, that slews with it. Dumping the grab contents into the hopper now only requires the quicker luffing movement, without needing to slew.

==== World War I ====
In July 1915 the company took over the construction of the Pedrail Machine, an attempt to create an armoured fighting vehicle for use on the Western Front. The machine, designed by Colonel R. E. B. Crompton, a consultant to the Landship Committee, ran on a pair of pedrail tracks in tandem. It was intended to mount an armoured body on the chassis so that a party of troops could be carried across no-man's-land. After the Landship Committee decided against the machine, the War Office transferred construction to S&P, with a view to completing it as a mobile flame-thrower. The finished chassis was handed over to the Trench Warfare Department in August, but no further development took place.

==== World War II ====
During World War II the company built tanks and miniature submarines for the War Office and was a significant manufacturer of armaments. Stothert's also supplied the Royal Navy with cranes mounted on ships used for hoisting reconnaissance sea-planes from the water.

The Challenger tank was a development of the Cromwell tank chassis, so as to take the more powerful 17 Pounder gun. Stothert & Pitt built this tank and designed various modifications. Lengthening the chassis from five roadwheels to six presented no difficulty for such an engineering firm, but designing armoured fighting vehicles was new to them and their efforts were not wholly successful. The new turret for Challenger carried the gun and its higher recoil well enough, but only by being nearly twice the height of other turrets for this chassis – making the tank a much easier target. The A30 (Avenger) tank destroyer was a similar development of a 17pdr gun on the same lengthened chassis, but had an open-topped turret 2 feet lower than that of Challenger. During the development of Challenger, the prototype turret was first mounted on the even larger TOG 2.

==== Post-war era ====
By 1974, Stothert & Pitt had built 30,000 single-drum pedestrian rollers.

=== Current operations ===
The firm was sold to Robert Maxwell's Hollis Group in 1986. Following the collapse of Maxwell's empire a management buy out was undertaken in 1988. This failed and the company closed in 1989, with all works shutting down. Stothert & Pitt was purchased by NEI Ltd (Northern Engineering Industries) in 1989 and became part of the Clarke Chapman Group of Companies. Clarke Chapman was then subsequently sold to Rolls Royce. After several successful years Rolls Royce decided to concentrate on their core products and in 2000 Stothert & Pitt (Clarke Chapman) was sold to Langley Holdings.

Stothert & Pitt moved from Bath to Bristol in summer 2008 to the Bradman Lake offices on Yelverton Road in Brislington, Bristol. Bradman Lake moved again in 2019 to Unity Road, Keynsham taking Stothert & Pitt with them.

Stothert & Pitt offer spares and aftermarket support for all its dockside and offshore cranes currently in operation.

=== Former works ===
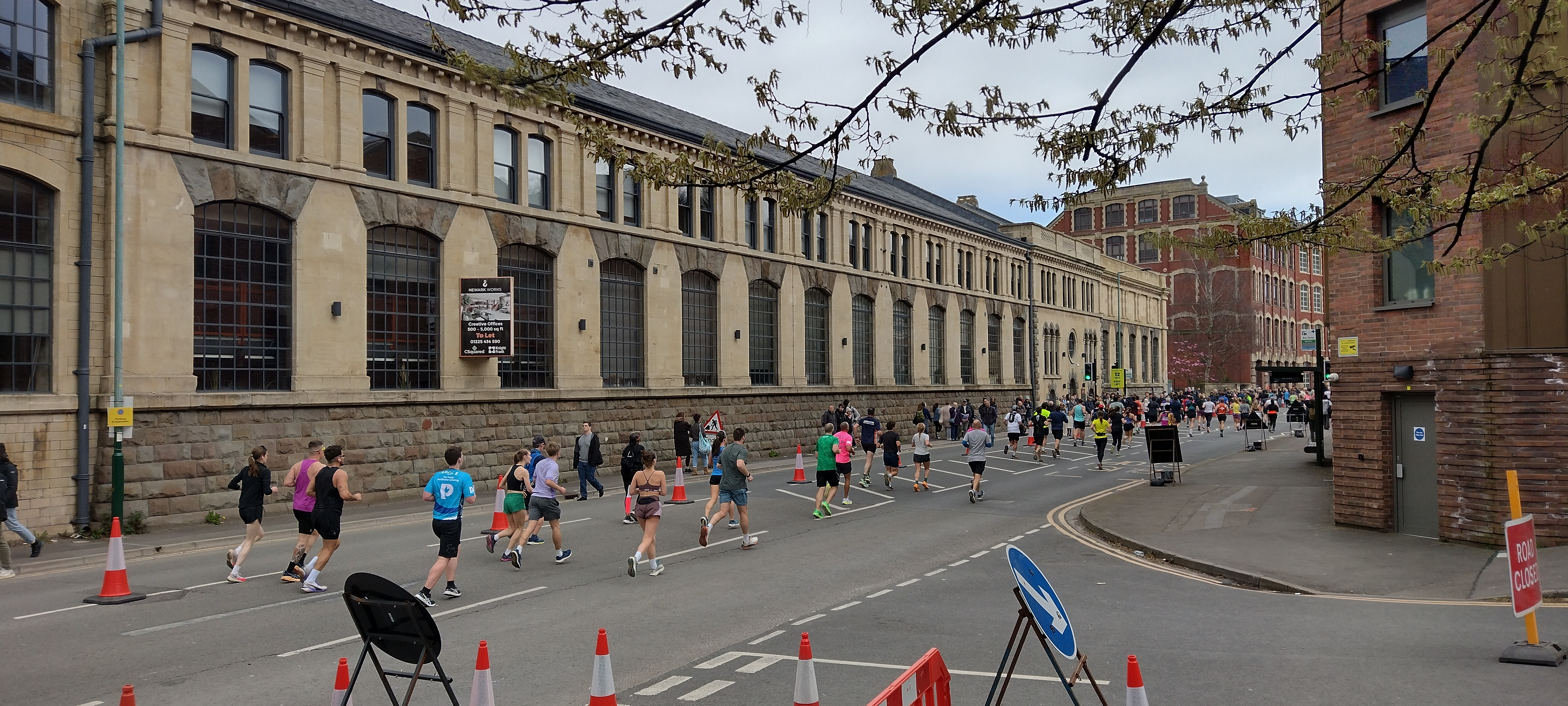
Bath half-marathon 2026 runners pass Stothert & Pitt's former Newark work site

Stothert & Pitt's former 40,000 square feet (3,700 m^{2}) Newark Works, now grade II listed, was converted in 2022 into flexible working space for small businesses as part of the Bath Quays development. Its larger site was developed from 2011 into the Bath Western Riverside residential scheme. TCN UK currently owns Newark Works and provides modern meeting rooms and office spaces to entrepreneurs and businesses in Bath. Newark Works now operates as a "creative hub" for local startups and technology companies.

== Model range ==
=== Construction machinery ===
- Pedestrian rollers
  - Vibroll 28W Roller
- Concrete mixers
  - "Victoria" mobile mixers
- Lorry-mounted concrete mixers
- Concrete batching plants
  - "Super 64" concrete mixer – used for runway construction
- No.16 Tarmacadam plant for the war office
- Cranes
  - Goliath type yard cranes
  - "Titan", a 50 ton block-setting cranes built in 1899 for building breakwaters at South Shields.

=== Other products ===
- Dock cranes
  - Container loaders from the 1970 onward
  - Goliath cranes for dock building
  - Electric dock cranes (some still preserved Bristol docks and also 12 Grade II listed dock cranes in Royal Victoria Dock in London)
  - DD2 Dock cranes, 5ton @ 80 ft, 5ton @ 100 ft, or 3 ton @ 65 ft versions.
- Shipyard cranes
  - Hammerhead cranes for Rosyth Dockyard, 120 ton max lift or 180 ft radius built 1965.
  - and HMNB Devonport in Plymouth, 1,450 tonnes of structure with a lift of 80 tonnes. Recently dismantled.
- Fire grates & household ironmongery merchants
- Offshore platform cranes (made up until closure of works)
- Pump units (now made by Albany Pumps)
- Railway breakdown cranes (Early 20th century)
- Ship cranes
  - Seaplane recovery cranes, for the Admiralty
- Scissor lifts (self propelled) introduced in the 1980s
- Winches
- Lifeboat davits, such as the gantry ones used on HMHS Britannic

== See also ==
- Aveling-Barford
- Joseph Day
- Clarke Chapman
- Northern Engineering Industries Ltd – (NEI)
- Albany Pumps
