= Chocolate Path =

Footpath in Bristol, England

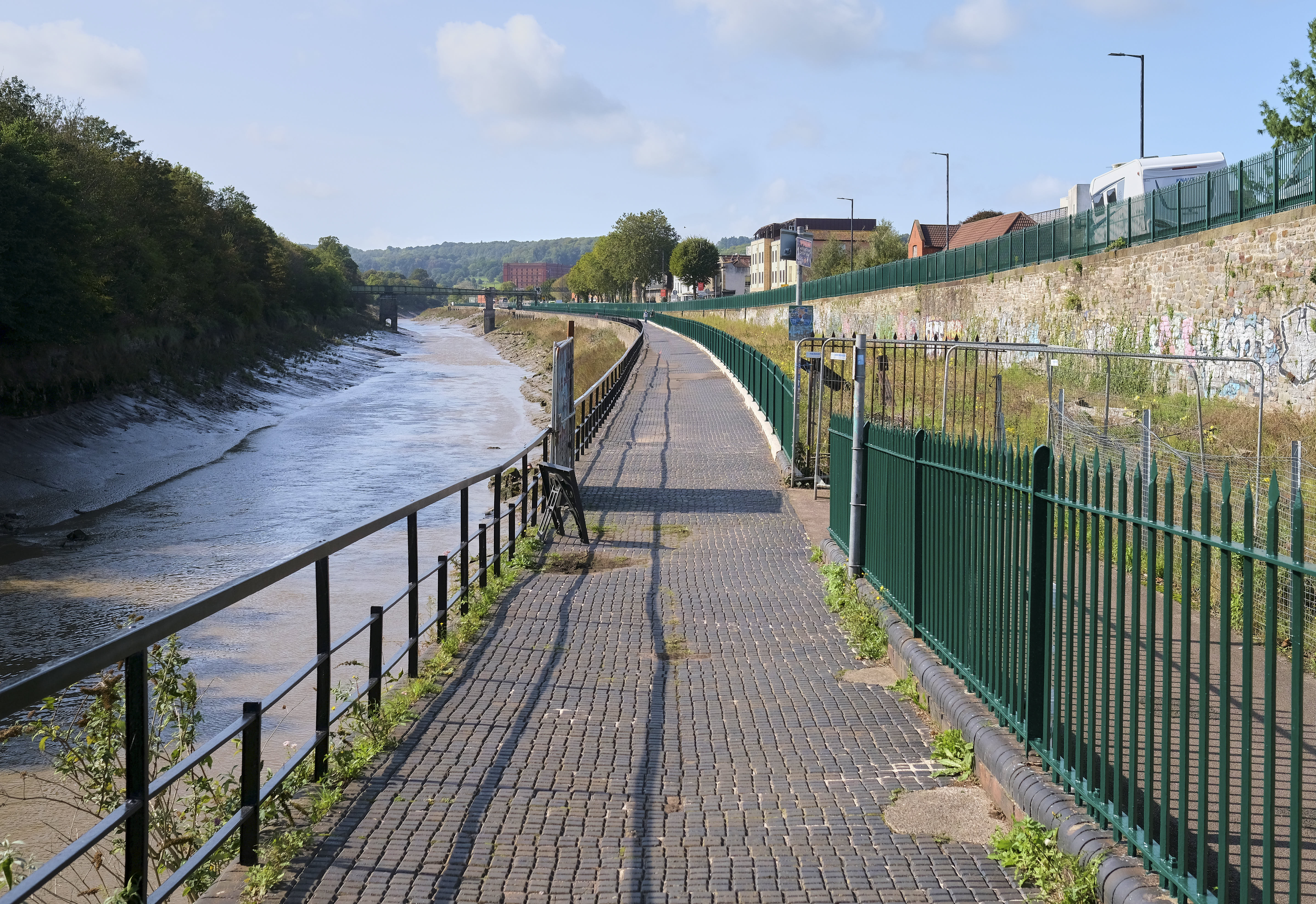
Looking westwards, showing the distinctive 'chocolate block' surface

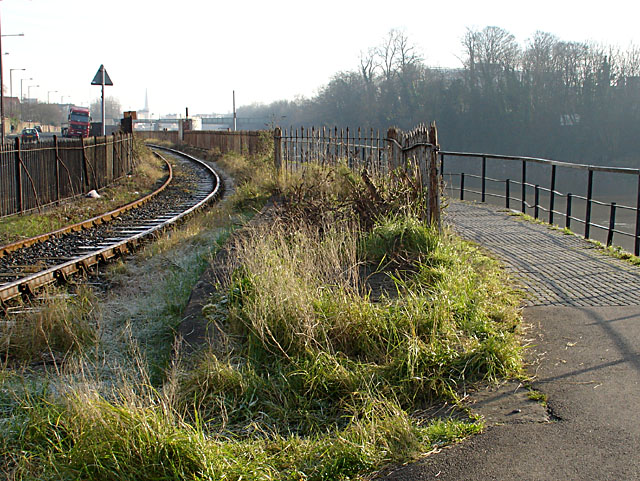
The western end of the path

The Chocolate Path is a walkway located in Bristol along the northern bank of the New Cut.

The path was closed on 24 June 2014 due to safety concerns following ground movements.

On 18 December 2017, a section of the path just under a mile long was closed due to safety concerns. £5 million was subsequently allocated for repairs. In September 2019, it was stated that the path would open in 2021 at the earliest and that repair costs had risen to £9 million. In January 2020, a larger part of the embankment collapsed into the river, resulting in the closure of the adjacent Cumberland Road.

The path was set to reopen in May 2023, though in April the Bristol mayor stated that it could be delayed further.

It was reopened in September 2023
