= Albany Pumps =

Albany Pumps are manufactured in Lydney, England by The Albany Engineering Company Limited. It manufactures pumps for industrial, petroleum, fire, and OEM markets.

== History ==
The Albany rotary gear pump was created in 1901 in the Old Kent Road area of South London in a small workshop controlled by R. White & Co. Mineral Water Manufacturers. This workshop and associated brass foundry had already existed for about 10 years. In 1904 a patent (No. 25,222)"Improvements in or relating to Rotary Pumps" was obtained following 3 years of supply of standard pumps. Throughout the years various improvements to gear pump design have led to other patents and product features being developed. Albany was located in London until the factory was destroyed on the third day of the Blitz in 1941. The firm's wartime wanderings included five years in farm buildings in Hitchin, Hertfordshire, before settling in the present 2 acre site at Lydney in Gloucestershires Forest of Dean (England) in 1946.

== Takeovers ==
Over the years Albany has undertaken to increase its product range by incorporating other pump companies, some of whose trade names are still used today.

1930s, Albany bought the centrifugal pump business of J. Stone of Deptford, London.
1974, Handoll Pump & Engineering Co. Ltd and Associated Pumps of Croydon, London.
1980, Brooke Tool Systems Limited of Birmingham was acquired along with Warwick Pumps.
1987, Barclay Kellet Pumps of Bradford
1988, Crown Pumps of Feltham, Middlesex
1992, Stanhope Pumps of Bradford
1999, Stothert & Pitt Pump division
2002, FF Pumps of Ireland
2015, Albany becomes an employee owned company

== Pump Manufacturing ==
The company continues to operate from its Lydney site, with a smaller manufacturing site at Bradford, England. The original gear pump design has been developed into modern and reliable machines capable of working for up to 100,000 hours on important lubrication duties. As well as Gear pumps, Albany produces Centrifugal Pumps, Lobe, and Twin Screw Pumps (based on Stothert & Pitt Design).

== Markets ==
Pumps are sold into a wide range of different markets. Gear pumps are sold for lubrication duties in gas turbines and air compressors. The oil and gas industry makes extensive use of gear and twin screw pumps. Pumps are supplied for every stage of the bitumen industry. Fuel oil transfer pumps are manufactured for use in a wide variety of industries. Gear pumps are supplied for foam concentrate use in the fire industry where the concentrate is mixed with the main flow of water. Pumps have been supplied to defense applications for more than 100 years.

== Stothert & Pitt Pumps ==
Stothert & Pitt commenced rotary lobe pump manufacture with a licence in 1919. Molasses and other viscous liquids were handled in heated pumps. Up until 1937, installed lobe pumps were still in use unloading molasses tank ships. A further licence to make twin screw pumps was acquired from Houttuin pumps of Utrecht, the Netherlands in 1935, with manufacturing starting in 1936. Just a few years later about 1100 twin screw pumps were supplied to the RAF for use in RAF stations all over the world during World War II. Stotherts were the leading in multiphase pump technology in the 1980s but the R&D expenditure did not lead to many pump sales and Stothert & Pitt, a company quoted on the London Stock Exchange, lost its independence and shut in 1989. In 1999 Albany took over the manufacture of Stothert & Pitt Twin Screw, Centrifugal and Lobe pumps.
