= Slewing =

Slewing is the rotation of an object around an axis, usually the z axis. An example is a radar scanning 360 degrees by slewing around the z axis. This is also common terminology in astronomy. The process of rotating a telescope to observe a different region of the sky is referred to as slewing.

The term slewing is also found in motion control applications. Often the slew axis is combined with another axis to form a motion profile.

In crane terminology, slewing is the angular movement of a crane boom or crane jib in a horizontal plane.

The term is also used in the computer game Microsoft Flight Simulator wherein the user presses a key and they can rotate and move the virtual aircraft along all three spatial planes.

In the modern day use of CNC programs, slewing is a vital part of the process.
