= Fire-float Pyronaut =

Historic fireboat in Bristol, England

Coordinates: 51°26′53″N 2°35′53″W

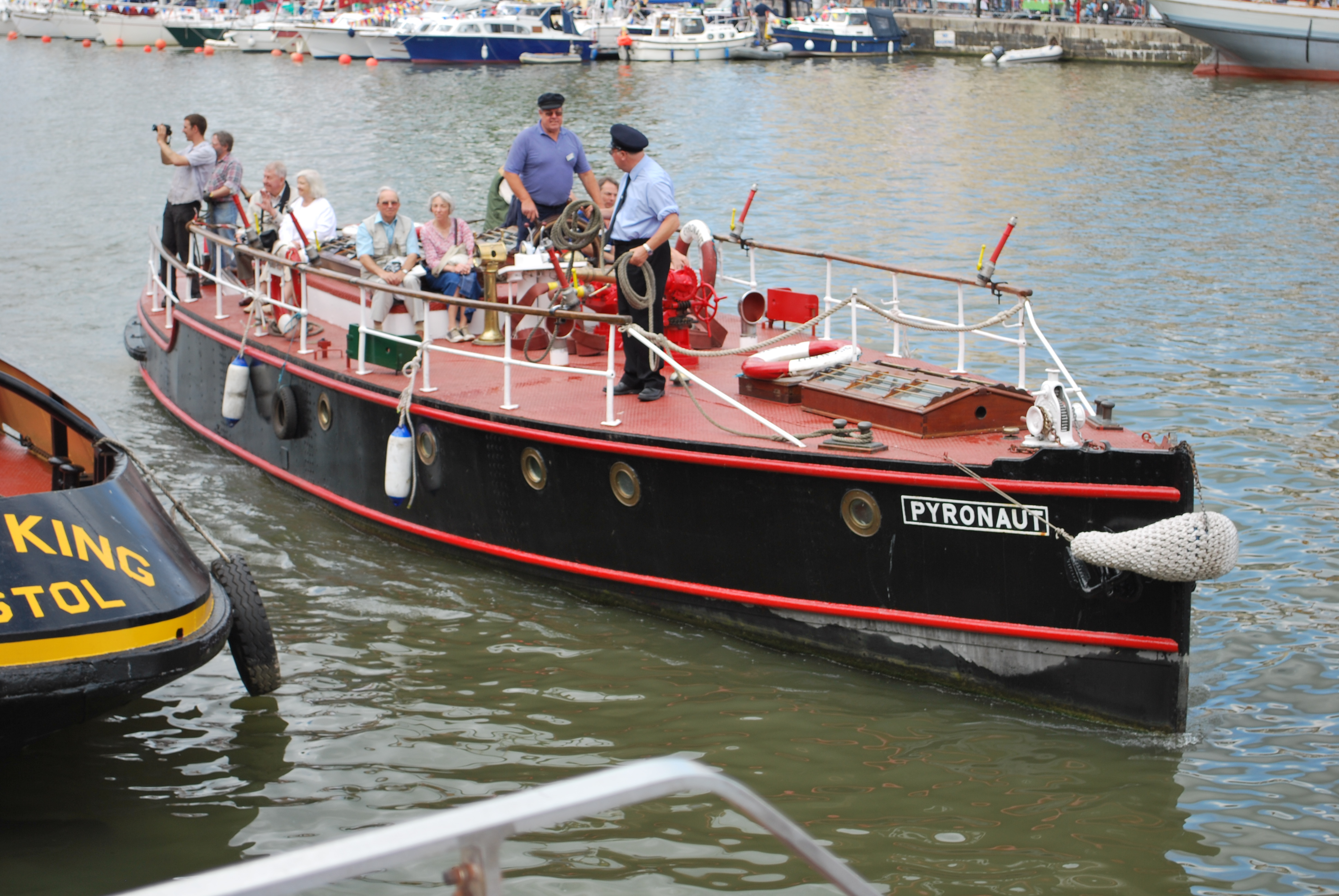
- Pyronaut approaching her berth at M Shed.

History

United Kingdom
- Builder: Charles Hill & Sons Ltd
- Launched: 1934
- Christened: Phoenix II
- In service: 1934
- Out of service: 1973
- Renamed: 1938
- Home port: Bristol
- Status: Museum ship in Bristol Harbour

General characteristics
- Tonnage: Registered: 8.46 tons; Gross: 20.32 tons
- Length: 55 ft (17 m)
- Beam: 13 ft (4.0 m)
- Draught: 3 ft (0.91 m)

Pyronaut (originally Bristol Phoenix II) is a specialised form of fireboat known as a fire-float. It was built in 1934 by Charles Hill & Sons Ltd., Albion Dock Bristol, Yard No. 208. Registered number 333833. She is owned by Bristol Museums and based at M Shed in Bristol's Floating Harbour.

Originally powered by two Petter Atomic diesel engines rates at 55 bhp (41 kW) each. Two Merryweather & Sons three-cylinder reciprocating pumps capable of delivering 500 imperial gallons (2,300 L; 600 US gal) of water per minute.

This equipment was replaced in 1968 by two Ruston & Hornsby 6YDM six-cylinder diesel engines rated at 90 bhp (67 kW) each, driving screw propellers from the front power-take-off, and Coventry Climax centrifugal pumps capable of delivering 1,000 imperial gallons (4,500 L; 1,200 US gal) of water per minute from the main drive.

== Fire-floats in Bristol ==
When ships loaded with valuable cargoes are berthed together in crowded docks surrounded by warehouses, a fire can be disastrous. Although land-based fire-engines are able to reach much of the fire ground, waterborne fire-engines, or fire-floats, can fight the fire from the water (outside the UK fire-floats are commonly known as fireboats).

The first recorded fire-float was built in 1765 for the Sun Fire Insurance Company in London. This was a manual pump in a small boat, rowed by its crew to the scene of the fire. A similar craft was built in Bristol by James Hilhouse for the Imperial Fire Insurance Office in the 1780s. All fire fighting in Bristol was carried out either by private insurance companies or the Docks Company until the formation of the Bristol Fire Brigade as a branch of the police in 1876.

By the middle of the nineteenth century, self-propelled steam-fire-floats were beginning to be introduced. The first to appear in Bristol was the Fire Queen, built by Shand Mason & Co., London, in 1884 for service in Bristol City Docks. The 53-foot (16 m) long craft was equipped with a three-cylinder steam-pump supplying two large hose reels; one of these was replaced with a monitor, or water-cannon, in 1900. Fire Queen served until 1922.

In 1905, the Fire Brigade took delivery of the Salamander, built by G.K. Stothert & Co., Hotwells, Bristol, and equipped with Merryweather pumps and two monitors. Salamander served at Avonmouth Docks for many years. She demonstrated the major drawback of steam-powered fire-floats one day in 1917: a fire was discovered at 7:30 a.m. in a transit shed at Avonmouth Dock, and Salamander was called out. By 8:30 am shore appliances had almost extinguished the fire. Meanwhile, Salamander had finally raised sufficient steam to lend a hand, and arrived at 8:36 a.m.

As well as the two specialised craft, a number of craft owned by the Port Authority were fitted with fire-fighting equipment. These included the tug/tender Brunel, and the multi-purpose workboat Bulldog. The Port also owned and operated the fire-float Denny, built in 1916 for service at Portishead Dock. Denny served until 1953.

In 1921, Fire Queen was replaced as the City Docks' fire-float by Phoenix, built in London and petrol-engined. Ten years later, the Fire Brigade reconsidered their requirements in the Port of Bristol. The cost of installing diesel engines in Salamander was investigated, but proved too expensive to be worthwhile, and instead the Brigade ordered two new fire-floats, one for Avonmouth and one for the City Docks. Charles Hill & Sons Ltd., Albion Dockyard, Bristol, successfully tendered for both. In 1934 the Bristol Phoenix II (later renamed Pyronaut) was launched, followed in 1936 by Endres Gane.

Bristol Phoenix II was taken into commission in June 1934, working from the Prince Street Bridge river police station. Her crew consisted of three firemen, including an engineer stationed below in the noisy engine room. He responded to orders transmitted from the wheel by the ship's telegraph, and controlled the speed and direction of each engine and watched over the pumps at the fire.

Surviving records show that in her first two years at work Bristol Phoenix II attended major fires at Robbins Ltd., Imperial Saw Mills, Cumberland Road (now part of the Baltic Wharf housing estate) Charles Hill & Sons Ltd.'s shipyard and William Butler's tar distillation works at Crew's Hole, Bristol. These sites were at opposite ends of the City Docks, almost five miles apart, and to allow the fire-float to reach the fire quickly, it was important that she should be able to pass under Prince Street swing bridge (the lowest in the Docks) without the bridge opening. This limitation meant that the fire-float's air-draught (the hull and superstructure above the waterline) was very low, and the helmsman had to lie flat on the deck when navigating some of the bridges.

In 1938, it was discovered that a second vessel named Phoenix appeared on the Bristol Ship Register, and, because this is not permitted, the fire-float was renamed Pyronaut (a name thought up by the teenage son of the Chairman of the Watch Committee). Shortly after this, in November 1938, one of the most serious peacetime fires in the City Docks broke out, at Samuel Thompson & Sons' malthouse (later known as the MacArthur warehouse) in Gas Ferry Road. The fire raged through the building, causing £46,000 of damage before it was extinguished by Pyronaut and several shore appliances.

== World War II ==
Early in 1939 several small fires at various places in the City Docks preceded a major fire at the Cumberland Road premises of the Anglo-American Asphalt Co. In the following year, Pyronaut embarked upon her busiest period, as the air raids of the Bristol Blitz damaged and destroyed countless warehouses, factories, shops and homes around the Floating Harbour. Operating alongside two motor-launches fitted with fire-fighting equipment, Pyronaut was constantly manned and working through the worst raids of the war.

== Peacetime service ==
The return to peacetime duties meant less work for the fire-floats, but major fires still occurred. In February 1948 there was a serious blaze at the Hippodrome Theatre, and Pyronaut pumped water from the head of St Augustine's Reach. It was the height of the pantomime season, and amongst the salvage was some of the clothing for the cast, including Sid Phasey's dress suit. A reporter recorded the scene: ‘I find clusters of men soaked to the skin, their eyes red-rimmed with the smoke and fumes, plying their hoses oblivious to the danger that threatened them every minute from above’.

In 1949, a serious fire in wastepaper stacks at St. Anne's Board Mill required the attendance of Pyronaut and many shore appliances, as well as the company’s own motor-launch fire-float. When Rowe Bros' lead works warehouses on Canons' Marsh caught fire in 1950, Pyronaut pumped water from the City Docks. In September 1951, the most serious peacetime oil fire to date broke out at Avonmouth Docks, and Pyronaut made the journey down the River Avon to attend; she pumped water continually for two days. The following year saw her fighting a dangerous fire aboard the m.v. Stalheim in the city docks.

In quieter moments, the crew regularly took Pyronaut for drill periods, to familiarise themselves with the equipment and performance of the craft. A favourite destination during drill was Beese's Tea Garden at Conham.

== Closure of Bristol City Docks ==
By 1967, the equipment of Pyronaut and Endres Gane was becoming worn out and obsolete. A new fire-float for Avonmouth Docks, the Aquanaut, was ordered from Thames Launch Works Ltd., London, and delivered in 1969. Powered by twin Thornycroft diesel engines driving Schottel propulsion units, the new craft was very manoeuvrable, and her Rolls-Royce turbocharged pumps allowed her to deliver 2,000 imperial gallons (9,100 L; 2,400 US gal) of water per minute through hoses and four monitors; additionally, she carried large tanks for foam which was discharged through a fifth, dual-purpose, monitor. Aquanaut replaced the Endres Gane, which was sold into private hands; she can still be seen acting as a storage hulk in the city docks.

Instead of buying a new fire-float for the city docks, it was decided to re-equip Pyronaut, and this was carried out in 1968 to 1969, at Charles Hill's. Her Petter Atomic diesel engines and Merryweather reciprocating pumps were replaced with Ruston & Hornsby diesels. These were installed with the normal drive facing forwards, so that the full power of the engines could be applied to the new Coventry Climax centrifugal pumps, and yet still provide sufficient power from the auxiliary end of the engines to drive the screws. At the same time, remote controls of the engine from the steering position was introduced, so that it was no longer necessary to station an engineer in the engine room at all times.

== 1972 review ==
Despite these improvements, Pyronaut's working days were numbered. In 1969, the decision to close Bristol City Docks to commercial traffic by 1975 was announced and a review of the fire cover in the city docks in 1972 noted that very few buildings remained which could not be reached on all sides by land-based fire-engines. Consequently, Pyronaut was put up for sale in 1973. Seven years later Aquanaut was also sold, and fire cover in the Avonmouth and Royal Portbury Docks became the responsibility of land-based fire appliances and new tugs equipped with fire-fighting equipment.

Pyronaut was sold to the Port of Bristol Authority, who took her to Avonmouth and began work on converting her into a divers' boat. This entailed removing all the fire-fighting pumps and moving her engines forward in the hull to create space for a changing room. The work was never completed, and she was sold again to a private owner in 1983, who began to fit out the changing room as a saloon, with the intention of using Pyronaut as a working/living craft in the south of Ireland. Shortly before completing the work in 1989, he decided to sell the vessel to Bristol City Museum and Art Gallery, based at the now-closed Bristol Industrial Museum where restoration and preservation was completed in 1995. Pyronaut can now be seen outside the new M Shed museum, berthed with the museum‘s tugs Mayflower and John King. Listed as part of the National Historic Fleet, she performs displays during major harbour events as well as operating for trips on some summer weekends. In June 2012 she travelled to London by road to take part in the Queen's Diamond Jubilee Pageant.

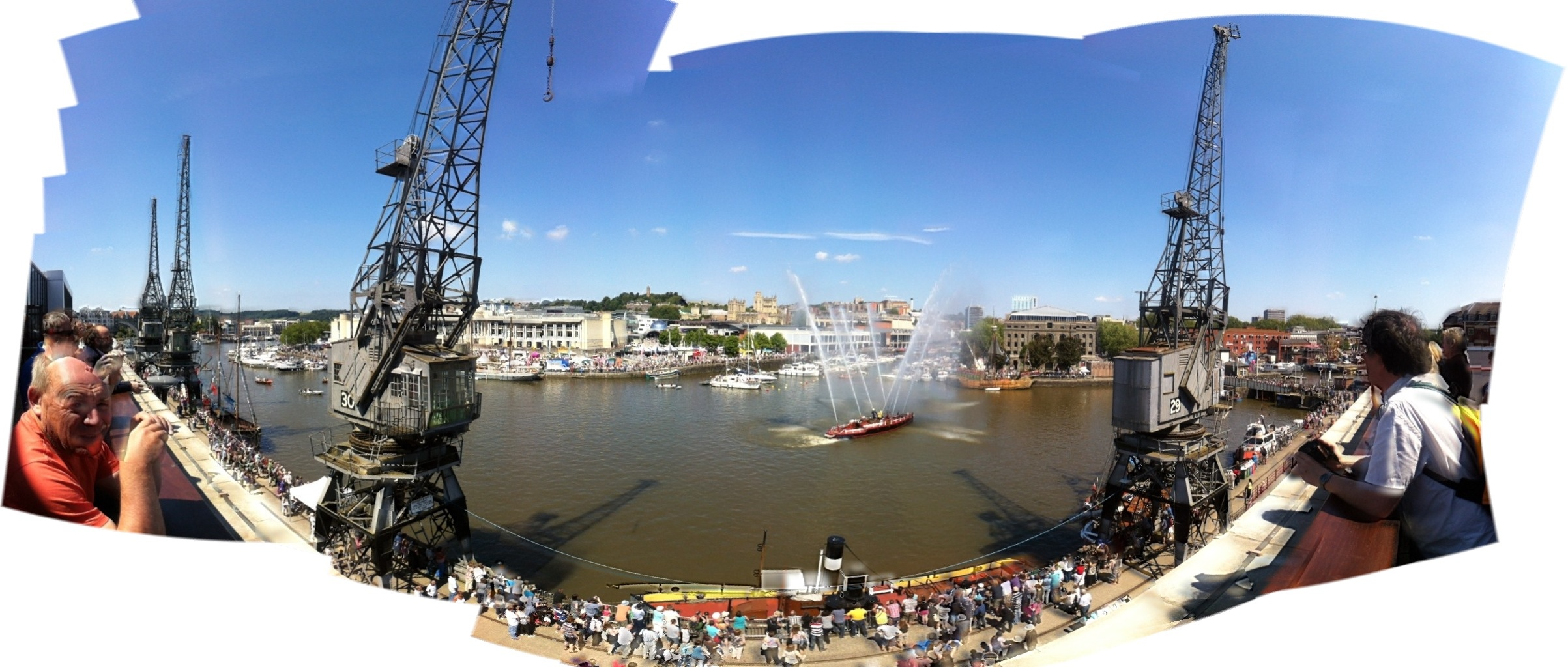
The Pyronaut on display at the Bristol Harbour Festival
