= Resolute (tugboat) =

Tug (tugboat) built in Bristol in 1897

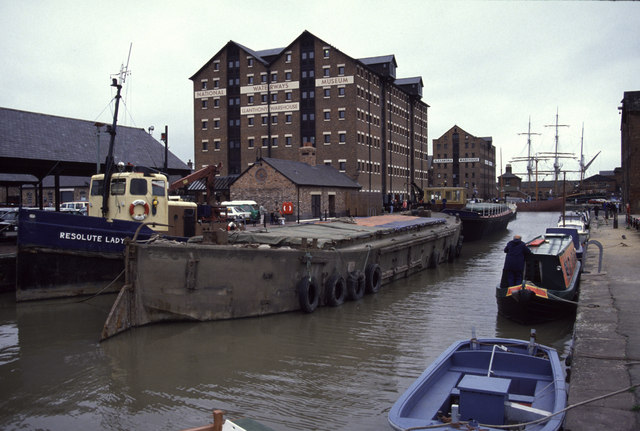

History

United Kingdom
- Name: Resolute
- Port of registry: Gloucester
- Builder: G.K. Stothert & Co
- Launched: 5 July 1897
- In service: 1897
- Out of service: 2010
- Refit: 1956
- Identification: UK official number 105415
- Status: Scrapped

General characteristics
- Type: Steam tug/Diesel tug
- Tonnage: 62 GRT
- Length: 67.1 ft (20.5 m)
- Beam: 15.9 ft (4.8 m)
- Depth: 8.4 ft (2.6 m)
- Installed power: 32 nhp, 300ihp (Steam engine) 350bhp (Diesel engine)
- Propulsion: Compound steam engine / Diesel engine

Resolute was a tugboat built in Bristol in 1897. She had a service life of over 100 years, most of which was spent working on the lower reaches of the River Severn and in the Bristol Channel whilst based at Gloucester and Sharpness. She was registered on the National Register of Historic Vessels until disposal in 2010.

== Building ==
Resolute was built by G.K. Stothert & Co. The tug had a steel hull. As built, she was 67.1 ft (20.5 m) long, her beam was 15.9 ft (4.8 m), her depth was 8.4 ft (2.6 m) and her tonnage was 62 GRT. She was initially fitted with a condensing steam compound engine and boiler built by Stothert. Some of the components (including the propeller and funnel hinge system) were designed by the purchaser. Her UK official number was 105415, and she was first registered in January 1904.

== Service ==
Resolute was built for the Severn & Canal Carrying Company. She was one of two tugs built to the same design, the other being Reliance. The two were built to replace two earlier tugs, Enterprise and Gem. Resolute was launched in July 1897, with Reliance following in October. They were employed on the River Severn, towing both S&CCC vessels and those of other carriers.

By 1903, the Severn & Canal Carrying Company was in financial difficulty and sold both Resolute and Reliance. Concerns about the vessels having too great a draft for their intended purpose may also have been a factor, as they were replaced by the smaller Stothert built Victor and Active the following year. Reliance was sold to the Bordeaux based import/export company J.A. Delmas and used by them at Dakar. Resolute was sold for £950 to the Sharpness New Docks and Gloucester and Birmingham Navigation Company, and used by them to fulfil a contract they entered into with John Aird & Co. to tow gravel barges from Frampton to Avonmouth as part of the Royal Edward Dock construction works. The gravel contract ended in 1907, and Resolute was then used to tow vessels into Sharpness Docks, replacing smaller tugs including Mayflower and working alongside the new tug Primrose. She essentially retained this role until 1970.

From 1947 until 1965, Resolute was also used to beach redundant vessels at Purton to reinforce the river banks. With the Dock Company being nationalised after World War 2, ownership transferred to the British Transport Commission during March 1949. Between March 1956 and March 1957, Resolute was substantially rebuilt and fitted with a Ruston & Hornsby 6VEBM diesel engine. Along with the other Gloucester tugs, ownership of Resolute transferred over from the BTC to British Waterways in 1963.

With the nature of the traffic changing and more modern tugs being purchased, British Waterways sold Resolute to F.A. Ashmead & Son during 1970. Resolute was renamed Thelm Leigh and set to work alongside Peter Leigh (the former C.J. King tug John King) on the River Severn towing West African hardwood logs from Avonmouth to Lydney for veneer making. This work ended in March 1977. Around Christmas 1977, Thelm Leigh sank at Avonmouth; she was raised in mid January 1978.

Upon raising, she was sold to F.C. Larkham & Son, who renamed her Resolute Lady. During the early 1990s she was used in support of the drilling rigs used for ground testing prior to the construction of the Prince of Wales Bridge.

F.C. Larkham retained her until 2001, at which time she was purchased by John Rhodes who intended to preserve her. However, Resolute Lady was scrapped at Bullo Pill in 2010.
