= Sabrina 6 (barge) =

Sabrina 6 is a dumb barge, built in 1944 by Charles Hill & Sons of Bristol for the Ministry of War Transport. She was one of six 90 foot long unpowered barges called Sabrina that were built to be towed by a tug with the ability to quickly distribute cargo inland.

She is built from steel and has never had an engine, her length is 90 feet and her beam is 18 feet, her gross tonnage is about 90 tons.

In 1948 she was taken over from the Ministry of War Transport by British Waterways who operated and owned her until 1985 when she was purchased by Bristol Cruising Club as an unseaworthy wreck. She was subsequently restored and has been used as their Club Boat ever since.

She is registered as an Historic Ship on the British National Historic Ships Register (number 3482). Her sister ship Sabrina 5 is also registered on the National Historic Ships Register.
