= John King (tugboat) =

Diesel tug (tugboat) built in Bristol in 1935

Coordinates: 51.44793°N 2.59824°W

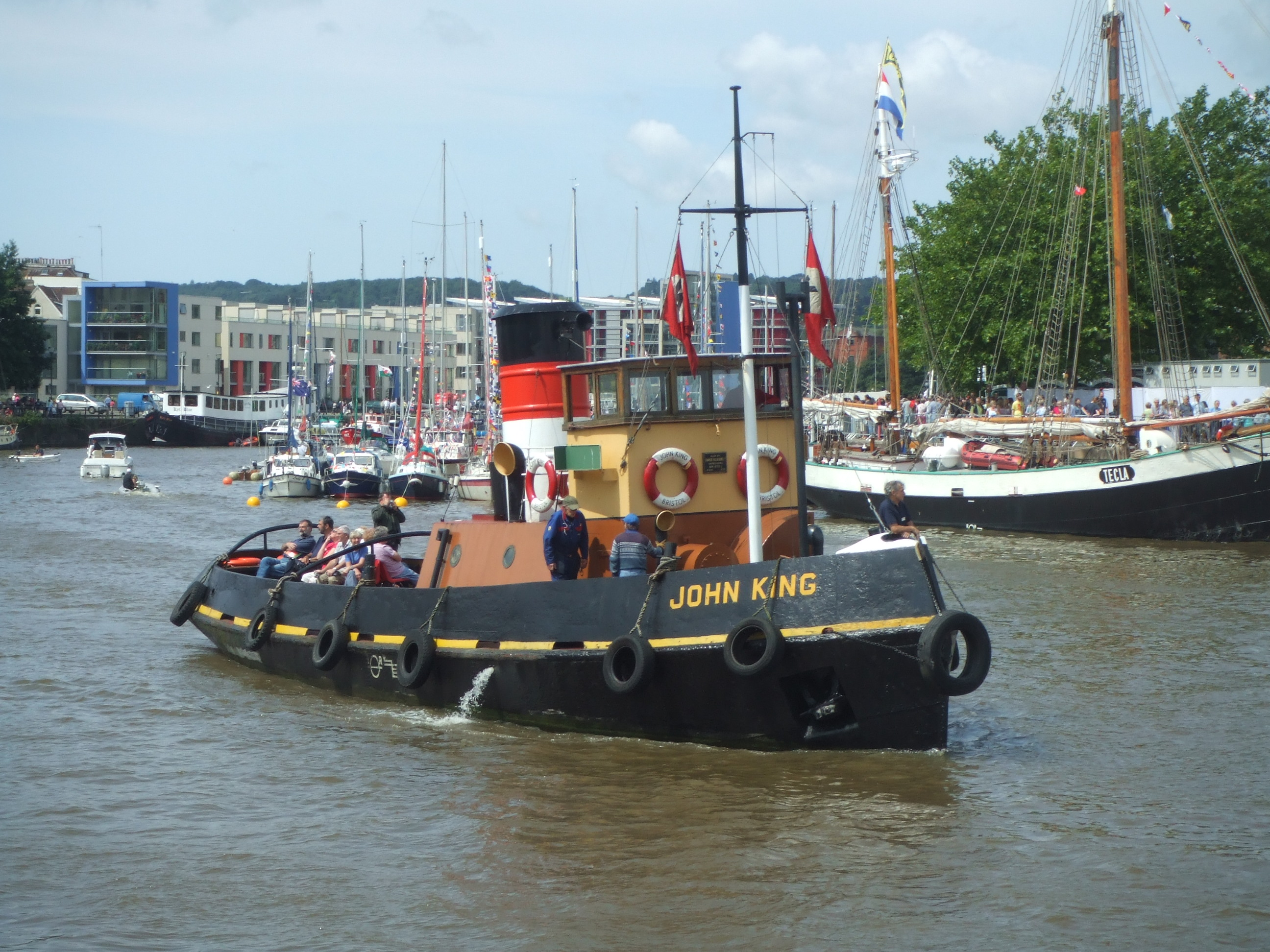

History

United Kingdom
- Name: John King
- Port of registry: Bristol
- Builder: Charles Hill & Sons Ltd
- Launched: 1935
- In service: 1935
- Out of service: 1994
- Identification: UK official number 163865
- Status: Museum ship in Bristol Harbour

General characteristics
- Type: Diesel tug
- Tonnage: 49 GRT
- Length: 65.0 ft (19.8 m)
- Beam: 17.0 ft (5.2 m)
- Depth of hold: 7.1 ft (2.2 m)
- Installed power: 337hp

John King is a diesel tug built in Bristol in 1935 and now preserved by Bristol Museums Galleries & Archives. She is based in Bristol Harbour at M Shed (formerly Bristol Industrial Museum).

== Building ==
John King was built by Charles Hill & Sons Ltd.

The tug has a steel hull. She is 65.0 ft long, her beam is 17.0 ft, her depth is 7.1 ft and her gross tonnage is 49. Her United Kingdom official number is 163865.

== Service ==
John King was built for C.J. King and Sons Limited. She was the second diesel engined tug built for them after the Volunteer, completed in 1934. She was launched on 21 October 1935 and handed over on 15 November. She was used to tow ships to and from the City Docks until the requirements declined as trade moved to Avonmouth.

Her original Petter engine was replaced by a Lister Blackstone unit in 1962.

Her last job for her original owners was to tow the SS Great Britain from Avonmouth to the City Docks on 6 July 1970, and then to move it into Great Western Dockyard on 19 July.

She was sold to F.A. Ashmead & Son in September 1970 and renamed Peter Leigh before commencing work (alongside the former Gloucester based tug Resolute, which had been renamed Thelm Leigh) on the River Severn towing West African hardwood logs from Avonmouth to Lydney for veneer making. This work ended in March 1977.

During 1978, she was sold again and purchased by Bristol Commercial Ships. She as renamed twice (first as Pride in 1978, and then Durdham in 1986) and was based in Bristol whilst undertaking a variety of duties.

== Preservation ==
During 1995 she was purchased by Bristol Museums. She reverted to her original name and was restored to the appearance she had when working for C.J. King and Sons.

The tug now carries visitors on trips in Bristol Harbour, alongside her fellow vessels Mayflower and Pyronaut.
