= Meander (1855) =

History

- Name: SS Meander
- Owner: James Moss & Co., Liverpool
- Builder: Stothert and Fripp, Bristol
- Laid down: 1854
- Launched: 23 December 1854
- Completed: 1856
- Fate: Chartered to the French Government, 1856
- Name: SS Meandre
- Operator: French Government
- Acquired: 1856
- Fate: Returned to James Moss & Co., 1856

- Name: SS Meander
- Namesake: SS Meandre
- Owner: Bibby Line
- Acquired: 1857
- Fate: Sold, 1868
- Name: SS Baron Lambermont
- Owner: Cie Generale Maritime, Antwerp
- Acquired: 1868
- Fate: Sold, 1877
- Name: SS Orient
- Owner: E. Caillol et H. Saint-Pierre, Marseille
- Acquired: 1877
- Fate: Broken up, 1910

General characteristics
- Type: Passenger ship
- Tonnage: 622 nrt, 974 grt (as built), 1023 grt (1885)
- Length: 239 ft (73 m)
- Beam: 27.66 ft (8.43 m)
- Draft: 19.03 ft (5.80 m)
- Installed power: 200 hp
- Propulsion: 2 cyl. Oscillating Engine (Stotherts)
- Speed: 8.0 knots
- Capacity: 10 passengers; 700 troops (as troop ship)

The SS Meander was an iron screw passenger steamship built for James Moss & Co. of Liverpool for the Moss Line. She was launched on 23 December 1854 by the Bristol yard of Stothert and Fripp. She had two sisterships built at the same shipyard, the Scamander and Araxes.

== History ==
Soon after completion, James Moss & Co. chartered the Meander with both her sisterships to the French Government for use as troopships in the Crimean War. G.K. Stothert visited Crimea himself before Meander arrived (between August and October 1855 - possibly arriving aboard the Araxes), at one point visiting his brother who was Chaplain to the Naval Brigade aboard HMS Queen.

She was renamed Meandre and returned after the Crimean War ended in February 1856.

She was purchased by Bibby Line the following year and reverted to her original name, although she was still referred to by the French and Lloyds Register as the Meandre. After a decade of service she was sold in 1868 to Cie Generale Maritime of Antwerp and renamed Baron Lambermont for operating out of Belgium. She again changed hands in 1877 when she was acquired by E. Caillol et H. Saint-Pierre of Marseille and was renamed Orient.

Caillol & Saint-Pierre operated her on the Marseille to Corsica service carrying 10 passengers and 700 troops in the 'tween decks. She was refitted in 1885, when the engine was replaced with a compound engine by Fraissenet & Cie of Marseille, increasing her tonnage to 1023 grt. This enabled her operation into the 20th century, but by late in her career she was relegated to a cargo ship, operating to Algeria. Meander was eventually broken up in Marseille in 1910.

She is subject of a print entitled "Launch of the HMS Meander, from the Clifton Works, Bristol, 1855", although she never served in the Royal Navy.
