= Gloucester and Sharpness Canal =

Canal in Gloucestershire, England

Coordinates: 51°44′N 2°29′W

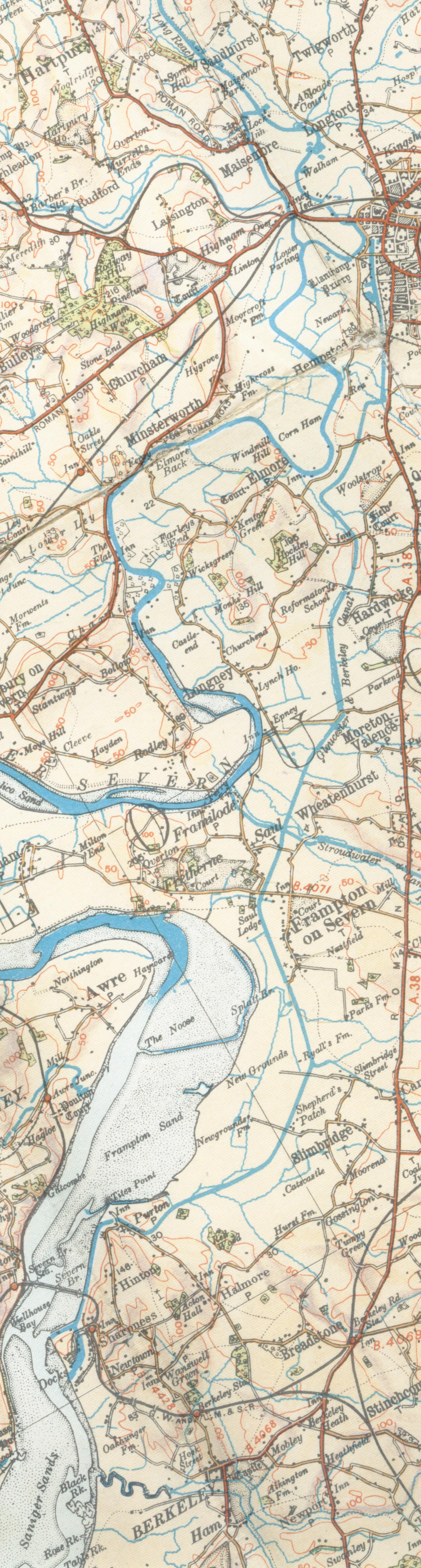
1933 map: the canal is the thin blue line from Gloucester (upper right) to Sharpness (lower left)

The Gloucester and Sharpness Canal (also known as the Gloucester and Berkeley Canal) is a ship canal in the west of England, between Gloucester and Sharpness, completed in 1827. For much of its length the canal runs close to the tidal River Severn, but it cuts off a long loop in the river at a once-dangerous bend near Arlingham. It was once the broadest and deepest canal in the world. The canal is 26.5 km (16.5 miles) long.

== Canal planning and construction ==
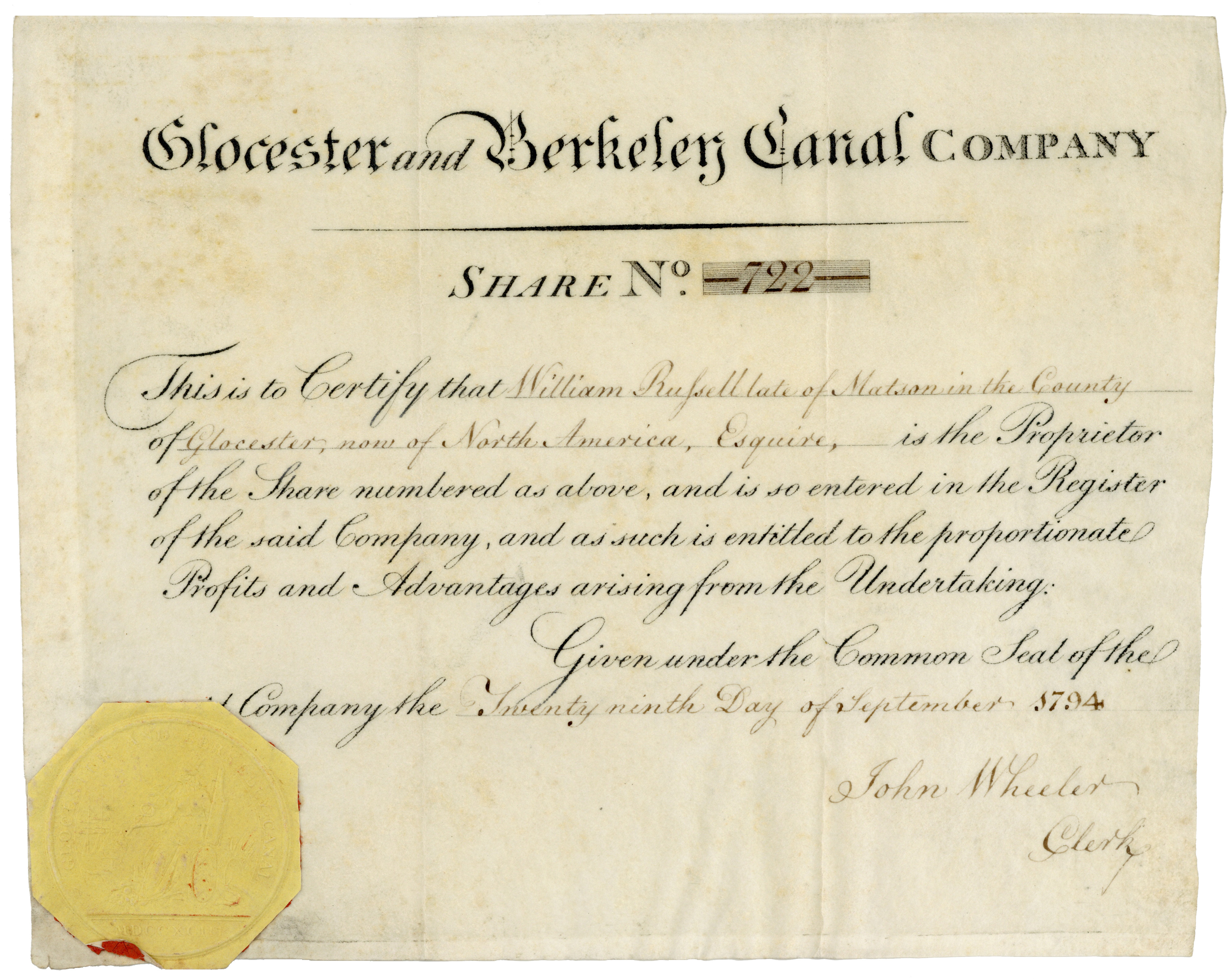
Founder's share of the Glocester and Berkeley Canal Company, issued 29 September 1794, printed on vellum. The proprietors of this canal were authorised to raise the sum of £140,000 to be divided into shares of £100 each. If the former sum be insufficient, they could raise a further sum of £60,000.

Gloucester and Berkeley Canal Act 1793
- Act of Parliament
- Parliament of Great Britain
- Long title: An Act for making and maintaining a Navigable Canal from the River Severn, at or near the City of Gloucester, into a Place called Berkeley Pill, in the Parish of Berkeley, and also a Cut to or near the Town of Berkeley, in the County of Gloucester.
- Citation: 33 Geo. 3. c. 97
- Territorial extent: Great Britain

Dates
- Royal assent: 28 March 1793
- Commencement: 13 December 1792 (Note: Start of session.)
Other legislation
Amended by	Gloucester and Berkeley Canal Act 1805; Gloucester and Berkeley Canal Act 1818

Status: Amended

Text of statute as originally enacted

Conceived in the canal mania period of the late 18th century, the Gloucester and Berkeley Ship Canal scheme (as it was originally named) was started by architect and civil engineer Robert Mylne. An act of Parliament, the Gloucester and Berkeley Canal Act 1793 (33 Geo. 3. c. 97) was obtained, authorising the raising of a total of £200,000. The project rapidly encountered financial difficulties, to such an extent that Mylne left the project in 1798.

By mid-1799 costs had reached £112,000 but only 5 1/2 miles (9 km) of the canal had been completed. Mylne's role was taken over by James Dadford, who had originally been engaged as resident engineer on the project in 1795. Lack of funds resulted in the company ceasing to employ Dadford in 1800.

=== Decade of capital raising ===
Between 1800 and 1810 various unfruitful attempts were made to raise money to allow further building. Money from tolls and rents allowed for some improvements to be made to the basin at Gloucester in 1813.

=== Eventual completion ===
Following the Public Works Loans Act 1817 (57 Geo. 3. c. 34), it was possible for the company to borrow money from the Exchequer Bill Loan Commission. This, along with further share issues, provided enough money to bring the scheme to completion. After these significant delays, the canal opened in April 1827. In the course of its construction the canal had cost £440,000 (equivalent to £40,000,000 in 2025). As opened, the canal was 86 1/2 feet (26.4 m) wide, 18 feet (5.5 m) deep and could take craft of up to 600 long tons (610 tonnes; 670 short tons). The longer of the two locks onto the canal proper was 115 feet (35 m) long.

=== Tracking ===
In the early years of the canal, with the use of sails being prohibited or significantly limited, tracking (towing) of vessels was undertaken using horses provided by a succession of tracking agents appointed by the canal company. During May 1858, the canal company permitted the carrying company of Danks, Venn and Sanders to use their Stothert-built screw tug Pioneer for tracking on the canal. By November 1859 the canal company were undertaking their own trials using a rented tug (Reindeer, owned by J. M. Hyde of Bristol). This was successful, and shortly thereafter they ordered their tracking agent Timothy Hadley to place an order for two steam tugs; these were Moss Rose (1860) and Mayflower (1861) with a third (Violet, 1862) following on shortly after. The use of horses was significantly reduced as a result, and other tugs followed.

=== Eventual dividends ===
By the middle of the 19th century it proved possible to pay a small dividend, the debt to the Exchequer Bill Loan Commission having been repaid with the help of a loan of £60,000 from the Pelican Life Assurance Company. In 1871 the last of the debts incurred in the course of funding the canal, including the Pelican loan, were paid off.

=== Sharpness New Docks ===
Gloucester and Berkeley Canal Act 1874 (Note: Section 1.)
- Act of Parliament
- Parliament of the United Kingdom
- Long title: An Act for vesting in the Gloucester and Berkeley Canal Company the Undertaking of the Company of Proprietors of the Worcester and Birmingham Canal Navigation; and for other purposes.
- Citation: 37 & 38 Vict. c. clxxxi
- Territorial extent: United Kingdom

Dates
- Royal assent: 30 July 1874
- Commencement: 30 July 1874 (Note: The Acts of Parliament (Commencement) Act 1793.)

Status: Current legislation

Text of statute as originally enacted

A new, larger entrance and tidal basin at Sharpness was completed in 1874; during this year the Gloucester and Berkeley Canal Company acquired the Worcester and Birmingham Canal Company by the Gloucester and Berkeley Canal Act 1874 (37 & 38 Vict. c. clxxxi), and the tugs from Timothy Hadley. At this point, the canal company was renamed the Sharpness New Docks and Gloucester and Birmingham Navigation Company.

Where the Severn Railway Bridge (completed in 1879) passed over the canal, a swing section was constructed to avoid restricting headroom.

=== Purton hulks ===
In 1909, following a collapse in the bank of the river, the canal company's chief engineer A. J. Cullis called for old vessels to be run aground along the bank of the Severn, near Purton, to create a makeshift tidal erosion barrier to reinforce the narrow strip of land between the river and canal. Barges, trows and schooners were "hulked" at high tide, and have since filled with silt. More boats have been added, including the schooner Katherine Ellen which was impounded in 1921 for running guns to the IRA, the Kennet barge Harriett, and ferrocement barges built in World War II.

In 1999, Paul Barnett started a privately funded research project to record the 81 vessels at the site, recognised as the largest ships' graveyard in mainland Britain. In 2010 British Waterways took control of the site in an attempt to protect it.

=== Bridge-houses ===
Eight of the bridges have Neo-classical bridge-men's houses in the near vicinity. These were built in the early 19th century when the volume of traffic on the canal made it important that all the bridges could open at night so that vessels could meet the tides at Sharpness. At that time, the other bridge-men lived in existing houses that were close enough to their bridges.

The classical-style bridge-men's houses were originally symmetrical in plan with gables on each elevation. Each had a living room, one bedroom, a scullery at the back and a porch with Doric columns at the front. In later years, the houses were extended to provide more accommodation and modern facilities. Today, the houses are in private ownership, and most of them are Grade II listed.

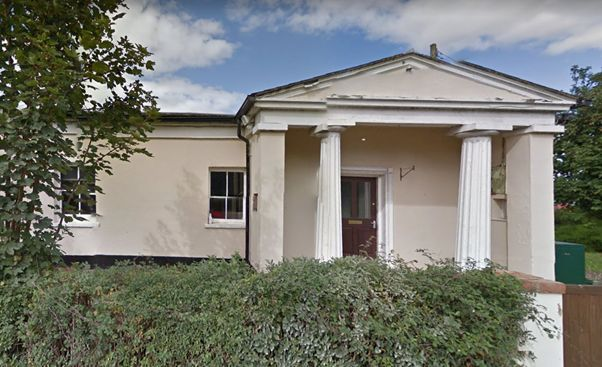
Rea Bridge Bridge-house

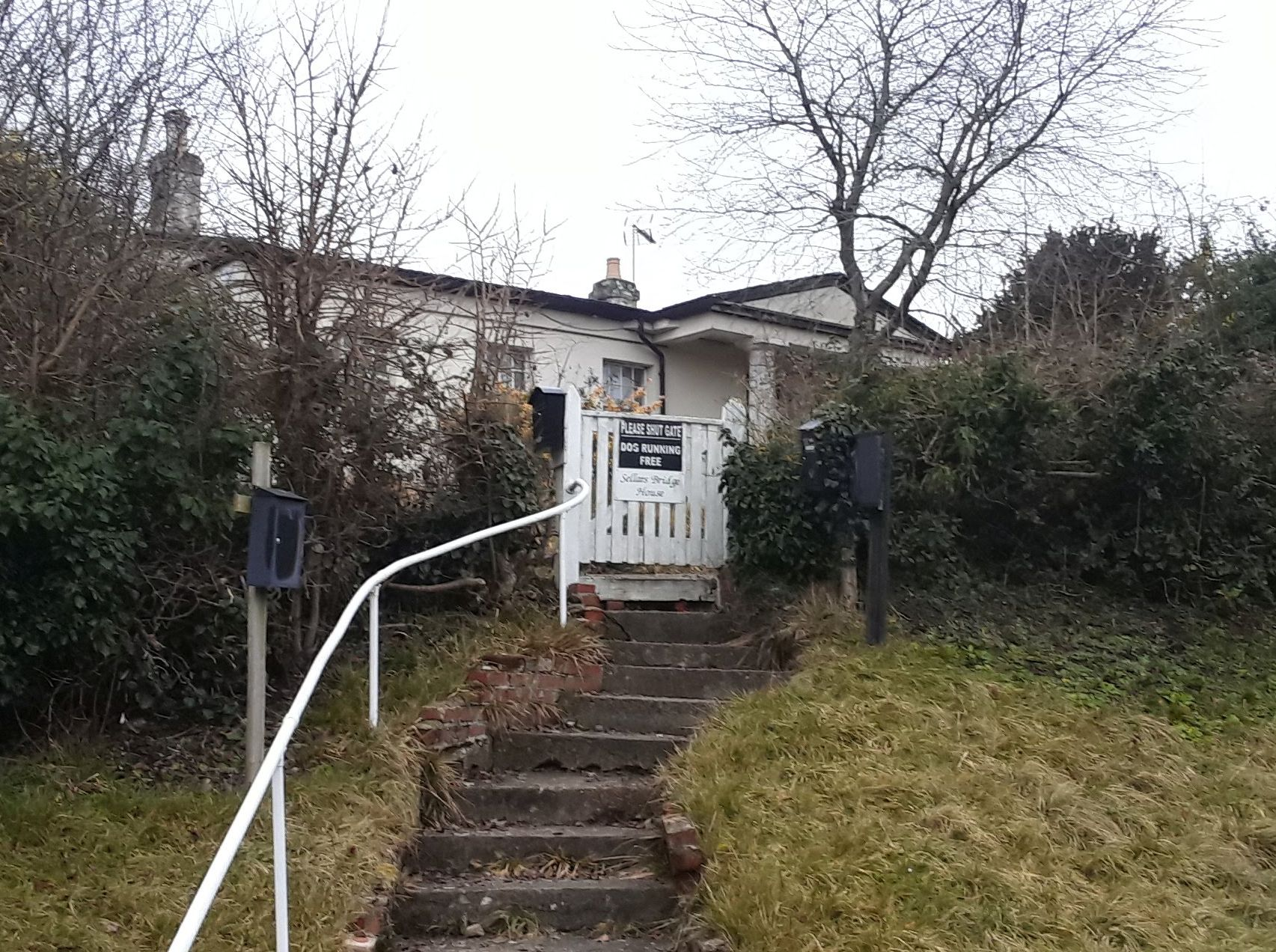
Sellars Bridge Bridge-house

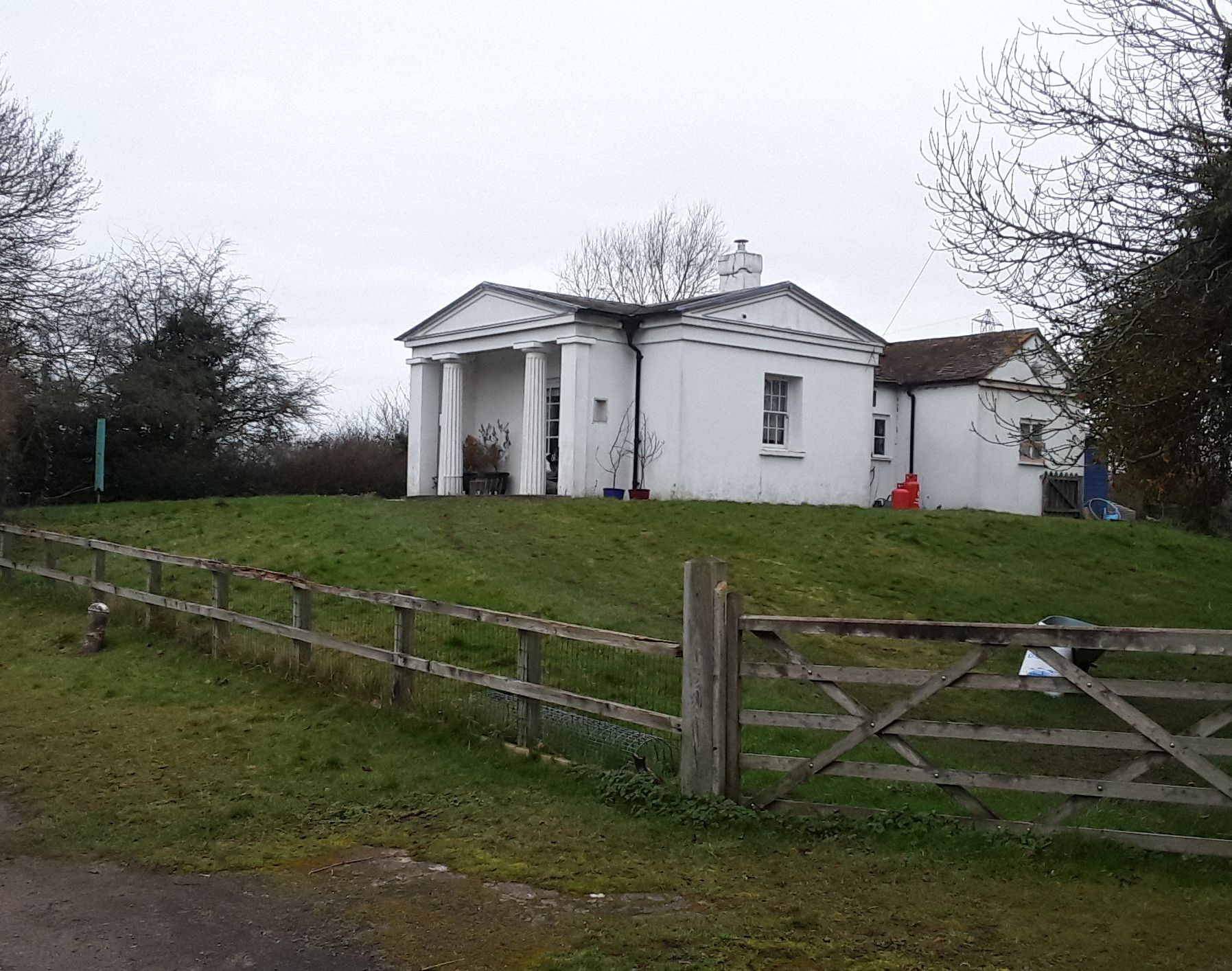
Hardwicke Bridge (now removed) Bridge-house

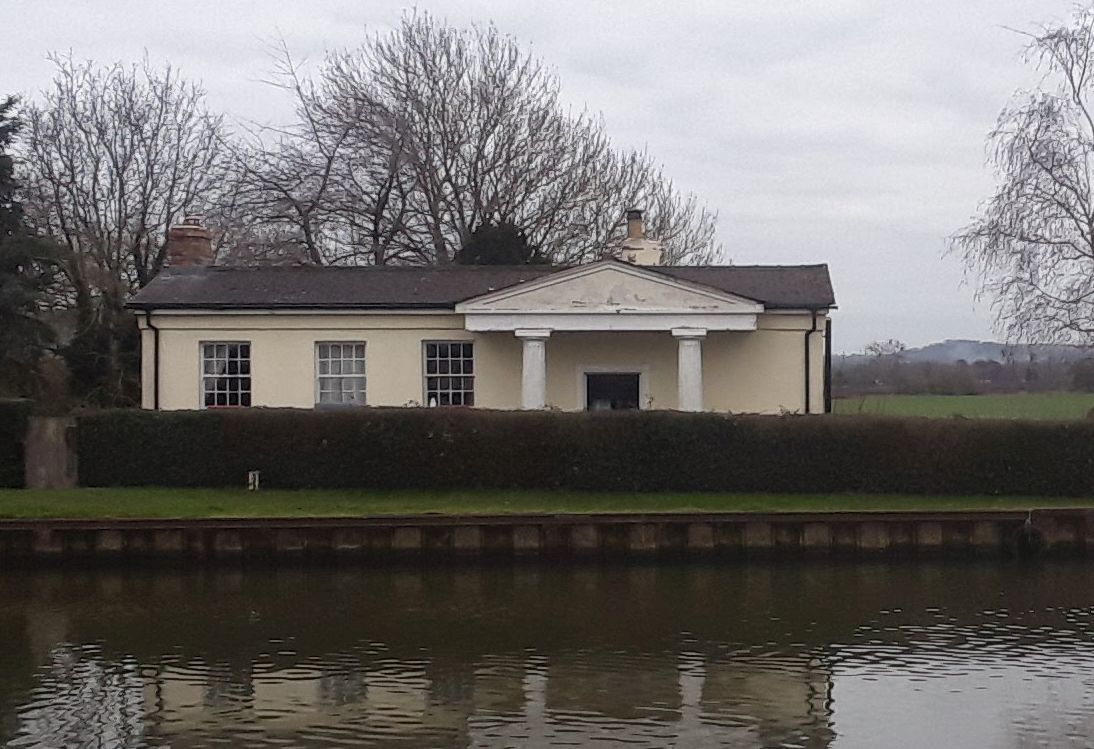
Parkend Bridge Bridge-house

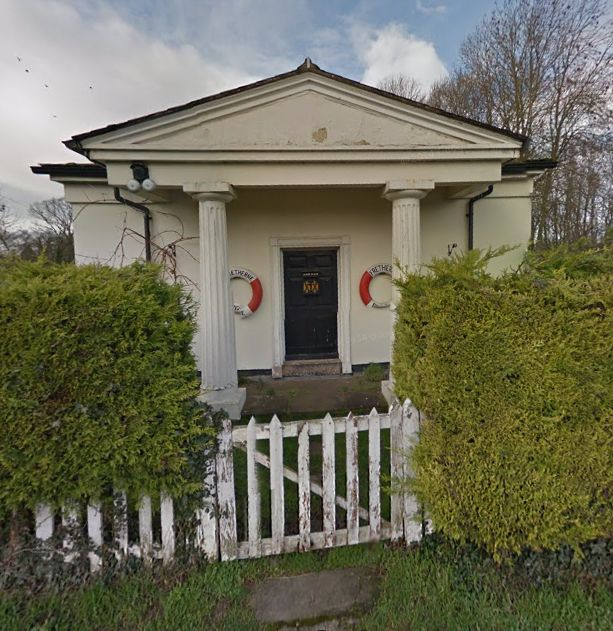
Fretherne Bridge Bridge-house

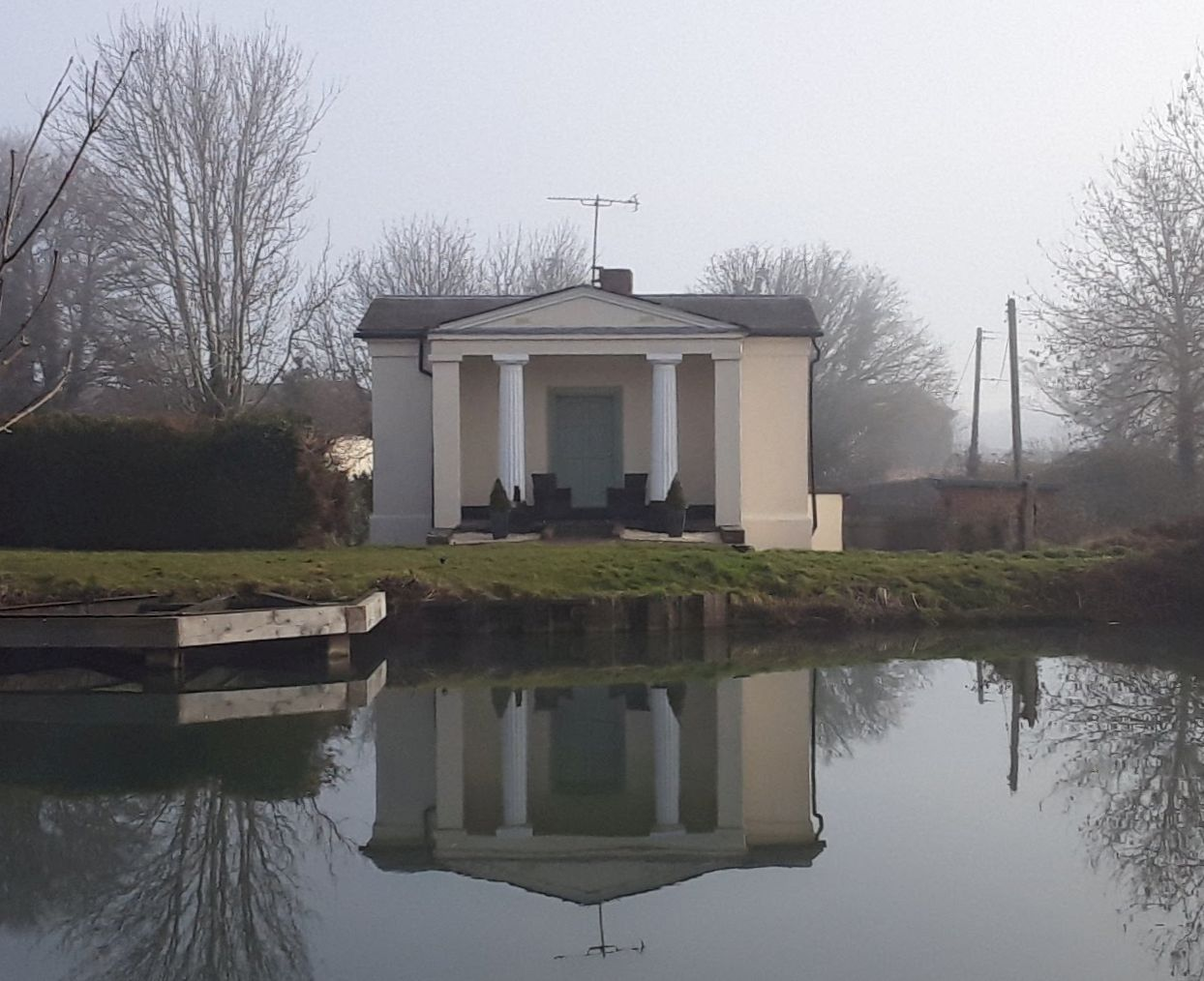
Splatt Bridge Bridge-house

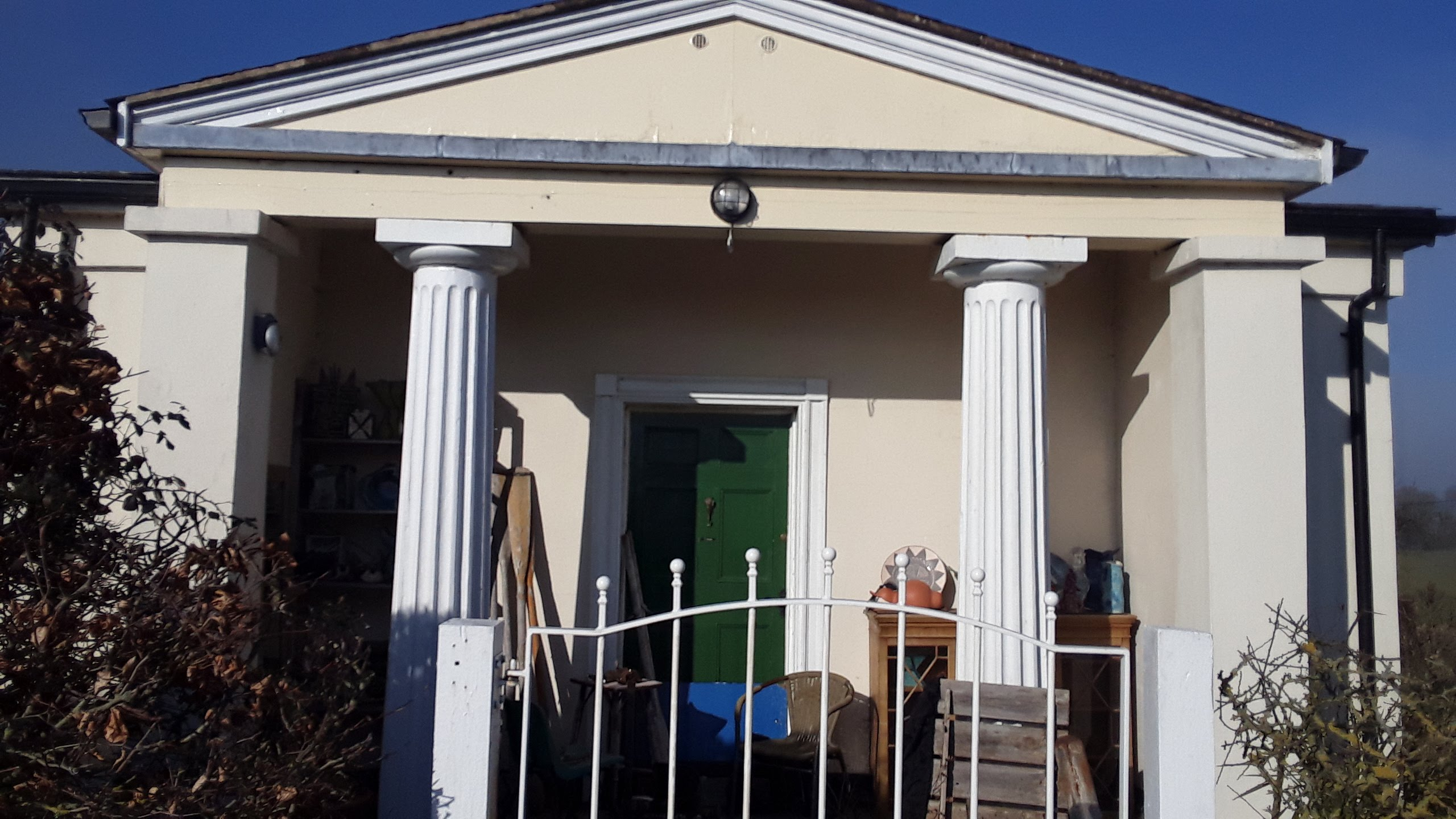
Cambridge Arms Bridge Bridge-house

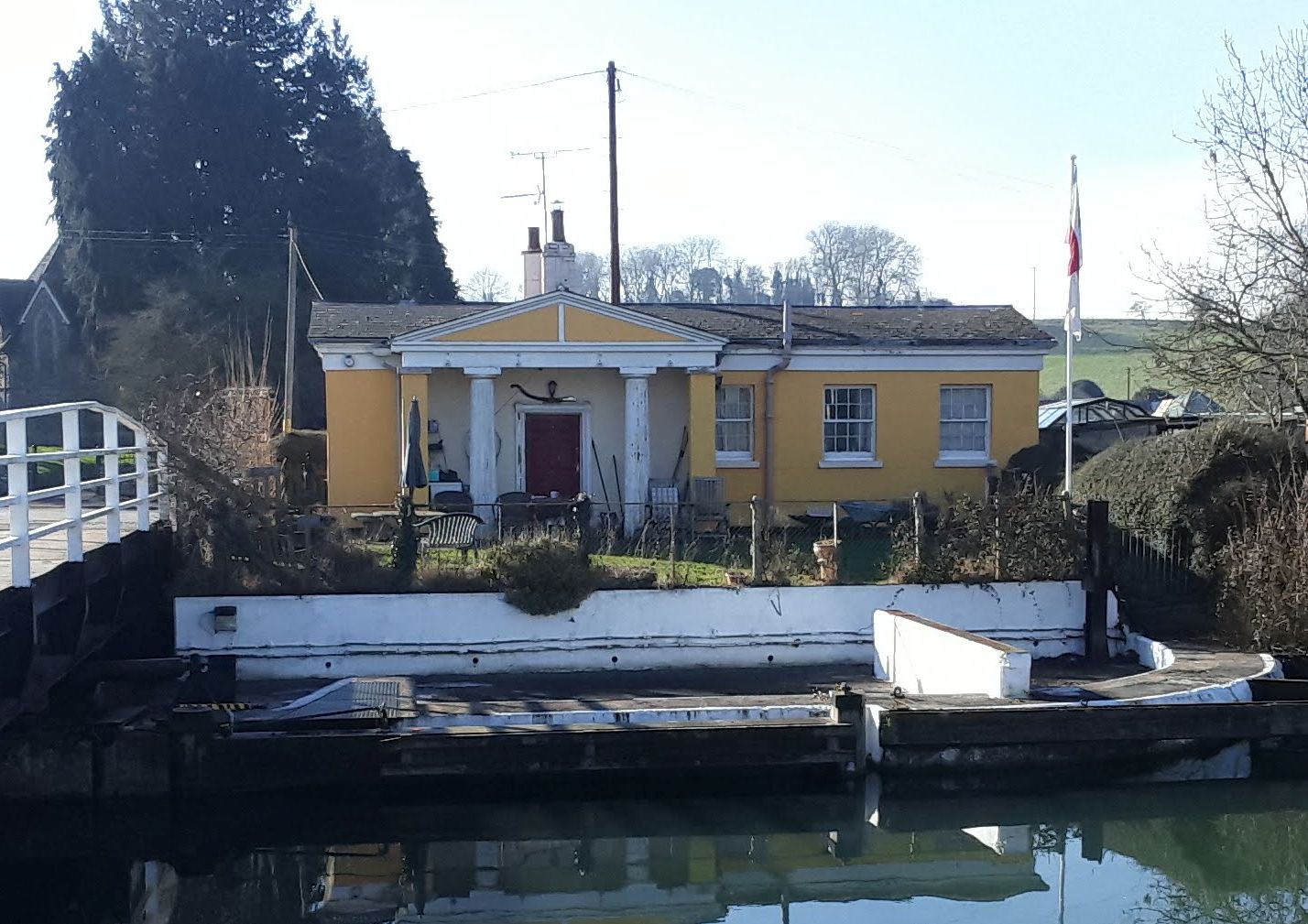
Purton Upper Bridge Bridge-house

== Modern times ==
In 1905 traffic exceeded one million tons for the first time. Oil was added to the list of cargoes carried by the canal, with bulk oil carriers taking fuel to storage tanks sited to the south of Gloucester. In 1937 the canal was navigated by the submarines HMS H33 and HMS H49. The canal was nationalized in 1948. At the same time the Sharpness Dock Police, which had policed the dock since 1874, were absorbed into the British Transport Police.

In 1955 the Board of Survey of Canals and Inland Waterways released a report that, among other things, described the Gloucester and Sharpness Canal as carrying substantial traffic and offering scope for commercial development.

The River Cam, which is subject to accretion due to industrial and agricultural runoff, is an important feeder for the Gloucester and Sharpness Canal. It was formerly navigable as the Cambridge Arm with one entrance lock leading to a basin and wharf at Cambridge, the limit of navigation due to mill weirs and low bridges on the Bristol to Gloucester road. The lock was missing and the basin abandoned by 1901. Most of the straightened channel has survived as flood defence measures and is potentially still navigable, but the entrance is now blocked by a low bridge at the site of the former lock.

By the mid-1980s commercial traffic had largely come to a halt, the canal being given over to pleasure cruisers with the exception of a few passages by grain barges. The oil trade ceased in 1985 with the closure of the petroleum depot at Quedgeley. To allow the A430 Gloucester southwestern bypass to be built, the canal had to be diverted. This new cut eliminated a major problem which had plagued commercial traffic since opening: the sharp double bend in the canal. The new section of channel was opened on 6 May 2006. In January 2009 a project began to replace the Patch Bridge swing bridge with a motor-powered design instead of the former hand-cranked system.

Today, the canal can be used by boats up to 64 m (210 ft) in length, 9.6 m (31 ft) in beam and 32 m (105 ft) in height. The maximum draft is 3.5 m (11 ft).

The canal links directly to the Stroudwater Navigation at Saul Junction, the only such flat crossing between two different canal companies anywhere in the world.

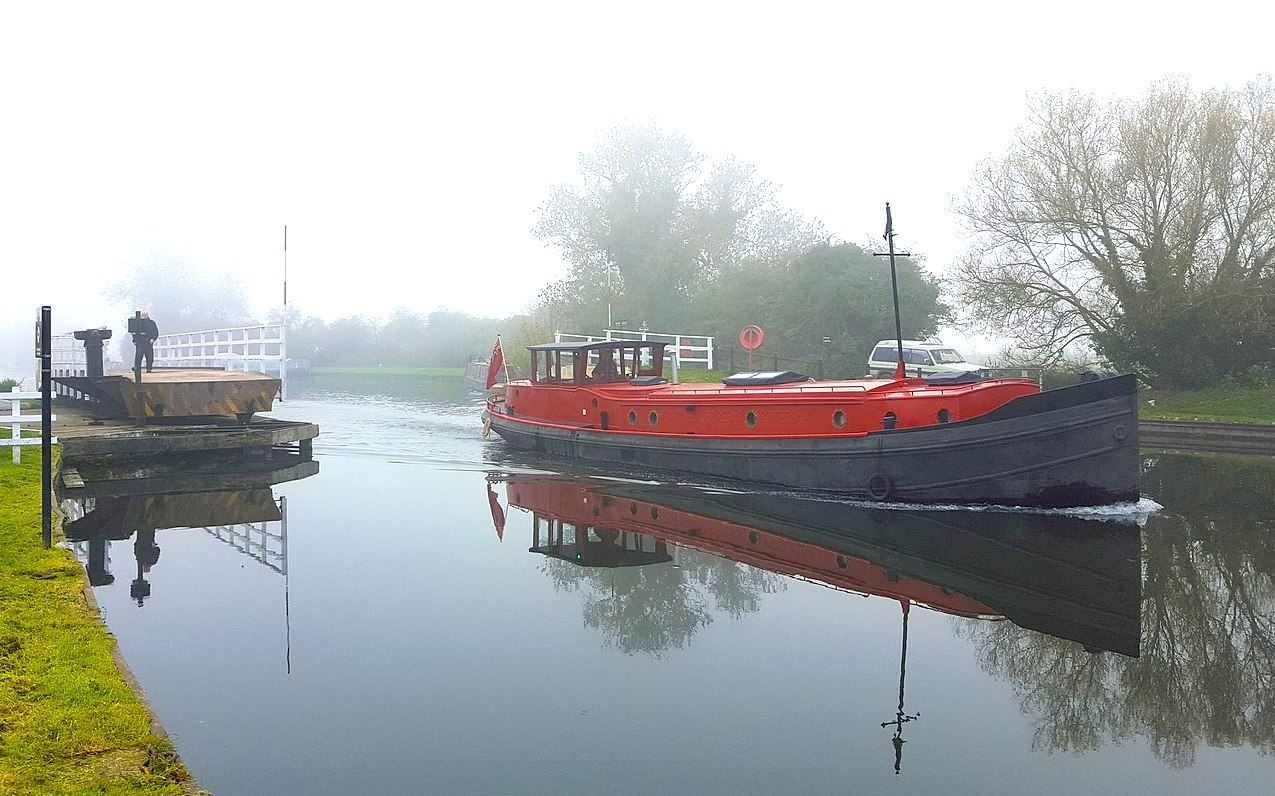
A motorised Dutch barge passing a swing bridge on the Gloucester & Sharpness Canal

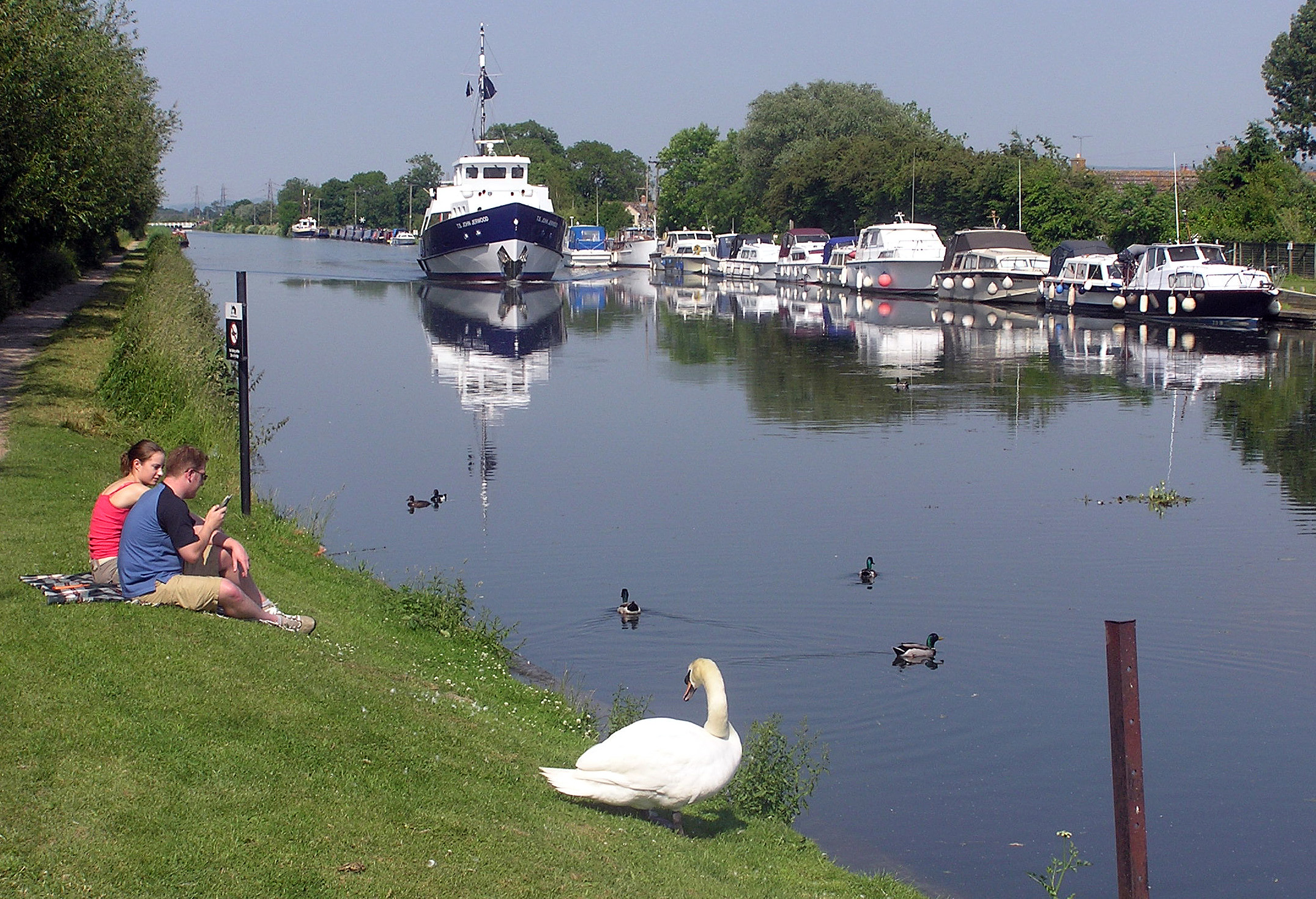
The canal at Patch Bridge, near the Wildfowl Reserve at Slimbridge

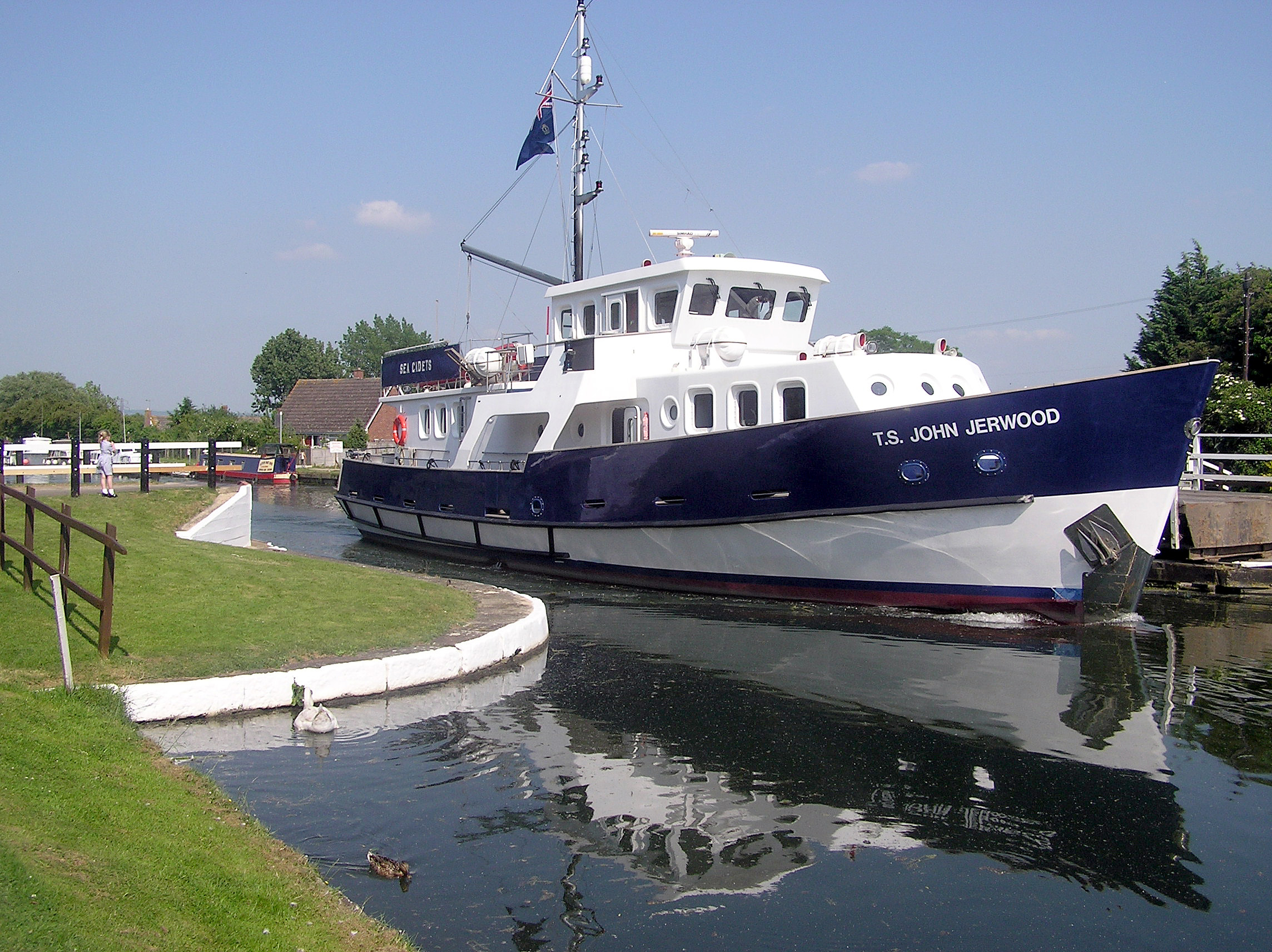
The Sea Cadet training ship TS John Jerwood passes through Patch Bridge, on its way to the River Severn

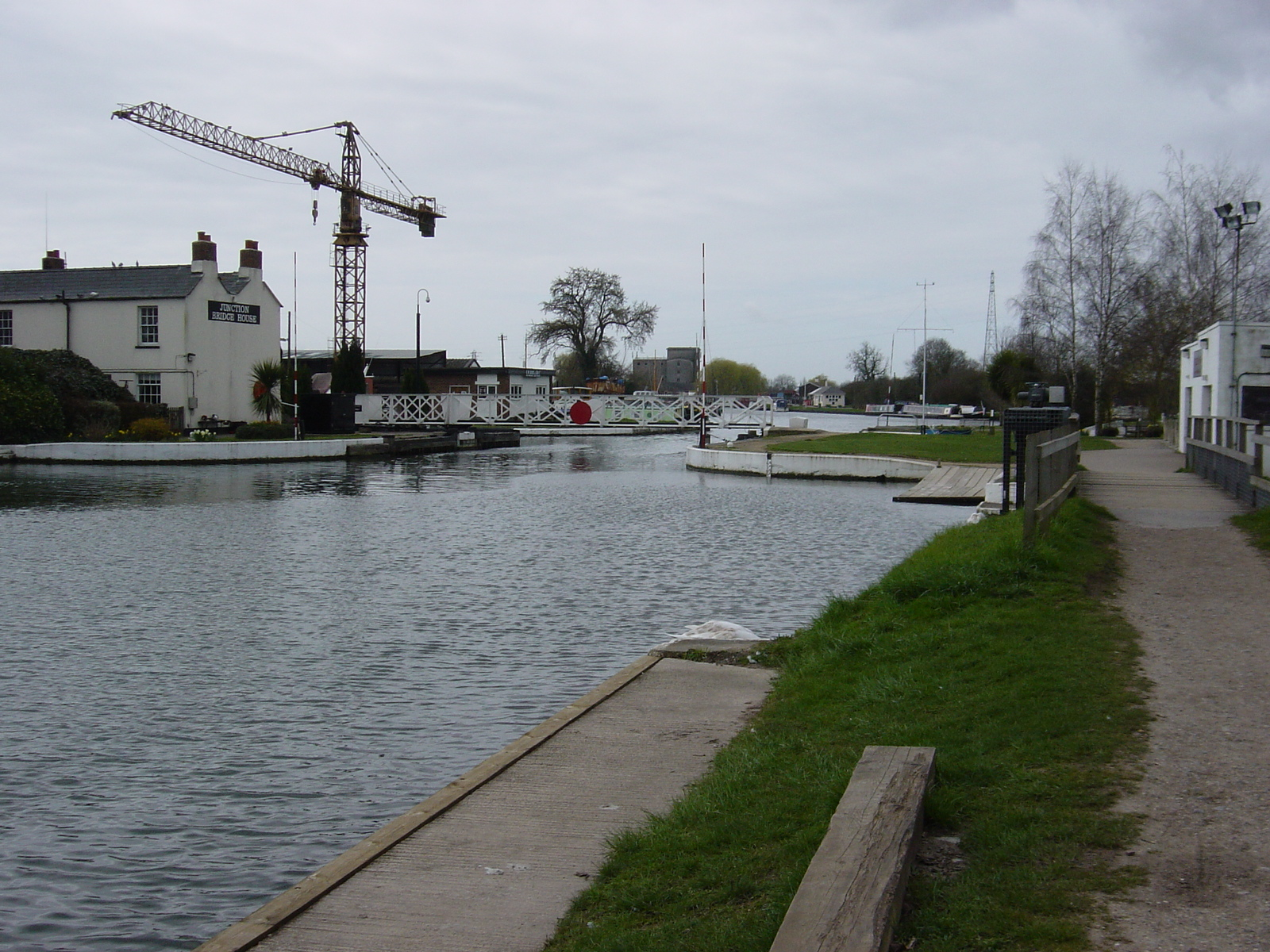
The canal at Saul Junction

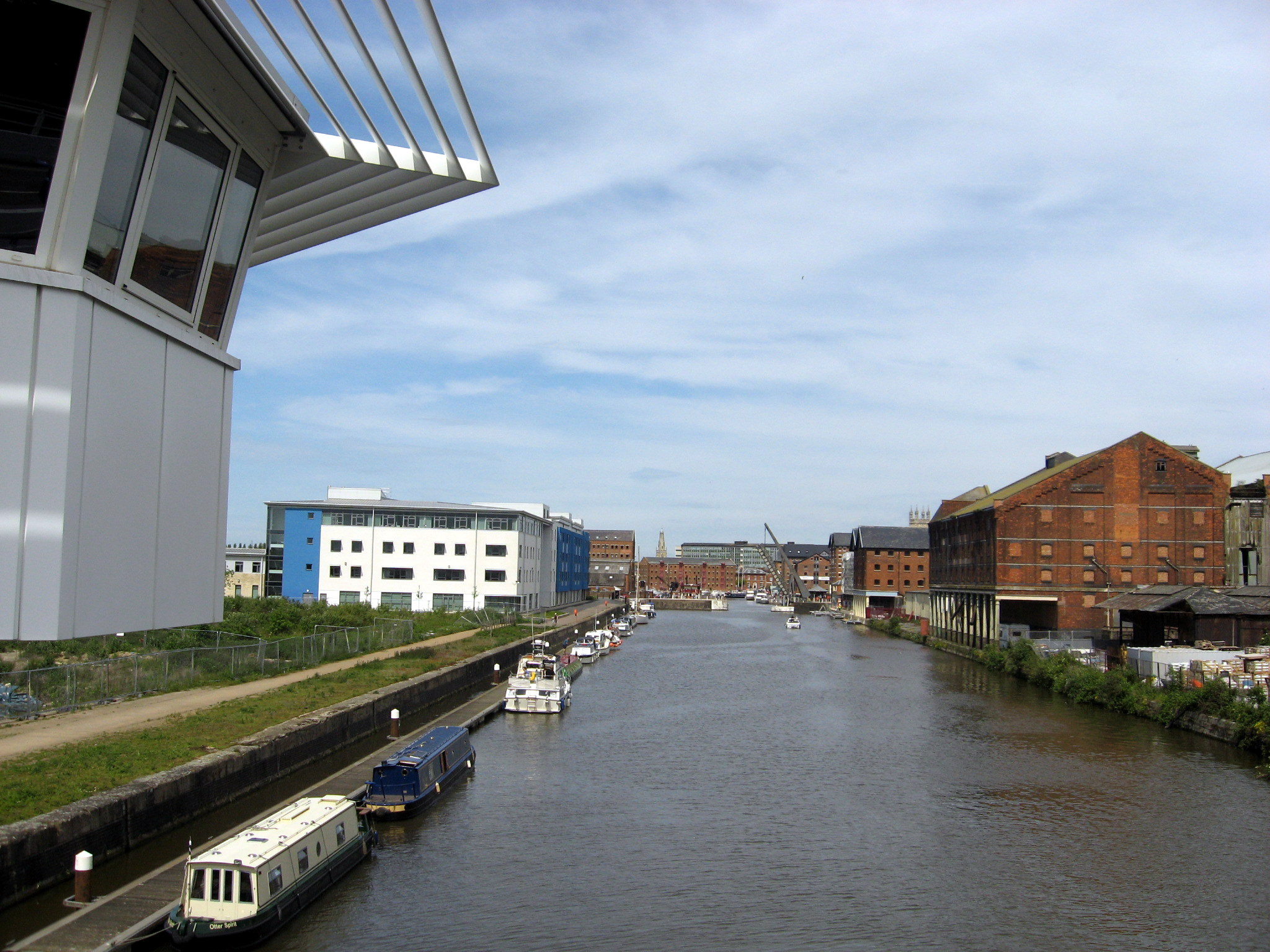
The canal at the entrance to Gloucester docks

== See also ==
- Canals of the United Kingdom
- History of the British canal system

== Bibliography ==
- Colin Green (1999). Severn Traders. Black Dwarf Publications. ISBN 0-9533028-2-2.
- Charles Hadfield (1969). The Canals of South and South East England. David and Charles. ISBN 0-7153-4693-8.
- Edward Paget-Tomlinson (2006). The Illustrated History of Canal & River Navigations (3rd ed.). Landmark Publishing Ltd. ISBN 1-84306-207-0.
- J.J. Tall; Paul Kemp (1996). HM Submarines in Camera An Illustrated History of British Submarines. Sutton Publishing. ISBN 0-7509-0875-0.
