= Purton, Lydney =

Village in Gloucestershire, England

Coordinates: 51.73913°N 2.47844°W

Purton
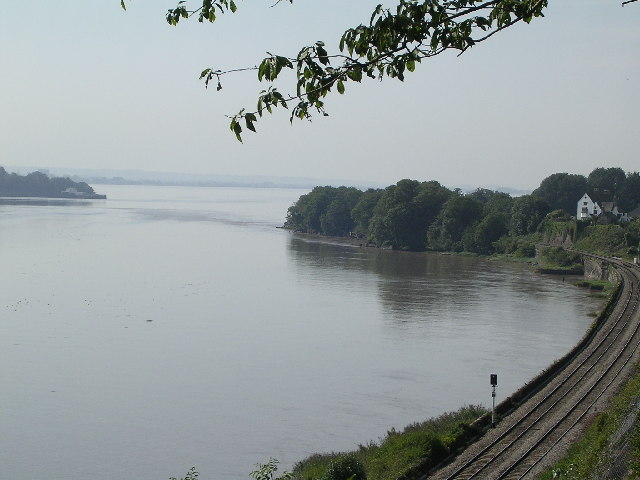
- View over the River Severn at Purton

- Location within Gloucestershire
- OS grid reference: SO670046
- District: Forest of Dean
- Shire county: Gloucestershire
- Region: South West
- Country: England
- Sovereign state: United Kingdom
- Police: Gloucestershire
- Fire: Gloucestershire
- Ambulance: South Western
- UK Parliament: Forest of Dean

Purton is a hamlet on the west bank of the River Severn, in the civil parish of Lydney in Gloucestershire, England. It lies opposite the village of Purton near Berkeley on the east bank of the river.

The name of the place derives from the Old English pirige tun, meaning "pear orchard". It was mentioned in the Domesday Book.

Purton was a small port, and there was a ferry across the river, Purton Passage, to the other Purton by 1282. In the late 18th and early 19th century, there was also a ford across the river here. In 1740, the removal of a large rock from the river bed on the Berkeley side caused the river to shift its channel. This meant only a single crossing a day was possible and led to a decline in the trade. The river had returned to its old channel ten years later, although it was altered by another shift in 1761. In the late 18th and early 19th century, the river was often forded at Purton, but some people, who misjudged the tide times, drowned. The ferry continued in use until 1879, when it was replaced by the Severn Railway Bridge. (Note: David Verey and Alan Brooks, in their 2002 revised edition, Gloucestershire 2: The Vale and The Forest of Dean, in the Pevsner Buildings of England series, describe the hamlet of Purton under the entry for Blakeney.)

The manor house is a Grade II* listed building. It dates from 1618 and lies immediately above the Chepstow/Gloucester railway line which passes in a deep cutting at that point. It has a principal block, of three storeys and three bays, parallel with the river and a wing which projects to the north-east, with a small extension added in the 19th century. Historic England, in its listing record, describes the manor house as "an important survival, somewhat modified over the centuries". A barn to the west of the manor house is listed at Grade II. Old Severn Bridge House, which Verey and Brooks note was formerly a hotel, is also Grade II listed.

To the north of the hamlet, the Purton Viaduct crosses the road from Etloe. Designed in 1830, and contemporary with the Stockton and Darlington Railway, it was planned as part of a crossing of the Severn, the Purton Steam Carriage Road which was never completed. (Note: Plans for the Purton Steam Carriage Road were strongly opposed by those whose commercial interests it threatened and the bill to permit construction was defeated in Parliament.) Historic England considers the viaduct of "considerable historical and industrial archaeological interest".

== Sources ==
- Baggs, A.P.; Jurica, A.R.J. (1996). "Lydney". In C.R.J. Currie; N.M. Herbert (eds.). A History of the County of Gloucestershire: Bledisloe Hundred, St Briavels Hundred, the Forest of Dean. Victoria County History. Vol. 5. Oxford: Oxford University Press. ISBN 978-0-197-22787-9.
- Mills, Anthony David (2003). A Dictionary of British Place Names. Oxford: Oxford University Press. ISBN 978-0-198-52758-9.
- Verey, David; Brooks, Alan (2002). Gloucestershire 2: The Vale and The Forest of Dean. Buildings of England. New Haven, US and London: Yale University Press. ISBN 978-0-300-09733-7.
