= Purton, Berkeley =

Village in Gloucestershire, England

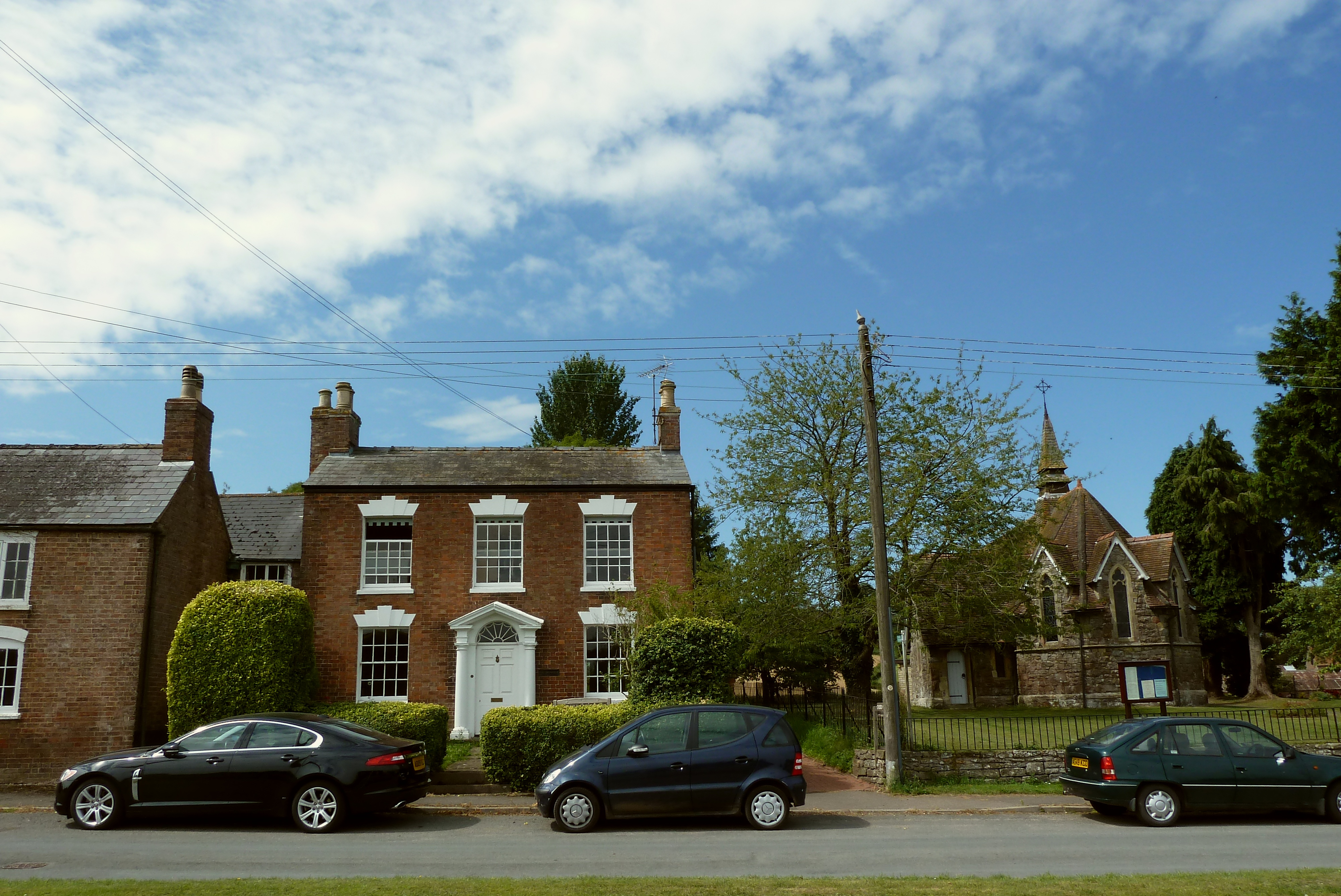
Georgian house, and the church of St John the Evangelist

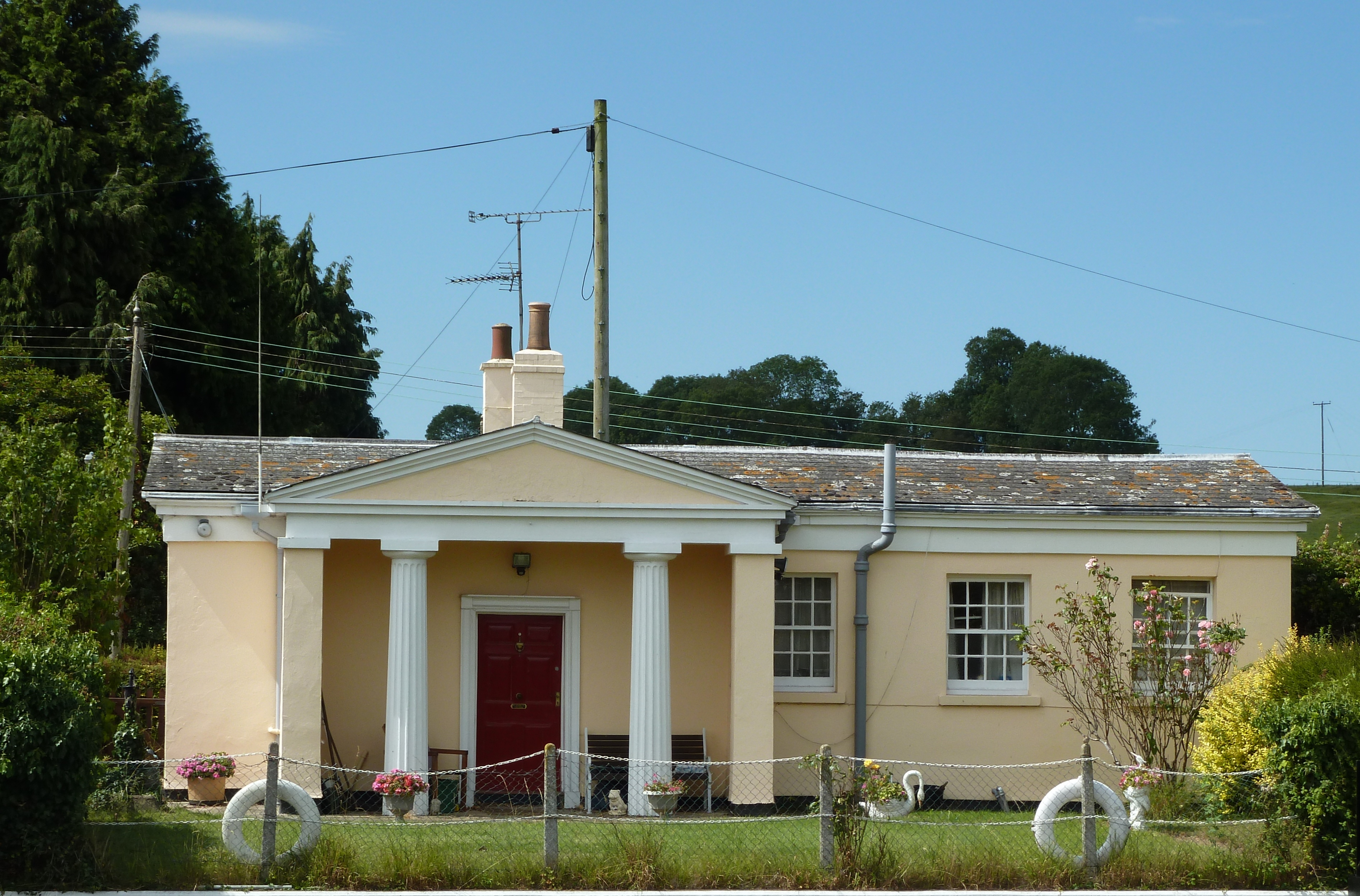
Canal bridgekeeper's house, designed by Robert Mylne

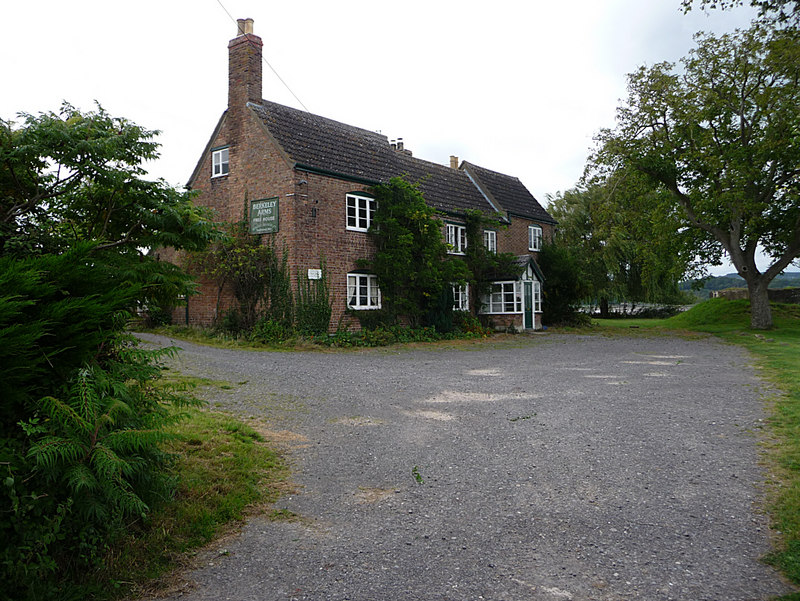
The Berkeley Arms

Purton is a village on the east bank of the River Severn, 3 miles north of Berkeley, in Gloucestershire, England. The village is in the civil parish of Hinton. It lies opposite the hamlet of Purton on the west bank of the river.

The Gloucester and Sharpness Canal passes through the village.

The name of the place derives from the Old English pirige tun, meaning "pear orchard".

== River crossing ==
By 1282, a ferry connected the two Purtons. In the late 18th and early 19th century, there was also a ford across the river here. The ferry, known as Purton Passage, continued in use until 1879, when it was replaced by the Severn Railway Bridge.

The Berkeley Arms public house is on the Campaign for Real Ale's National Inventory of Historic Pub Interiors.

== Tidal erosion barrier ==
In the early 20th century, a number of old vessels were run aground along the bank of the Severn, near Purton, to create a makeshift tidal erosion barrier to reinforce the narrow strip of land between the river and canal. Barges, trows and schooners were 'hulked' at high tide, and have since filled with silt. More boats have been added, including the schooner Katherine Ellen which was impounded in 1921 for running guns to the IRA, the Kennet Canal barge Harriett, and Ferrous Concrete Barges built in World War II.

== Purton Passage SSSI ==
Purton Passage
- Site of Special Scientific Interest
- Location within Gloucestershire
- Location of Purton Passage.
- Area of search: Gloucestershire
- Grid reference: SO687045
- Coordinates: 51.738778°N 2.453963°W
- Interest: Geological
- Area: 4.9 ha (12 acres)
- Notification date: 1966

Purton Passage (grid reference SO687045) is a 4.9-hectare (12-acre) geological Site of Special Scientific Interest near Purton notified in 1966. The site is listed in the ‘Stroud District’ Local Plan, adopted November 2005, Appendix 6 (online for download) as an SSSI and a Regionally Important Geological Site (RIGS).

It is adjacent to the Severn Estuary SSSI.

Rocks of the Upper Ludlow Silurian age are exposed on the foreshore at Tites Point. These include bone beds, and the area is a declared important educational resource for the study of vertebrate palaeontology. Most important are the plates of Cyathaspis banksi. The remains of primitive fish include thelodont denticles and acanthodian fragments.

Inspections by Natural England in 2009 report only acceptable change due to the natural processes of estuarine muds, and no establishment of vegetation; this is controlled due to the natural process of tidal scour.

== Purton Water Treatment Works ==
Built in the 1970s, the treatment works filters water from the Gloucester and Sharpness Canal and the River Frome and supplies around half of Bristol’s water supply.

== Site of Berkeley Castle's old duck decoy pond ==
This is the site of the old decoy pond; the new one is due north east at Slimbridge Wildfowl and Wetlands Centre, and is maintained in full working order.

Extract from The Book of Duck Decoys by Sir Ralph Payne Gallwey, 1886, ch7 p93

"...3 miles N. of the town of Berkeley, 12 miles SW. of Gloucester, and close to the south bank of the River Severn, within a mile E. of Purton. These are the only Decoys in the county. The pools, of which there are two within a mile of one another, are about an acre apiece in extent, and there are four pipes to each. The old pool is on the verge of the S. bank of the Berkeley and Gloucester Canal, which was formed so close to it that, fearing the Decoy would suffer therefrom, the new Decoy was constructed in 1840 between the canal and the Severn, on the New Grounds."

== SSSI Source ==
- Natural England SSSI information on the citation
- Natural England SSSI information on the Purton Passage unit
