= Berkeley Arms, Purton =

Pub in Purton, Gloucestershire, England

Coordinates: 51.737738°N 2.448421°W

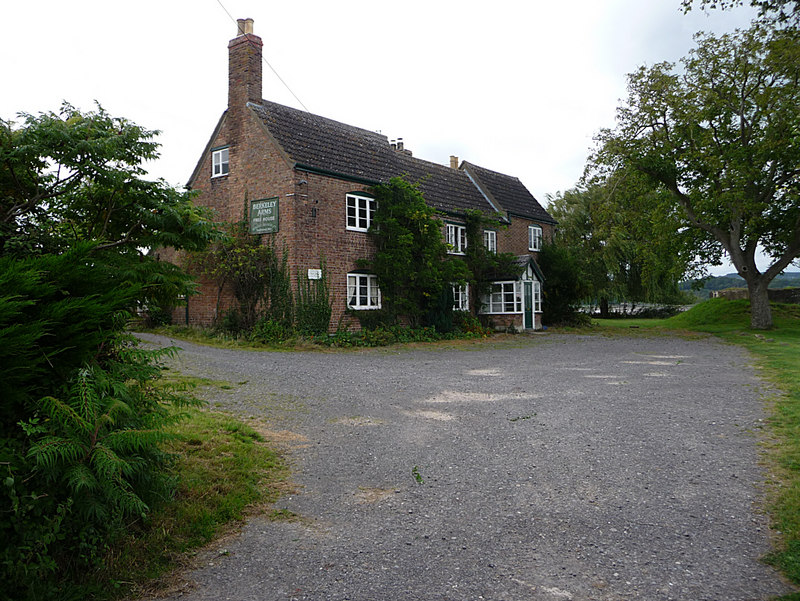
The Berkeley Arms

The Berkeley Arms is a public house at Purton, Gloucestershire GL13 9HU. The pub is owned by the Berkeley Castle Estate, under whose ownership it has been closed seeking a new tenant since August 2020. During the current vacancy, its historically significant interior was destroyed by renovation work.

It was previously on the Campaign for Real Ale's National Inventory of Historic Pub Interiors.
