= Charles Hill & Sons =

Former shipbuilding company in Bristol, England

Charles Hill & Sons was a major shipbuilder based in Bristol, England, during the 19th and 20th centuries.

== Background ==
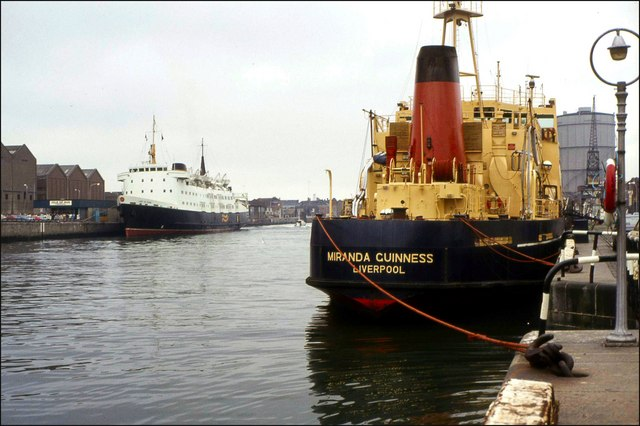
Miranda Guinness was the last ship built by Charles Hill & Son of Albion Yard, Bristol and also the world's first purpose built beer tanker. Launched on 9 July 1976.

Established in 1845 from the company Hilhouse, they specialised mainly in merchant and commercial ships, but also undertook the building of warships and governmental vessels especially during the First and Second World Wars.

The company became Charles Hill and Sons after shipwright Charles Hill, who joined the original shipbuilder in 1824, acquired and renamed the firm in 1845.

In 1879 they established Bristol City Line, a transatlantic service between Bristol and New York (BCL ceased operations after 1974). In 1881 the company built its first iron ship, and then moved into steel sailing vessels. In 1885 they built a trio of wood and iron composite-hulled lightvessels, one of which, the John Sebastian, is still in the harbour at Bathurst Basin.

A tugboat built by Charles Hill & Sons, MV Rozi, is now a tourist attraction - having been scuttled off the coast of Malta, it is now a sports scuba diving destination.

During World War 2, eight Flower-class corvettes and seven River-class frigates were built at the yard for the Royal Navy. These included HMS Mimosa (K11).

The company went out of business in 1977 and the dockyard was taken over by Abels Shipbuilders in 1980.

== Surviving Vessels ==
Surviving vessels built by the company include:

Year	Name	ON	IMO	Type	Reference
1855	John Sebastian			Light Vessel	
1931	Severn Progress	163832		Tug	
1934	Pyronaut	333833		Fire Float	
1934	Volunteer	163854		Tug	
1935	John King	163865		Tug	
1936	Endres Gane	163880		Fire Float	
1944	Sabrina 5	169378		Barge	
1944	Sabrina 6	169380		Barge	
1965	Bristol Giant		6510772	Pontoon Crane	
