= G.K. Stothert & Co =

Shipbuilding firm based in Bristol, UK

Coordinates: 51.44884°N 2.615590°W

G.K. Stothert & Co.
- Formerly: Henry Stothert & Co. (1837–1840); Stothert, Slaughter & Co. (1840–1854); Stothert & Fripp (1854-1856); Stothert, Dickinson and Co. (1856); Stothert & Co. (1856-1859); Stothert & Marten (1859-1863)
- Type: Private limited company (from 1909)
- Industry: Shipbuilding, marine engineering, ship repair
- Founded: 1852 (as separate shipyard at Hotwells); Origins from 1837 at St Philip's Marsh
- Founder: George Kelson Stothert
- Defunct: 1933
- Fate: Wound up; shipbuilding ceased 1904
- Headquarters: Clifton Marine Engineering and Iron Shipbuilding Works, Hotwells, Bristol, England
- Key people: George Kelson Stothert (sole proprietor, 1863–1899; d. 1908); Henry Stothert (original founder, 1837); Edward Slaughter (partner, 1840-1854); Ernest Theophilus Fripp (partner, 1854-1856); Frederick James Dickinson (partner, 1856); George Priestly Marten (partner, 1859-1863)
- Products: Iron ships, tugboats, barges, coasters, cargo vessels, passenger steamers, fire floats

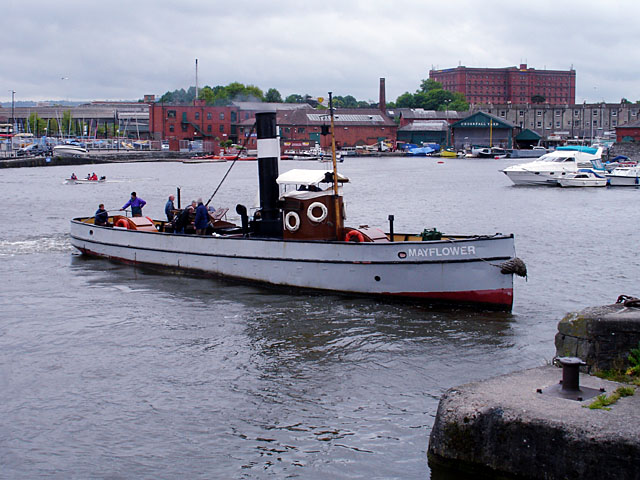
Mayflower was built by Stothert & Marten in 1861. She is the oldest Bristol-built ship afloat, and is believed to be the oldest surviving tug in the world.

G.K. Stothert & Co was a British engineering company primarily known for shipbuilding and repair founded in 1852 in Bristol, England.

== History ==
The Bristol offshoot of the Bath-based company which later became Stothert & Pitt had been set up in St Phillips in 1837 by Henry Stothert (as Henry Stothert & Co.) with the hope of gaining orders from the Great Western Railway. Edward Slaughter became a partner in 1840, resulting in the company being renamed Stothert, Slaughter & Co. By 1843 they had diversified into shipbuilding, producing two 105 ton iron screw steamers named Avon and Severn which were built for running between Newport and Bristol. The shipbuilding part of the company moved to Hotwells in January 1852, taking over the Hotwells shipyard that had previously been operated as George Lunell & Co. The yard already had some experience of building steam engines and iron hulled ships. Stothert, Slaughter & Co. launched their first ship from this site (the Juno) in May 1853. The shipyard was officially known as the Clifton Marine Engineering and Iron Shipbuilding Works. With Henry Stothert retiring and control passing to his nephew George Kelson Stothert (who had served an apprenticeship under Edward Slaughter) in 1854, it then separated from the parent company . Partnerships were formed with Ernest Theophilus Fripp (between 1854 and 1856), Frederick James Dickinson (briefly during 1856), and George Priestly Marten (1859–1863); after that, G. K. Stothert held sole control until 1899. When he died in 1908, the business was established as a limited company carrying his name. The business remained in operation under his name until 1933, although shipbuilding stopped in 1904. The railway works part of the company eventually became Avonside Engine Company.

A fire occurred at the yard in 1893; later correspondence states that this destroyed the company's records to that date.

After G. K. Stothert died, the obituary written by the Institute of Mechanical Engineers noted that he "...was one of the pioneers of iron shipbuilding in this country".

== Location ==
In 1852, the company started leasing an existing shipyard adjacent to the Cumberland Basin that was owned by the Society of Merchant Venturers. The premises had been used by George Lunnell between 1834 and 1851. The site consisted of slipways, Hotwells Dry Dock (now Pooles Wharf Marina) and Merchant's Dock (now filled in, although the old entrance is still visible).

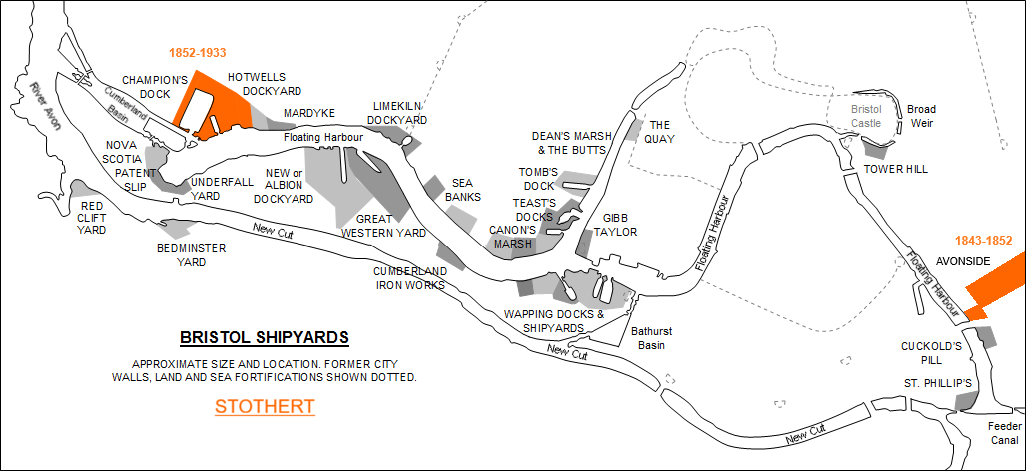
Bristol shipyards with the Stothert, Slaughter and Company owned Avonside works (mainly a locomotive and general engineering works but also used for shipbuilding from 1843-1852) and Hotwells shipyard highlighted.

In 1897, part of the site was sold by the Merchant Venturers (despite protests from G.K. Stothert) to the Great Western Railway to allow a line to be built to Canon's Marsh; these works restricted access to the shipyard from Hotwell Road and reduced the size of Merchant's Dock.

The company opened a branch at Sharpness during 1878, although this may have been quite short lived. The company opened an Avonmouth branch shortly after the completion of the Royal Edward Dock in 1909, which was in operation until at least 1920. This was housed in a building to the north of the Dry Dock.

== Vessels ==
Several large vessels were built within the first few years of operation, including the Scamander, Meander and Araxes, ranging between 780 and 1156 tons and being built in 1854 and 1855 for the Moss Line of Liverpool. Scamander and Meander were chartered by the French Government for service during the Crimean War, and G.K. Stothert also went to Crimea during 1855.

The company became known for producing river and canal tugs. They built thirteen used by or on behalf of the Gloucester and Sharpness Canal Company and it successors. This commenced with an initial order for three for their haulage contractor in 1860 (Moss Rose, 1860, Mayflower, 1861 and Violet, 1862) and ended with a final order for two for the Severn & Canal Carrying Company in 1904 (Active and Victor) which are believed to be the final vessels launched by G.K. Stothert. In addition to the thirteen, the Danks, Venn and Sanders tug Pioneer was used by its owners on the Canal from 1858 onwards and may have passed into the hands of the Canal Company at a later date.

The only timber vessel recorded as being launched by the company was the sailing ship Rebecca Mary, launched in 1876.

The yard numbers the company used seem to have covered all works undertaken, rather than just vessels; Mayflower's current boiler (dating from 1909) is yard No. 303.

Year	Name	Yard No.	ON	GRT	Type	Propulsion	Client
1843	AVON		3944	105	Passenger	Screw	Bristol New Steam Packet Company
1844	SEVERN		3947	104	Passenger	Screw	Bristol New Steam Packet Company
1844	MITAU			20	Tug	Paddle	Strows & Co.
1845	CRETE			134		Screw	Miles
1850	WAVE				Passenger	Screw	Stothert & Slaughter
1850	JENNY LIND				Passenger	Screw	
1851	JENNY JONES/BALMORAL		3953	166	Passenger / Cargo	Screw	Cardiff Steam Navigation Co
1852	QUEEN		3950	342	Passenger	Paddle	Hayle Brilliant Steam Navigation Company
Transfer to Hotwells shipyard
1853	JUNO/DAKOTAH		3818	298	Cargo	Steam	T. Fyson, Bristol
1854	SCAMANDER		25998		Cargo	Steam	William M. Moss & others, Liverpool
1854	MEANDER	8	3907	985	Cargo	Screw	Ross & Co., Liverpool
1855	ARAXES		10550	1156	Cargo	Screw	William M. Moss & others, Liverpool
1856	THOMAS POWELL		26800	401	Cargo	Screw	Thomas Powell & others, Newport
1856	TAFF		14351	148	Passenger	Paddle	Bristol General Steam Navigation Company
1856	PROSPERO		13331	308		Sail	C.T. Bowring & Co.
1857	ARTIZAN		20481	454	Cargo	Screw	G. K. Stothert, Bristol
1857	CLIFTON/CAMILLA		18580	446	Cargo	Screw	J. Edwards & Co.
1857	BEATRICE		16227	322	Cargo	Screw	Robinson
<1858	PIONEER				Tug	Screw	Danks, Venn and Sanders
1858	TRINCULO		21493	310		Sail	C.T. Bowring & Co.
1860	ENTERPRIZE		29213	97	Coaster	Screw	George Greenvell, Stephen Steeds, Thomas Pilditch, Alfred Palmer
1860	MOSS ROSE		N/A	33	Tug	Screw	T. Hadley, Purton
1860	EDMUND IRONSIDES		27876	94	Cargo	Screw	John Markham
1861	AJAX		29215	124	Cargo	Screw	Bristol General Steam Navigation Company
1861	DOLPHIN		44110	32	Tug	Screw	Bristol General Steam Navigation Company
1861	MAYFLOWER		105412	32	Tug	Screw	T. Hadley, Purton
1861	PIONEER				Tug	Screw	Weaver Navigation Trustees
1862	ALARM		44109	21	Tug	Screw	Bristol General Steam Navigation Company
1862	VIOLET		N/A		Tug	Screw	T. Hadley, Purton
1862	SEVERN		44257	98	Tug	Paddle	Bristol Channel Steam Towing Co., Cardiff (although launched for W.H. Martin & Co.)
1863	(SMALL YACHT FOR WEAVER NAVIGATION ENGINEER)				Yacht	Screw	Weaver Navigation Trustees
1864	RELIEF		50266	104	Tug	Paddle	The New Steam Tug Co. Ltd., Liverpool
<1865	EDWARD MORGAN						
<1865	RAINBOW						
<1865	FOUNTAIN						
<1865	FAIRY						
<1865	VOLUNTEER						Possibly Bristol Steam Towing Company
1865	RESOLUTE		51410	271	Tug	Paddle	New Steam Tug Company Ltd., Liverpool
1865	ORION		52779	777	Passenger / Cargo	Paddle	General Steam Navigation Co. Ltd., London
1865	MAHA LUKSHMI		29930	1141	Cargo	Sail	Rennie, Clowes and Co.
1866	NIGER		53182	128	Tug	Paddle	Anthony Hutton, Bristol
1867	MYRTLE		105414	32	Tug	Screw	T. Hadley, Purton
1868	PRINCESS OF WALES/ GIPSY KING	41	53195	104	Tug	Paddle	G. K. Stothert & Co.
1868	NEWPORT		53191	153	Cargo	Screw	John Stothert, Bristol
1869	STAR		63394	79	Tug	Paddle	Joseph Hazell & others, Cardiff
1869	ALERT		106257	31	Tug	Screw	C. J. King & Sons, Bristol
1871	IXIA	49	65302	227	Coaster	Screw	Turner, Edwards and Co., Bristol
1871	WELSH PRINCE	50	65304	154	Coaster	Screw	Richard Charles Ring, Bristol
1871	HAZEL		184871	32	Tug	Screw	T. Hadley, Purton
1875	VOLUNTEER		85820	24	Tug	Screw	C. J. King & Sons, Bristol
1875	SEA KING		91051	45	Tug	Screw	C. J. King & Sons, Bristol
1876	SPEEDWELL		105413	40	Tug	Screw	Sharpness New Docks and Gloucester & Birmingham Navigation Company
1876	REBECCA MARY		74861	96	Cargo	Sailing Vessel	George Farren, Caernarvon
1876	WORCESTER		n/a		Tug	Screw	Sharpness New Docks and Gloucester & Birmingham Navigation Company
1876	BIRMINGHAM		n/a		Tug	Screw	Sharpness New Docks and Gloucester & Birmingham Navigation Company
1877	GLOUCESTER		n/a		Tug	Screw	Sharpness New Docks and Gloucester & Birmingham Navigation Company
1878	NETHAM		78453	113	Coaster	Screw	Richard C. Ring, Bristol
1879	DOURO	51	78459	430	Cargo	Screw	G. K. Stothert & Co.
1880	SEA QUEEN		91052	53	Tug	Screw	C. J. King & Sons, Bristol
1881	LORD TREDEGAR/ WILLIAM PARFITT		106255	179	Dredger	Screw	Alexandra (Newport) Dock Company
1882	GALLOPER	84	86493	67	Tug	Screw	Young & Christie, Cardiff
1883	CLIFTON GROVE	89	85810	249	Coaster	Screw	William Butler & Co. Ltd., Bristol
1883	TEL-EL-KEBIR	90	89165	163	Coaster	Screw	L. J. Bowen, Cardiff
1884	ATALANTA	92	85813	143	Barge	Screw	Severn & Canal Carrying Co
1885	SEA PRINCE	114	91053	97	Tug	Screw	C. J. King & Sons, Bristol
1888	CONHAM		91069	77	Barge	Screw	Stone and Tinson
1889	PENMON		97222	97		Screw	William E. Davies, London
1890	FLAGSTAFF		97233	97	Coaster	Screw	William E. Davies, London
1892	TREDEGAR/STOKE LEIGH	167	98828	115	Coaster	Screw	William Galbraith, Bristol
1892	CARBON	170	98829	126	Barge	Screw	Alfred J. Smith Ltd., Bristol
1893	MERTHYR	184	102483	143	Coaster	Screw	William Galbraith, Bristol
1897	RESOLUTE		105415	62	Tug	Screw	Severn & Canal Carrying Co
1897	RELIANCE		117716	62	Tug	Screw	Severn & Canal Carrying Co
1901	RECRUIT		112850	59	Tug	Screw	William Cory and Son Ltd., London
1901	MAESTEG	243	111318	156	Barge	Screw	Bristol Lighterage Co. Ltd.
1901	GARTH	244	114861	156	Barge	Screw	Bristol Lighterage Co. Ltd.
1903	SALAMANDER		163867	47	Fire Float	Screw	Bristol Fire Brigade
1904	VICTOR/SEVERN VICTOR	278	147385	44	Tug	Screw	Severn & Canal Carrying Co
1904	ACTIVE/SEVERN ACTIVE	280	147381	53	Tug	Screw	Severn & Canal Carrying Co
