= Mayflower (tugboat) =

Steam tug (tugboat) built in Bristol in 1861

Coordinates: 51.44762°N 2.59835°W

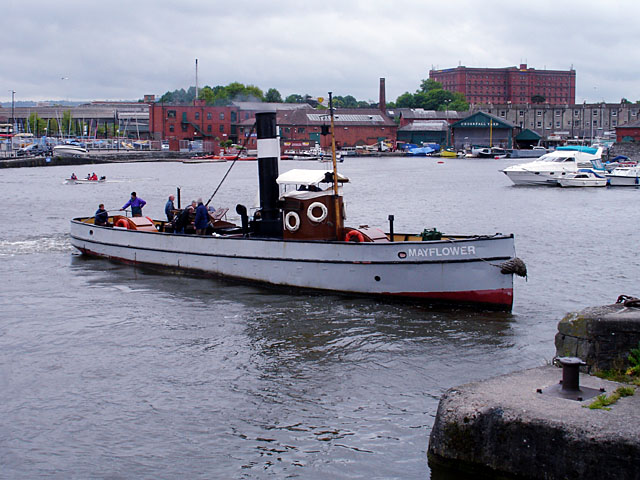

History

United Kingdom
- Name: Mayflower
- Port of registry: Gloucester
- Builder: Stothert & Marten
- Cost: £1,000
- Launched: 18 May 1861
- In service: 1861
- Out of service: 1964
- Refit: 1899, 1922
- Identification: UK official number 105412
- Status: Museum ship in Bristol Harbour

General characteristics
- Type: Steam tug
- Tonnage: 32 GRT
- Length: 63.3 ft (19.3 m)
- Beam: 12.0 ft (3.7 m)
- Depth: 7.2 ft (2.2 m)
- Installed power: 30 nhp, 150ihp
- Propulsion: Compound steam engine

Mayflower is a steam tug built in Bristol in 1861 and now preserved by Bristol Museums Galleries & Archives. She is based in Bristol Harbour at M Shed (formerly Bristol Industrial Museum). She is the oldest Bristol-built ship afloat, and is believed to be the oldest surviving tug in the world.

== Building ==
Mayflower was built by Stothert & Marten (later G.K. Stothert & Co), who were connected with the Bath-based engineering company best known as Stothert & Pitt. A branch of the Stothert family came to Bristol to start a company to build railway locomotives for the GWR during 1837 (this later became the Avonside Engine Company). This company started building ships in 1844, and by 1852 the shipbuilding part of the company became a separate entity based at Hotwells which survived in business until the 1930s.

Mayflower was built for the towage contractor Timothy Hadley to work on the Gloucester and Sharpness Canal and in the River Severn on behalf of the Canal Company. She was one of three tugs ordered shortly after trials by the Canal Company had shown they were much more efficient than horse-drawn boats. The other two tugs were Moss Rose (1860), which was very similar to Mayflower, and the smaller Violet (1862); together, they cost £3,000. All three were fitted with simple single cylinder vertical engines.

The tug has an iron hull. She is 63.3 ft (19.3 m) long, her beam is 12.0 ft (3.7 m), her depth is 7.2 ft (2.2 m) and her tonnage is 32 NRT. Her United Kingdom official number is 105412.

== Service ==
Mayflower started work between Sharpness and Gloucester Docks, towing trains of small sailing vessels such as trows and ketches, and, after the new docks at Sharpness were completed in 1874, larger steamers one at a time. During 1874, she was purchased (along with Hadley's four other tugs; the initial three had been joined by the Stothert built Myrtle and Hazel) by the Canal Company, which had by then renamed itself the Sharpness New Docks and Gloucester and Birmingham Navigation Company. She was fitted with a new boiler and a condenser (both provided by G. K. Stothert) in 1876, and converted into a tandem compound in 1888 by adding a new high pressure cylinder and piston above the existing one.

During 1895 the dock company had fitted the tug Speedwell with a more powerful inline compound engine to make her suitable for work in the Bristol Channel. This was deemed a success, and during late 1897 they decided to make similar modifications to Mayflower so that she could also undertake this work. Her original engine was replaced in 1899 with a vertical two-cylinder compound condensing engine supplied, along with a new boiler, funnel, propeller and shafting by W. Sisson & Co of Gloucester for £940 (Sisson had also provided the engine for Speedwell). Her original engine was transferred into Hazel. The steering position, which had previously been abaft the funnel, was moved forward, and a waist high iron steering shelter added to give the skipper some comfort. She went to work outside Sharpness, towing sailing vessels through the dangerous stretches of the Severn Estuary to the mouth of the river Wye and back again.

In early 1906, the dock company decided to compete with the Severn and Canal Carrying Company on the River Severn upstream of Gloucester to Worcester. Mayflower was again altered with the funnel being arranged to hinge down (counterbalanced with large weights which can still be seen) to enable her to pass under the fixed bridges on this stretch of water and set to work at the start of March 1906 alongside the similarly modified Myrtle. The S&CCC complained, but by early July they had given up towing and sold their tugs to the dock company.

During 1909 she was fitted with another new boiler, made by G.K. Stothert (No. 303) and costing £298; this boiler is still in the tug. She was now capable of working on every part of the navigation from Worcester to Chepstow, and because of this, became regarded as the training tug in the canal's fleet, which she continued to be until the end of her working life.

In 1922, she was again altered when the entire deck was raised by 12 inches (300 mm) which meant that the area beneath the deck at the stern could become another cabin albeit with very low headroom. At the same time the bulwarks were cut away down most of each side and replaced with stanchions and chains; this reflected the increased barge traffic on the canal, allowing the crew to step onto laden barges easily. In October 1938 a wooden wheelhouse replaced the steering shelter, and during the mid 1940s the bulwarks were replaced.

In 1948 the British Waterways Board took over the canal and made efforts to modernise the tug fleet. Between 1949 and 1958 all the former canal company steam tugs had diesel engines installed, except Mayflower and Speedwell which were the two oldest that remained by this point. Speedwell was scrapped in 1962, and Mayflower was given the job of 'mudding tug' – towing the mud hopper barges filled by the canal dredger to the discharge point. Sometimes she was needed to turn ships at Sharpness Docks and assist them in the entrance lock. In 1962–1963, when the winter was so cold that the canal froze and the diesel tugs had difficulty in working, Mayflower once again took on ship-towing work in the canal. Finally, British Waterways sold Mayflower to Mr H. E Morgan in 1967. Morgan was the managing director of Nordman Construction, who were demolishing the nearby Severn Railway Bridge at the time. After Nordman ran into financial difficulties demolishing the bridge, she was sold at auction on 21 May 1969 with Anthony Barrett, Kevin Donaghy and Leonard Sandford splitting ownership between them. After being sunk by vandals at her mooring in Victoria Basin around Easter 1977, she was to be auctioned on 9 July 1977, but the auction was called off due to negotiations with Bristol Museums. The negotiations failed as a price could not be agreed upon.

== Preservation ==
On 4 April 1981 she was auctioned, and purchased for £3600 by curator Paul Elkin of Bristol Museums & Art Gallery. She was then towed back to the city where she was built. Over the next six years Mayflower was restored to working order by a team of volunteers, and she steamed again in 1987. Early in 1988, she steamed back to Gloucester on a courtesy visit.

Mayflower regularly steams during the summer months carrying visitors on trips in Bristol Harbour. She marked her 150th anniversary in May 2011.

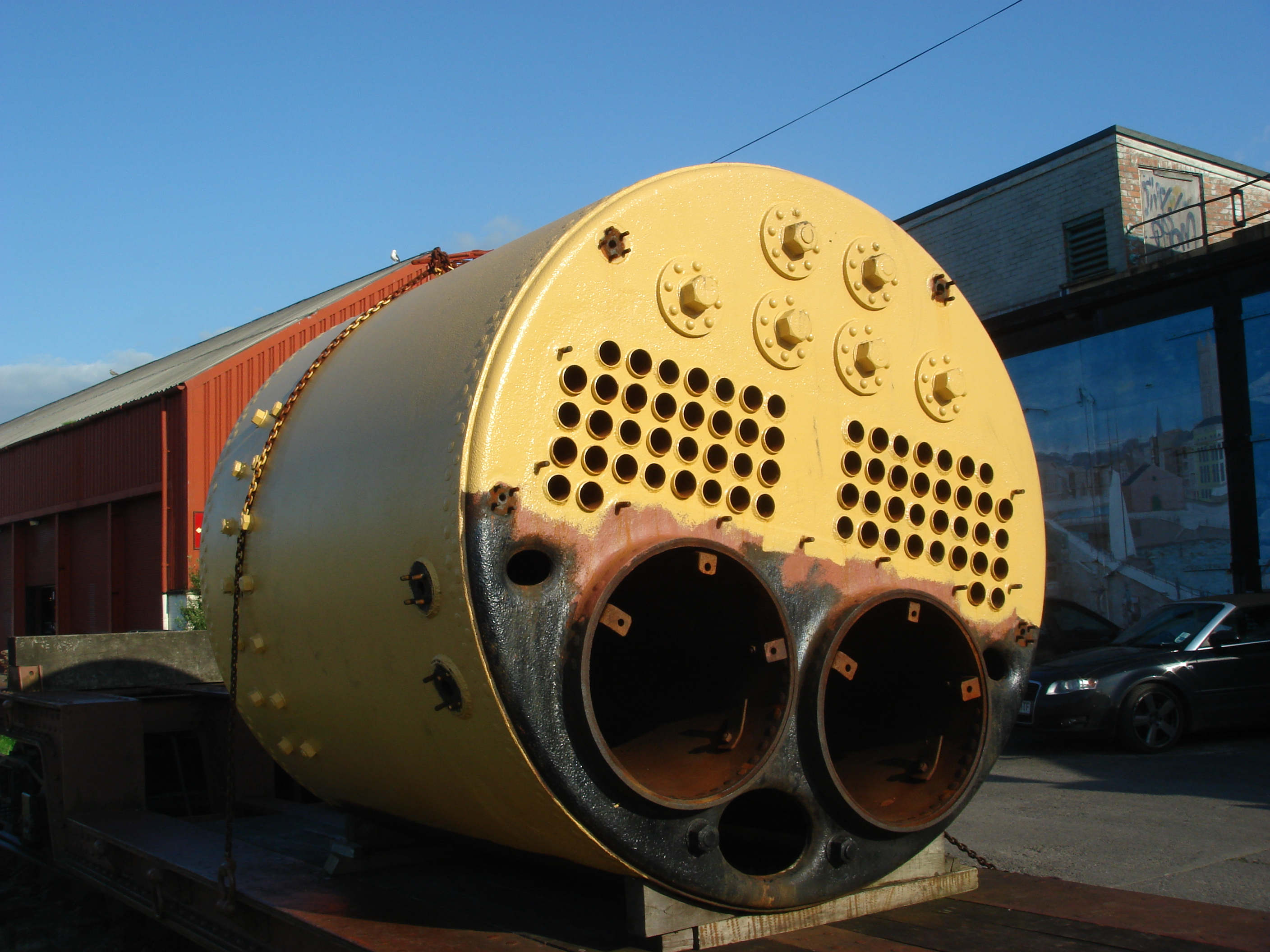
Mayflower's boiler in 2008

Mayflower had her boiler re-tubed in 2020 and returned to service in May 2021.
