= Block-setting crane =

Crane type for installing large stone blocks

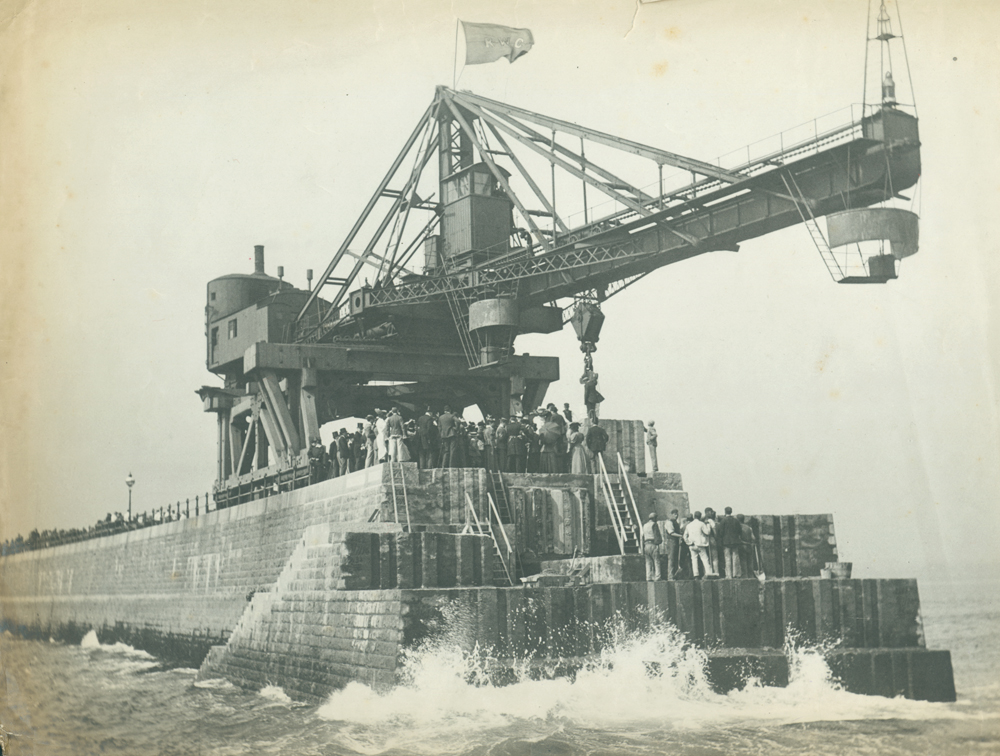
Building Roker Pier, Sunderland, 1895

A block-setting crane is a form of crane. They were used for installing the large stone blocks used to build breakwaters, moles and stone piers.

The mid-Victorian age was a time of great expansion in industry and shipping. Better protected harbours were needed, with man-made breakwaters extending beyond natural bays or coasts, in order to enclose safe harbours for the new generations of sailing ships and iron steamships being built. This time also coincided with the availability of large-scale ironworking with which to build cranes, and portable steam power with which to drive them. In contrast to the navvies who had built the earlier canals and the first railways mostly with human and animal muscle power, these new ports were built by powered engines as well.

== Development ==
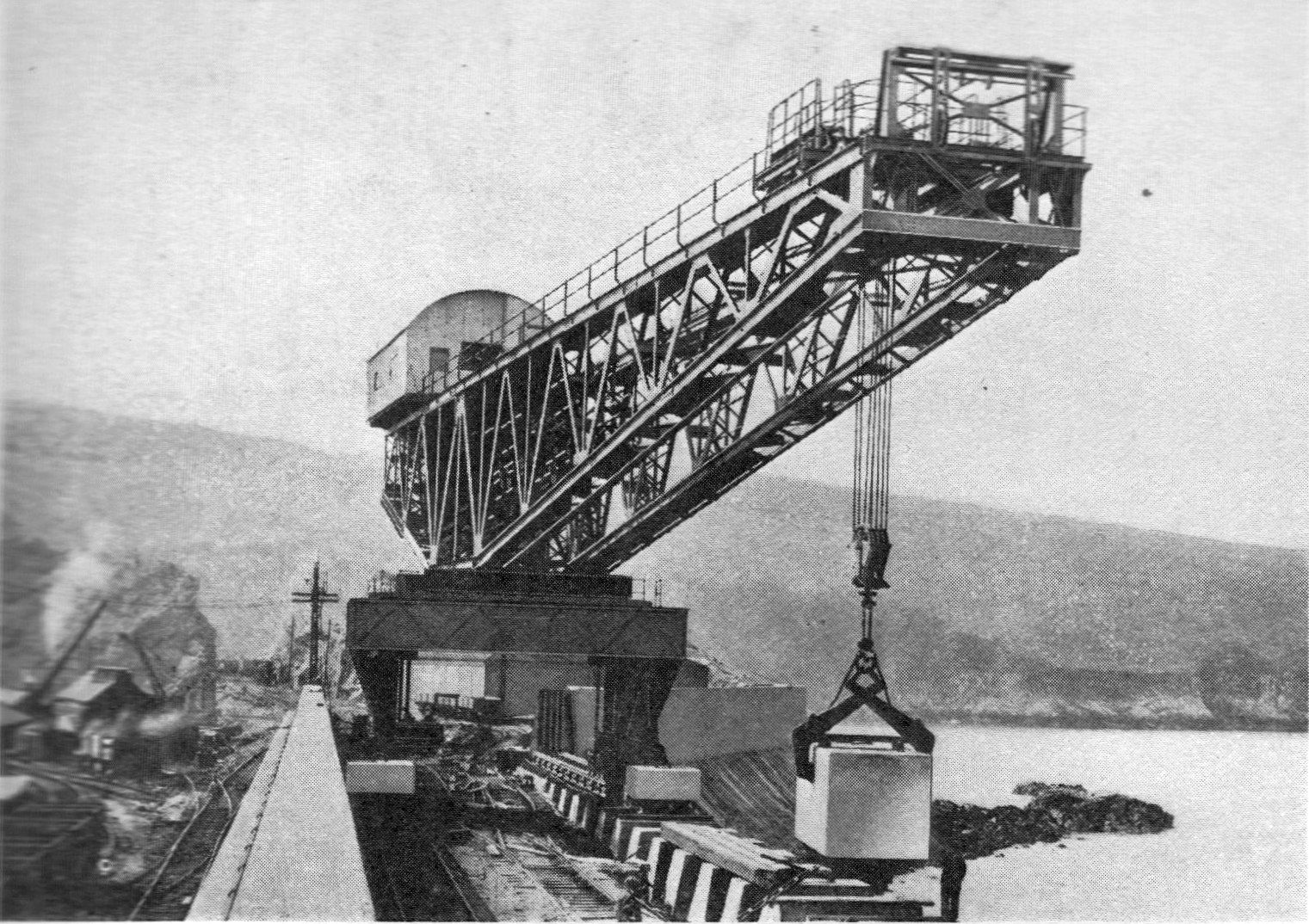
Stothert & Pitt Titan crane

Block-setting cranes were required to lift a single large block in one lift, and to position it accurately. They also needed to reach a distance horizontally, but not to lift their loads high. Their working area was along the length of the breakwater, which had not yet been constructed at the time that most of the heavy masonry was put into place.

Early breakwaters had been built from rubble or small boulders, dumped by hand from barges. Development in the mid-19th century of both powered lifting gear and Portland cement with which to cast large interlocking concrete blocks now involved the lifting of larger single blocks than could be moved by hand. A granite block weighs around 2 tons per cubic yard. Larger blocks were favoured as they required less masonry work to build with them and individual large blocks were more resistant to storm damage. Since the Eddystone Lighthouse of 1756, blocks had also been dovetailed together, to hold them more strongly and flexibly than with mortar. Assembling such blocks required a way of carefully positioning them, before sliding them downwards into place.

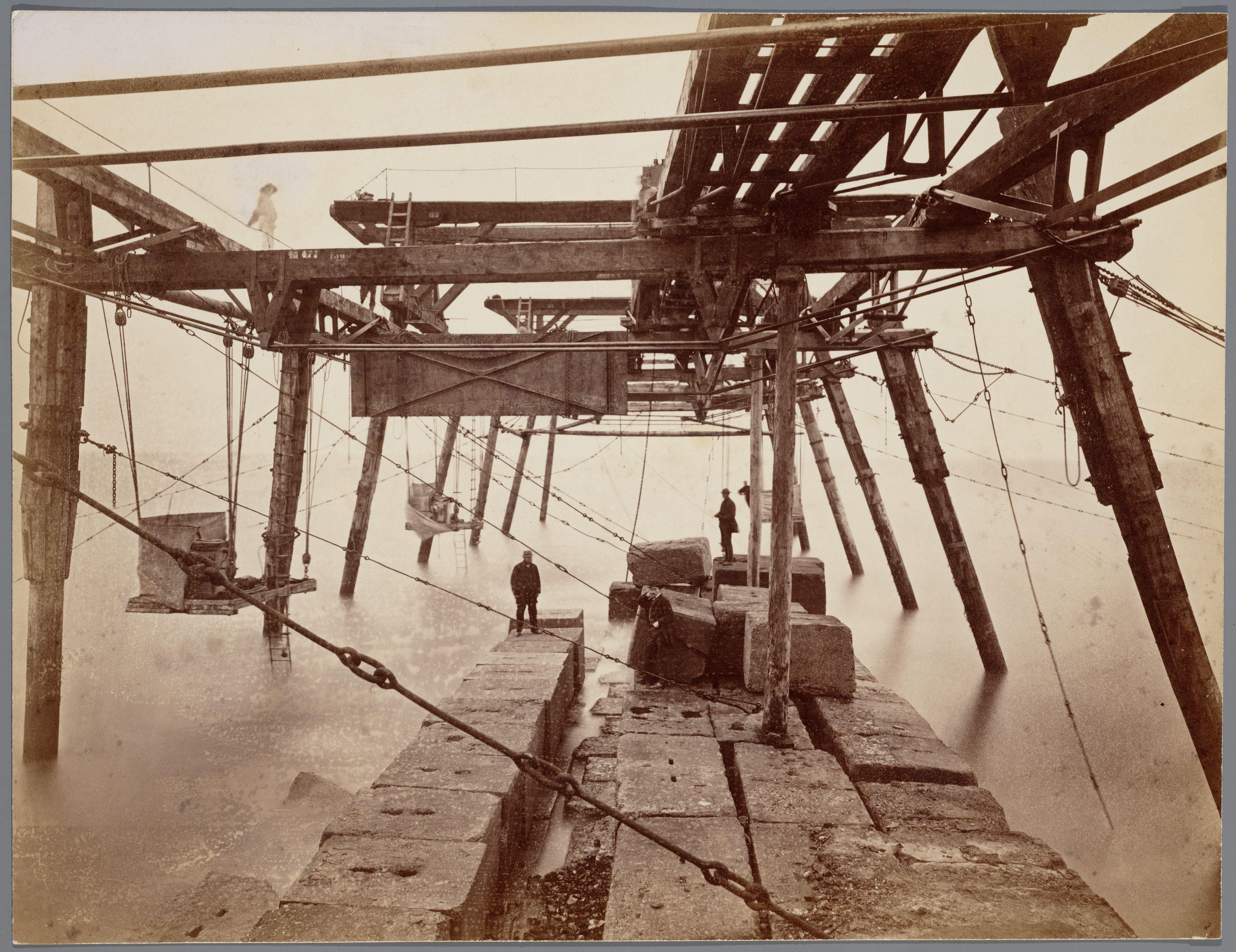
Construction of the first courses of the Noordzeekanaal, 1869, with a fixed gantry crane built as wooden pilings

The first cranes used for block-setting were floating cranes on barges. These could be moved around the job site easily and could carry powerful lifting gear. However they were unable to lift far from the gunwales of the vessel without risk of capsizing. To avoid this, they had to be anchored in position before each heavy lift, either by tying them down or by ballasting them to sit on the harbour bottom. This made their use very slow.

In shallow water, a Goliath crane could be used. This is a gantry crane with no jib. A trolley runs across this gantry and can move side to side across the line of the breakwater, whilst carrying a load. It ran on baulks of timber laid temporarily on either side of the construction. Such cranes could lift a load of 40 tons, large for the time, and could also move such a load sideways.

Railway-mounted cranes were already in use for railway construction and the recovery of railway accidents. However these were of limited capacity at this time: manually wound and with a capacity of only around 5 tons. They also required the lowering of screw jacks onto the rail heads before they could lift, which limited their ability to move a load. Most could not luff (Note: Moving the load radially in and out from the centre.) and when under load could only rotate at a fixed radius.

=== Parkes' Titan ===
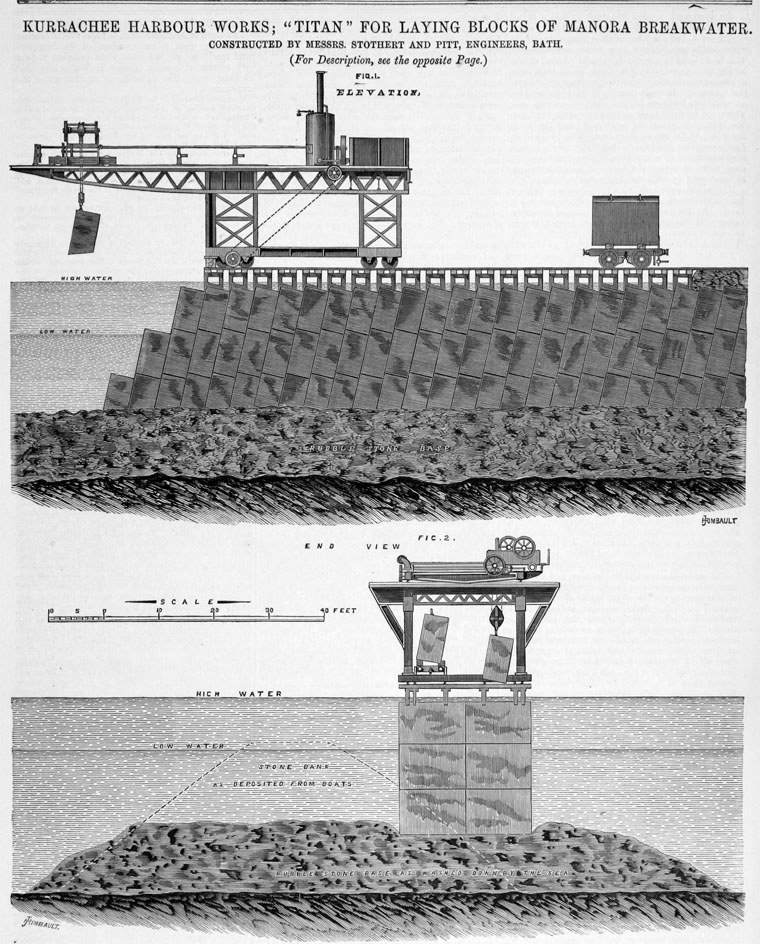
'Parkes' Titan' and the Manora breakwater, Karachi

In 1869, Stothert and Pitt constructed their first dedicated block-setting crane, 'Parkes' Titan' for the Manora breakwater, Kurrachee harbour, (Note: Kurrachee is now known as Karachi) This was to the design of William Parkes (1822-1889). The blocks to be set were cast of concrete, laid at angles against each other, and weighing around 27 tons each. The completed breakwater was to be 24 feet square in section, comprising three courses of blocks, laid on 9000 tons of rubble, dumped as a foundation. As was typical, this rubble foundation was left to settle over a winter's storms before block-laying commenced. The gantry of the crane spanned the width of the breakwater and the two railway lines upon it, with a projection over the end of the newly constructed breakwater. A horizontal gantry, crosswise to the breakwater could run up and down this, and a traveller upon that gantry could move from side to side. The projecting gantry of 23 feet allowed two courses of blocks to be laid before the whole crane had to be moved forwards. It was powered by an 8 hp steam engine, on top of the gantry which, together with its water tank, acted as a counterweight.

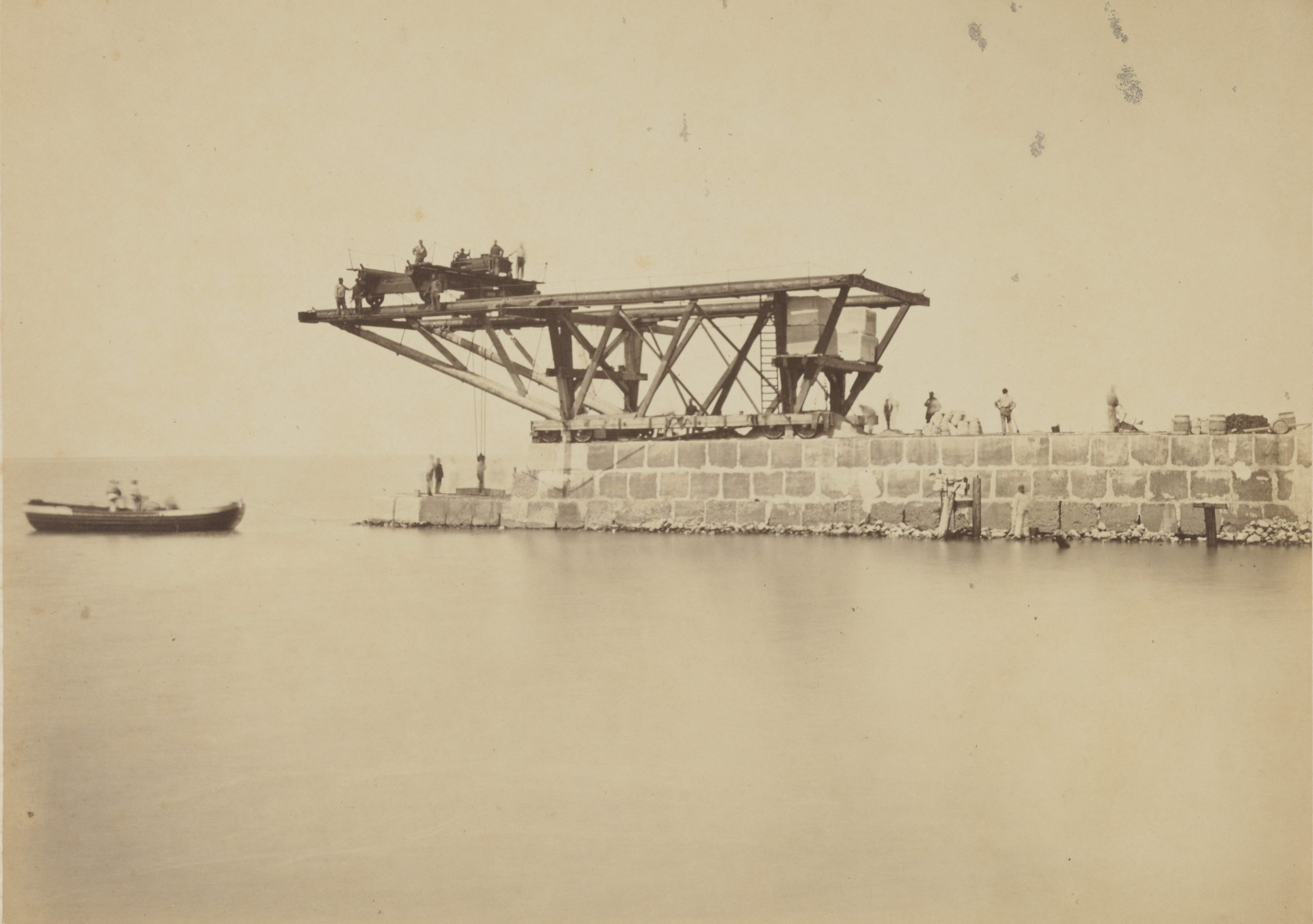
Construction of the Noordzeekanaal with an early Parkes' type crane, c. 1871

In 1872 it was moved to Madras

Although, like many Victorian cranes, named allegorically as a 'Titan', the design had more in common with the 'Hercules' design than the later hammerhead 'Titan'. This may have been the first crane to be so named.

=== Moa ===
Jib cranes were rarely used for block setting as they had insufficient lifting capacity. One of the first to do so was Moa, used for construction of a breakwater at the new port of Oamaru, New Zealand in 1872. Weather conditions here in the Pacific Ocean meant that there was no calm summer season for building and so a crane was needed which could lift 40 tons, was rail-mounted to allow easy movement, and could also make heavy lifts whilst still 'F.O.R.' (free on rails), rather than more slowly having to be wheeled into place, then raised on rigid blocks before lifting. Although railway steam cranes were becoming common at this time, they had lifting capacities only half this and needed to be blocked up first. Owing to a lack of local stone, the breakwater was built from concrete blocks, cast on site, using cement brought from England. This breakwater work may also have been the site of the world's first concrete mixer.

=== Coode's crane for Port Alfred ===
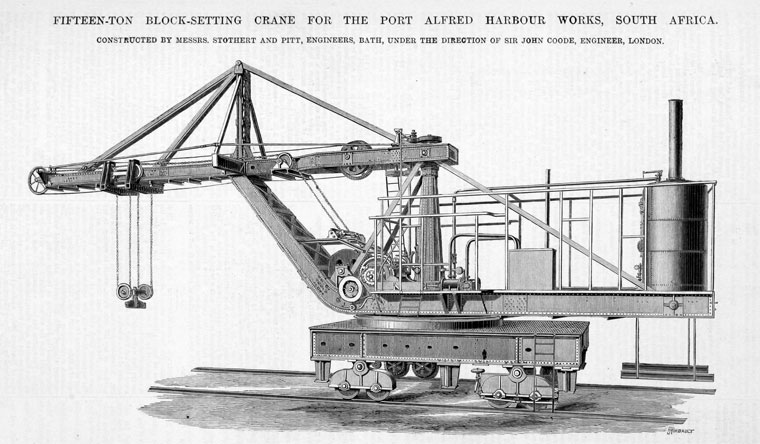
Stothert & Pitt's 15 ton crane for the Port Alfred harbour works

In 1881, Stothert and Pitt constructed a horizontal jib crane for Sir John Coode's harbour building work on the Kowie River at Port Alfred in South Africa.

This was a rail-mounted steam crane, with a fixed horizontal jib carrying a movable trolley or 'crab'. The crane, including the steam plant, could slew on a central king post bearing. This represented all the main features of the fully developed block-setting crane, although at a small scale as yet. The fixed horizontal jib extended far enough to place the hook 45 feet from the king post, and the trolley could move 20 feet in from that position. This level carriage was copied from cranes already in use in foundries. Compared to a jib crane, (Note: See level-luffing crane for a form of jib crane developed later to avoid this limitation.) this allowed blocks to be moved sideways precisely, without them also being moved up and down. The crane ran on a railway carriage of 15 feet gauge and could be powered by the crane's engine. When lifting, the rail carriage was wedged underneath to take the load. Slewing was possible all around the crane, which allowed a block to be picked up from a wagon behind the crane and moved to the front of the breakwater. The lift capacity was 15 tons, and there was enough wire rope to allow the hook to descend 26 feet below rail level.

The crane was highly successful in use. The ability to move blocks rapidly from the wagons bringing them, and to put them in place accurately, was better than any other crane types yet used for this work.

=== Hercules ===
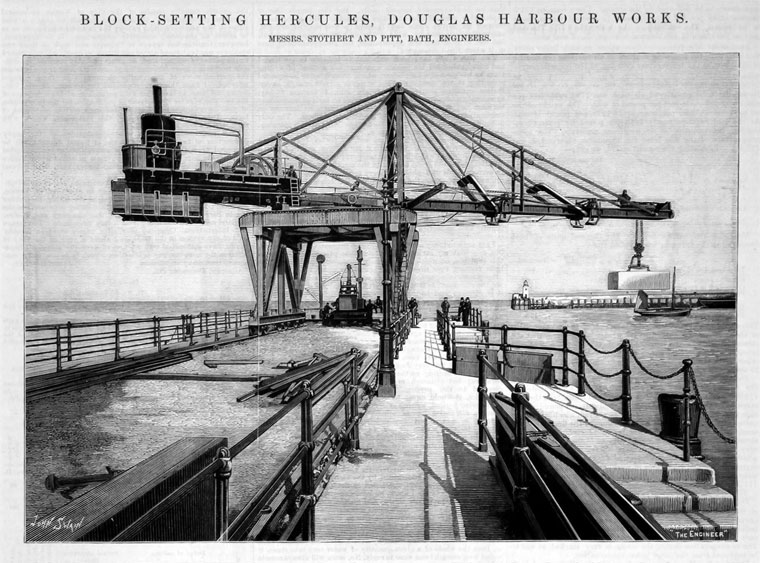
Douglas Harbour Breakwater

In the mid-1880s, a further development of the crane design took place, the Hercules crane. A crane was needed which could set larger and heavier blocks, up to 30 tons.

The Hercules design combined aspects of the Manora and the Port Alfred cranes. A horizontal jib was used, with the ability to slew sideways. As it was not possible to adapt the kingpost bearing and full-circle slewing of the Port Alfred crane to this new load, the design reverted to the Manora type where the lower frame of the crane allowed blocks to pass beneath it on wagons. The jib was now separate from the lower frame though, supported on two carriages which could move sideways, thus allowing the jib to slew over a small angle. For building linear breakwaters, this small slew angle was enough. Although the mechanical design of the jib was as a kingpost truss, this kingpost was now part of the jib and rotated with it, rather than fixed to the frame beneath it. The kingpost was also placed further outboard, at the edge of the large ring bearing, making the most of the truss' span for increasing the reach of the jib.

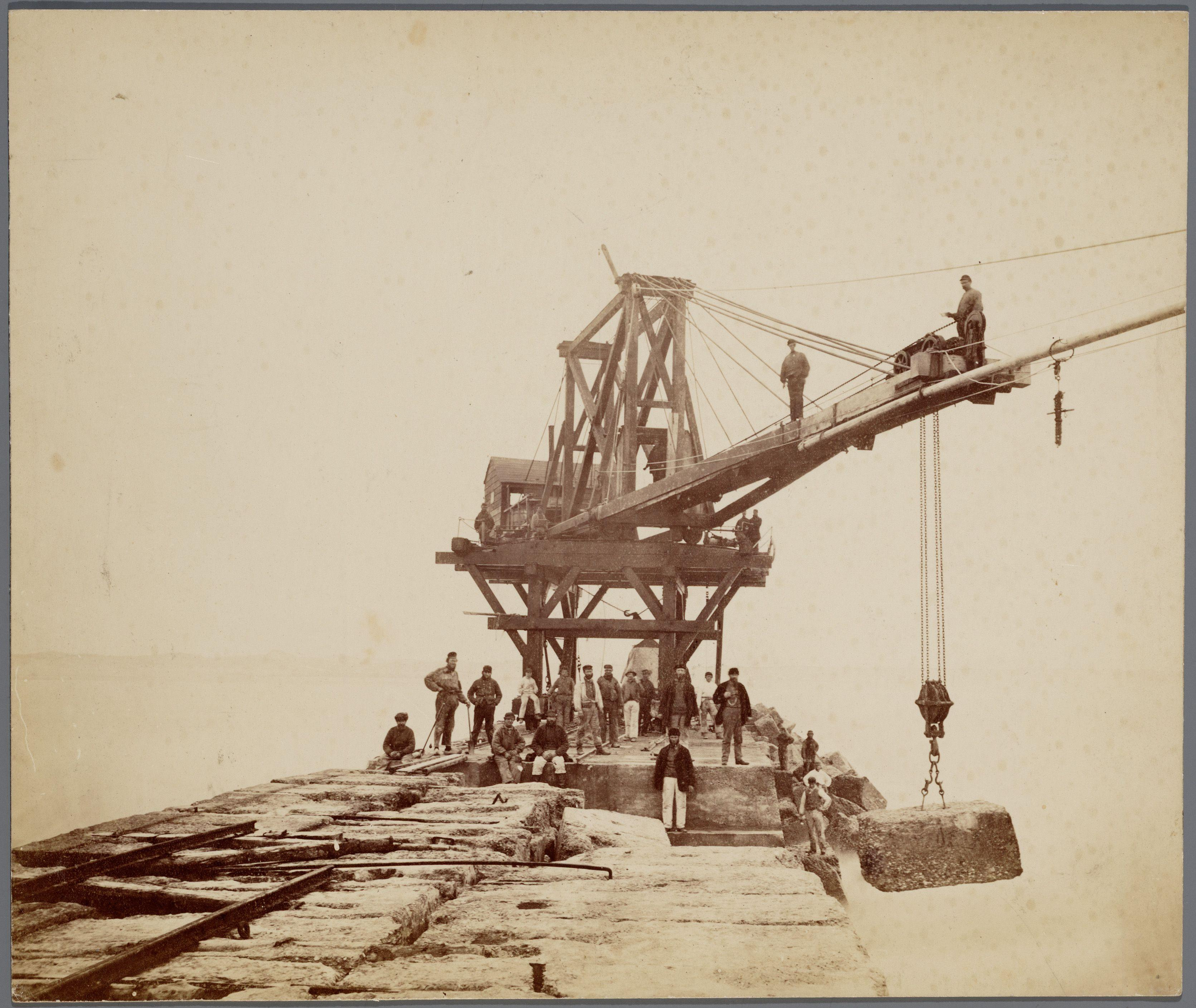
Placing concrete blocks in the breakwater at IJmuiden

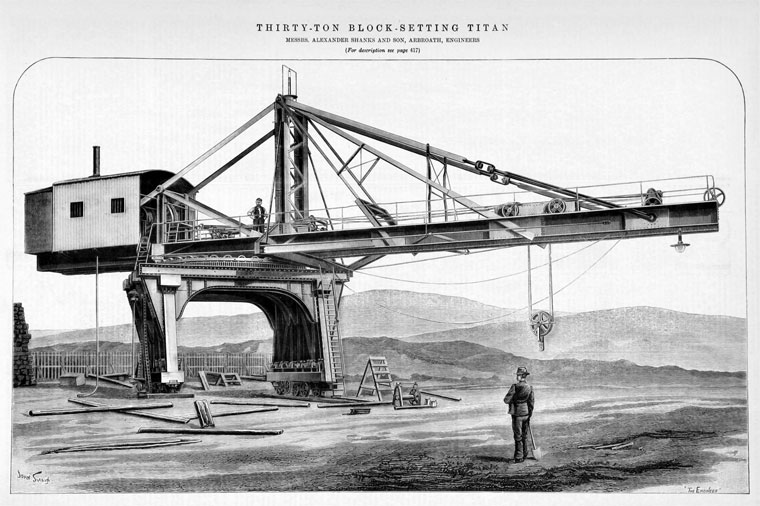
Alexander Shanks's 30 ton Hercules crane for Liepāja

Early examples were built by Stothert & Pitt for the Breakwater Crane Railway, Douglas Harbour, Isle of Man and by Alexander Shanks & Son for Liepāja in Latvia, then part of Russia, and a 50 ton crane for Roker Pier, Sunderland. At Roker, a second separate Goliath (gantry) crane was provided at the rail head, for loading the granite blocks from the railway to the tramway along the pier.

=== Titan ===
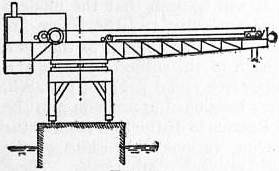
Small Titan or hammerhead crane

The ultimate development of the dedicated block-setting crane was the hammerhead or 'giant cantilever' Titan crane. These had a deep double truss as a cantilever beam atop a large diameter roller bearing, on a carriage similar to that of the Hercules. The upper edges of the two trusses formed a set of rails for a moveable trolley carrying the lifting cable sheaves and hook. The cantilever also extended behind the bearing, carrying the winch engine and also acting as a counterweight. Some also winched this counterpoise weight back and forth as the lifting trolley racked back and forth, in order to balance the changing moment of the load at each radius.

The term 'Titan' had been applied to a number of earlier large cranes. Parkes' Titan at Manora was one of the first, although was missing an important feature. Some of the Hercules type cranes, with a cable-stayed jib supported by a kingpost, were termed 'Titans', if they were capable of slewing in a full circle.

William Arrol built 14 of these large Titan cranes, several of them as block-setters and the rest as shipyard cranes.

Arrol cranes

- Dockyard

- Titan Clydebank, completed in 1907
- Titan Crane, Fairfield, completed in 1911
- Titan Crane, James Watt Dock Crane, completed in 1917
- Titan Crane, Barclay Curle, completed in 1920
- Garden Island, Sydney, Australia

- Blocksetter

- Travelling Titan (South African Harbours and Railways); for use at Durban, completed prior to 1932
- Travelling Hercules (South African Harbours and Railways); for use at Table Bay, completed prior to 1932
- Travelling Hercules; for use at Ceuta, completed prior to 1932
- Portland Breakwater, Dorset

The following diesel crane was actually built by Skoda in 1931.

- Comodoro Rivadavia pier, Argentina

=== Later jib cranes ===
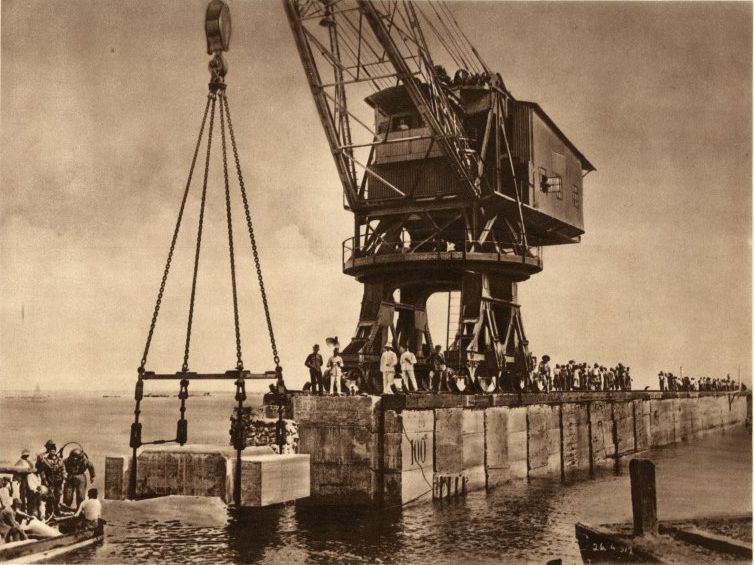
An electric port crane by Nagel & Kaemp in Maputo, used for breakwater construction. Note the interlocking pre-cast concrete blocks.

By the 1920s, port cranes had developed to become much more powerful - particularly when electrically driven, for which Stothert & Pitt were again leaders. A port crane is required to make many lifts, as fast as possible, and so requires powerful (Note: 'Power' is the product of force and speed, so a machine is powerful if it is either capable of great force, or of a moderate force at high speed.) motors even if their lifting capacity is not so great. Electric cranes, supplied by electricity from a single centralised generating station or prime mover, could offer a lot of power per crane, without requiring the high cost of an equivalent steam plant on each crane.

Port cranes were almost all luffing jib cranes, often with a long reach. Their lifting capacity depended on how far they were reaching. Although not intended for lifting heavy loads, when the jib was raised high and the crane worked at a short radius, their capacity could become comparable to a block-setting crane.

When an existing harbour was to be extended or maintained, it was now possible to use one of the existing port cranes for this work. This only required new lines to be laid along the breakwater and a longer cable supplied to power one of the existing cranes, moved into position for this work. Obviously this was far cheaper than obtaining another specialist crane just for this work.

== Working life ==
In their heyday, block-setting cranes were sold on from completed sites and used elsewhere. Two cranes returned to the UK for further use; a S&P Titan of 1900 for Seaham went on to Malta and thence to the Proof Testing Establishment at Shoeburyness in 1921; and a S&P Titan of 1901 from Simonstown went to Aberdeen in 1937. They were dismantled for shipping and might even be designed to make this simpler, with bolted joints to break the crane down into components, each of which was permanently assembled by rivetting. Some cranes were only partly re-used, the more complicated and expensive parts also being the most compact. The steam plant and moving parts could be removed and re-used, whilst the large but relatively simple framework was scrapped in situ and a new one built for the new site. A single crane might construct several breakwaters in its working life.

In later years, such cranes were in less demand and so the crane might be left in place, and available in the future for any maintenance work needed.

=== Tynemouth Pier ===
As an example, Tynemouth Pier had three cranes permanently in place at various times. The two breakwaters were constructed under the supervision of P. J. Messent (1830-1897) "the maker of the Tyne River". The first crane was used to rebuild the North pier and breakwater in 1909 and remained in service afterwards until 1931. The next crane was a steam-powered Titan hammerhead, which lasted to the late 1960s. The breakwater here also formed a pier on its landward side. Although not used for commercial cargoes, it was sometimes used for ship repair, such as lifting engines in and out. It was replaced by a more modern electric crane after this, which lasted into the 1990s.

== Models ==
=== Meccano ===
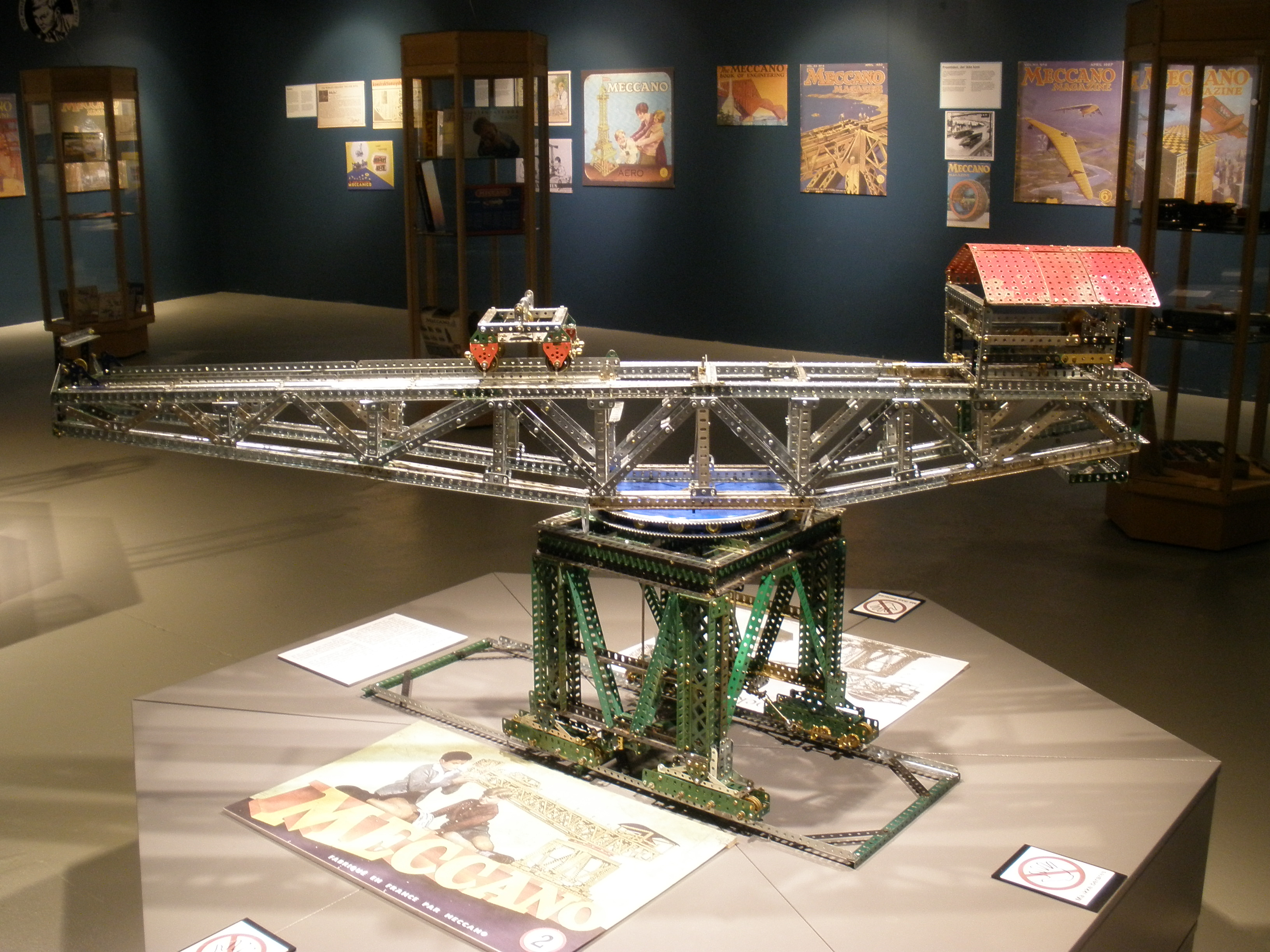
The Meccano Giant Block-Setting Crane

Cranes have always been a popular subject for Meccano models and large Titan cranes in particular. They have appeared in instruction guides, as shop display models, and as one-off constructions by dedicated Meccanistes.

==== Nº 4 Super Models ====
The instructions of ' Meccano Super Models No. 4.' were for a 'Giant Block-Setting Crane'. These instructions were printed in 1929, firstly across three issues of the Meccano Magazine. They were then reprinted in booklet form. This model required the resources of the largest Meccano set, the wooden-cased No 10 set, and so few Meccano modellers would have had the resources to build it. Even with that set, it required an additional component – the part 167 Geared Roller Bearing. This model remains a popular goal for large Meccano builders.

==== Illustration ====
The block-setting crane model was such an icon of Meccano that it was used as cover art for several publications: the 1930 Book of New Models, the 1947 No 3 set, and the post-war revised No 7, 8, 9 & 10 sets. This was despite none of these sets containing enough parts, or the roller bearing, with which to build it. The crane is widely known as the 'Pinyon' block setter, after the name of the illustrator who produced the cover artwork.
