= Nizza, Frankfurt =

Park in Frankfurt, Germany

Coordinates: 50.1044°N 8.6707°E

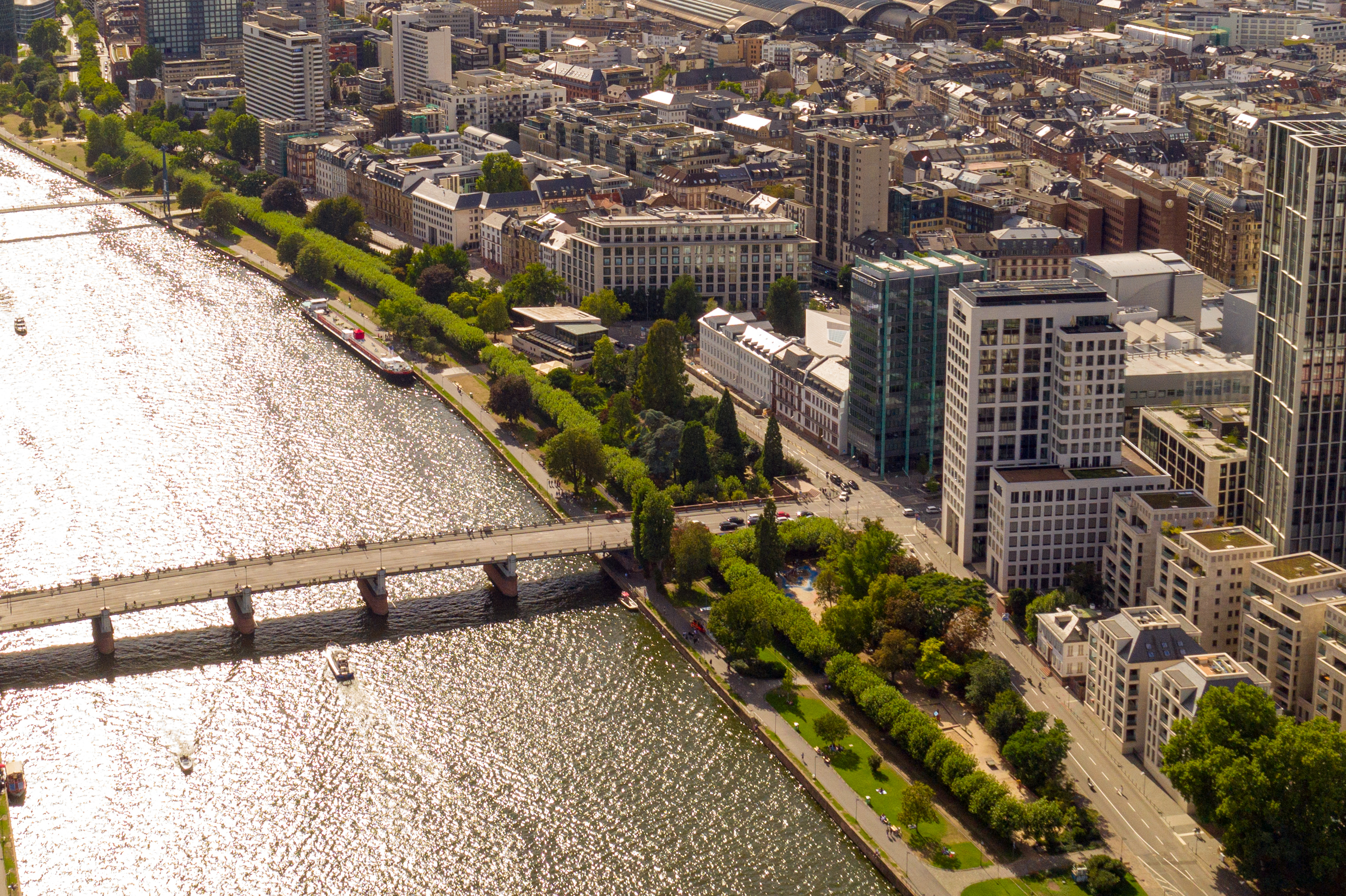
An aerial photo of central Frankfurt, showing Nizza in the centre.

Nizza ([ˈnɪtsaː], from the Italian and German name for the French city of Nice) is a small area in central Frankfurt-am-Main, Germany, known for its microclimate that makes it one of the warmest places in Germany. Nizza is on the northern bank of the River Main, and the combination of its open southern-facing position, the urban heat island, the high walls of the adjacent promenade which act as a windbreak, and reflection of sunlight off the water combine to produce a Mediterranean climate. At 4.42 hectares (10.9 acres), Nizza is one of the largest gardens of Mediterranean plants north of the Alps.

== Location ==
Nizza is located on the north bank of the Main and stretches from the Friedensbrücke bridge to the Untermainbrücke bridge, across the Bahnhofsviertel (Railway Station Quarter), Innenstadt (Inner City), and Altstadt (Old Town) districts. An avenue of plane trees runs along the length of the Nizza river bank, alongside the Frankfurt City Link Line railway. The western part of Nizza includes the preserved Herkules crane, formerly part of the Frankfurt harbour, and is crossed by the Holbeinsteg bridge. The central part of Nizza includes the Main-Nizza restaurant and a landscaped Mediterranean garden. The eastern end of Nizza, on the other side of the Untermainbrücke, includes a water playground for children.

Nizza is an important link between Frankfurt's tourist attractions. It is at the end of the Wallanlagen park and runs parallel to the Museumsufer cluster of museums. The Jewish Museum Frankfurt lies alongside Nizza, and the Oper Frankfurt opera house and Schauspiel Frankfurt theatre are behind it. In the river cruise and trade fair season, up to 6 hotelships can moor along Nizza quay.

== History ==
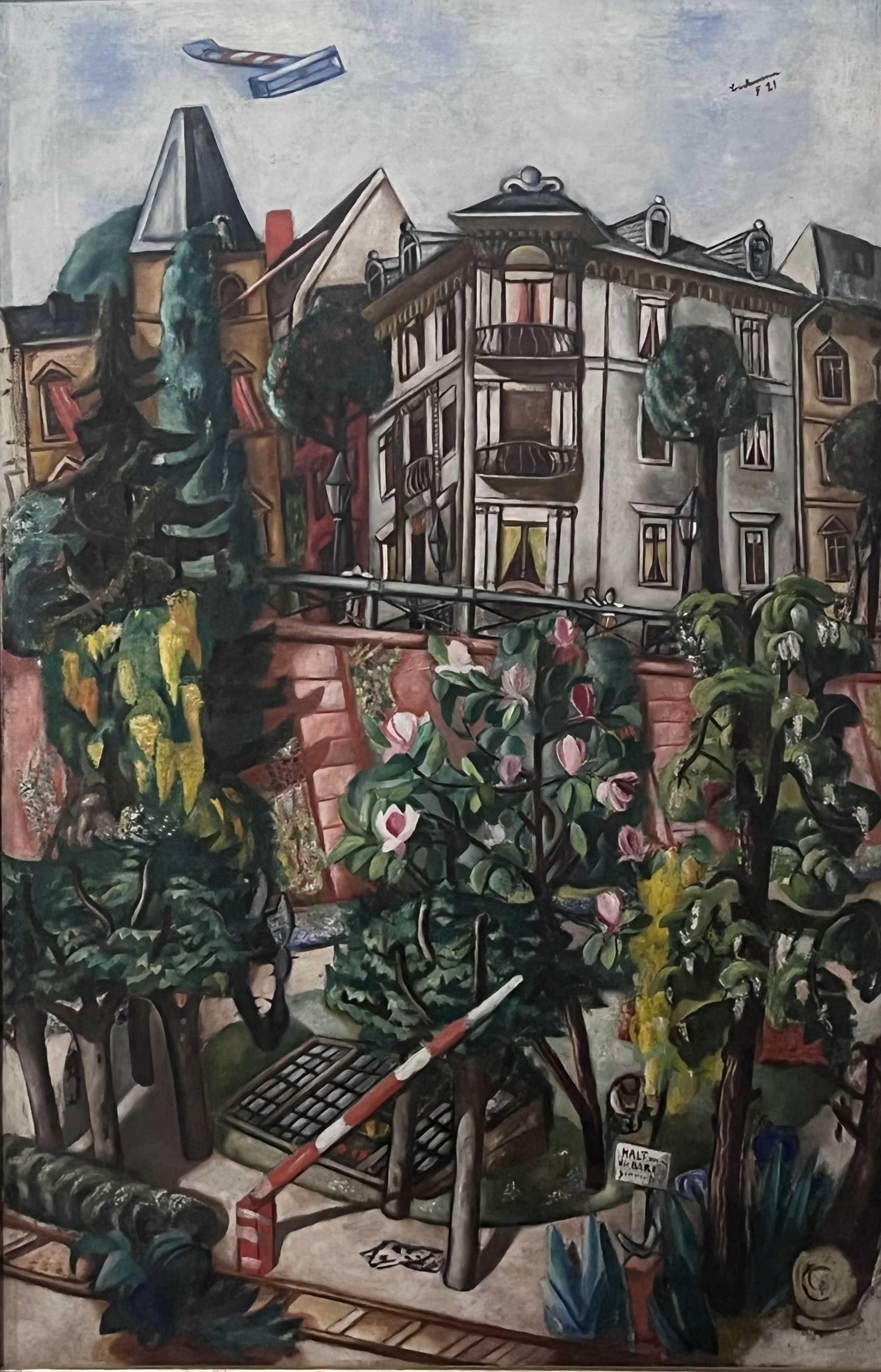
Nizza in 1921, painted by Max Beckmann.

The area that is now Nizza was originally a river island. It was connected to the mainland in 1858 when the construction of the Frankfurt Harbour Railway saw the arm of the river filled in. Its location close to the end of the Wallanlagen (the site of the former city walls, which were converted into a public park in the 19th century) made it a natural site to connect these parks to the river.

In 1875, the site was redesigned as a tropical garden, being named Nizza in tribute to the Mediterranean city of Nice (Nizza in German), and was also used as an open-air swimming pool. Initially, the plants had to be housed in greenhouses during the winter, but in 2000–2005 Nizza was replanted under the oversight of Rainer Gesell-Schulte with frost resistant Mediterranean plants, allowing them to remain in the garden year-round without the need for an orangery.

== Climate ==
Nizza is one of the warmest places in Germany and has a Mediterranean climate. Several effects combine to produce the local microclimate: Frankfurt is already one of the warmest locations in Germany due to the urban heat island effect. Nizza is on the north bank of the River Main, meaning it receives direct sun from the south, with additional exposure from sunlight reflected off the river. The high walls of the neighbouring Untermainkai promenade and Untermainbrücke also act as a windbreak.

Using weather observations from a nearby courtyard garden, Gesell-Schulte found a microclimate 4.5–6.5 °C (8.1–11.7 °F) warmer than surrounding areas. The area can see up to 300 frost-free days per year, and temperatures rarely drop below −5.5 °C (22.1 °F). This allows many types of frost-resistant plants to thrive.

== Plants ==
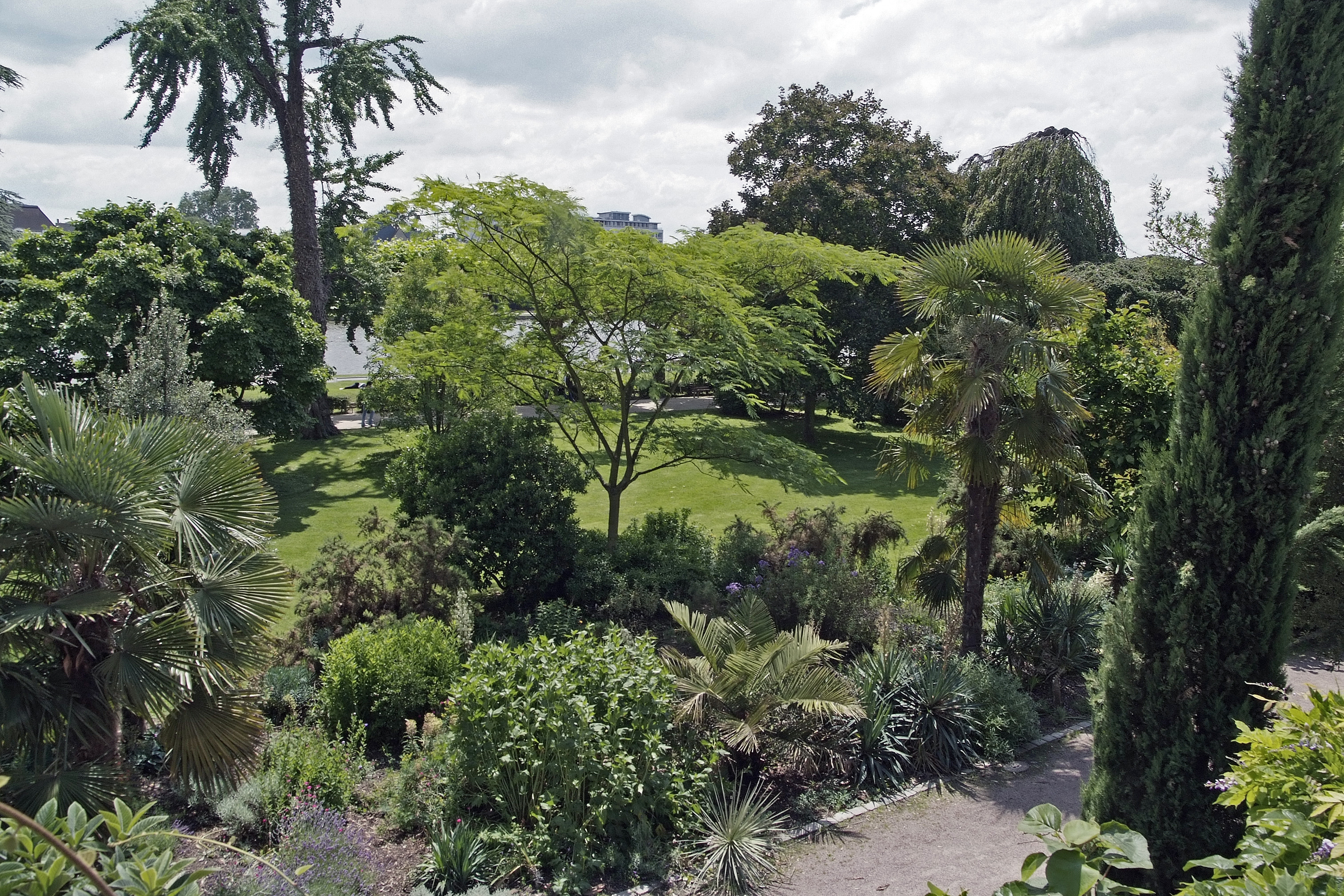
A garden of Mediterranean plants including palms in Nizza.

Gesell-Schulte drew particularly on the flora of the Italian Riviera to find suitable plants. Some were also imported from France, the Netherlands and the United States. Many were chosen on the basis of being in the collection of the Palmengarten, a major botanical garden nearby in the Westend district of Frankfurt.

Nizza is extensively planted with Mediterranean and other subtropical plants. These include olives, figs, bananas, cork, kiwis, citrus, cypress, stone pines, loquat and palm trees, as well as large sequoia, eucalyptus, and magnolia, and herbs including sage, rosemary, and thyme.
