= Hercules crane =

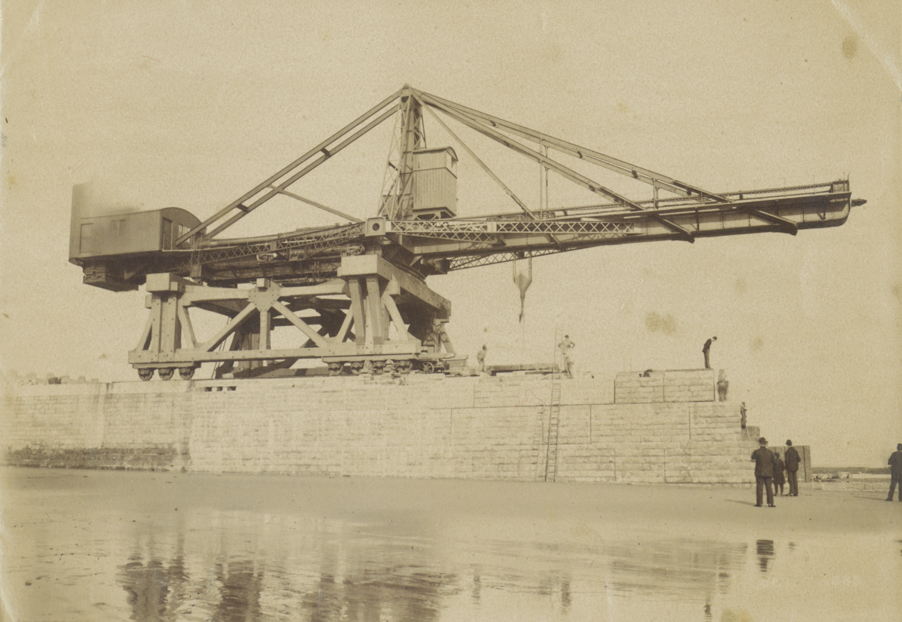
Building Roker Pier, Sunderland, 1895

A Hercules crane was a form of block-setting crane, developed in the 1870s. They were characterised by a wheeled, mobile gantry running on rails, surmounted by a slewing horizontal jib, held up by a kingpost.

== Block-setting cranes ==
Block-setting cranes were large cranes developed in the mid-Victorian era. They were used for installing the large stone blocks used to build breakwaters and stone piers. They could lift a heavy stone block and place it precisely, with a long jib reaching beyond the base of the crane. Several types of such crane were developed, with progressively greater reach, lifting capacity and ability to move their load sideways. The greater the load, the larger blocks could be placed at one time and so the faster a breakwater could be built. The greater their reach, the more work could be done before needing to move the carriage of the crane.

== Hercules design ==
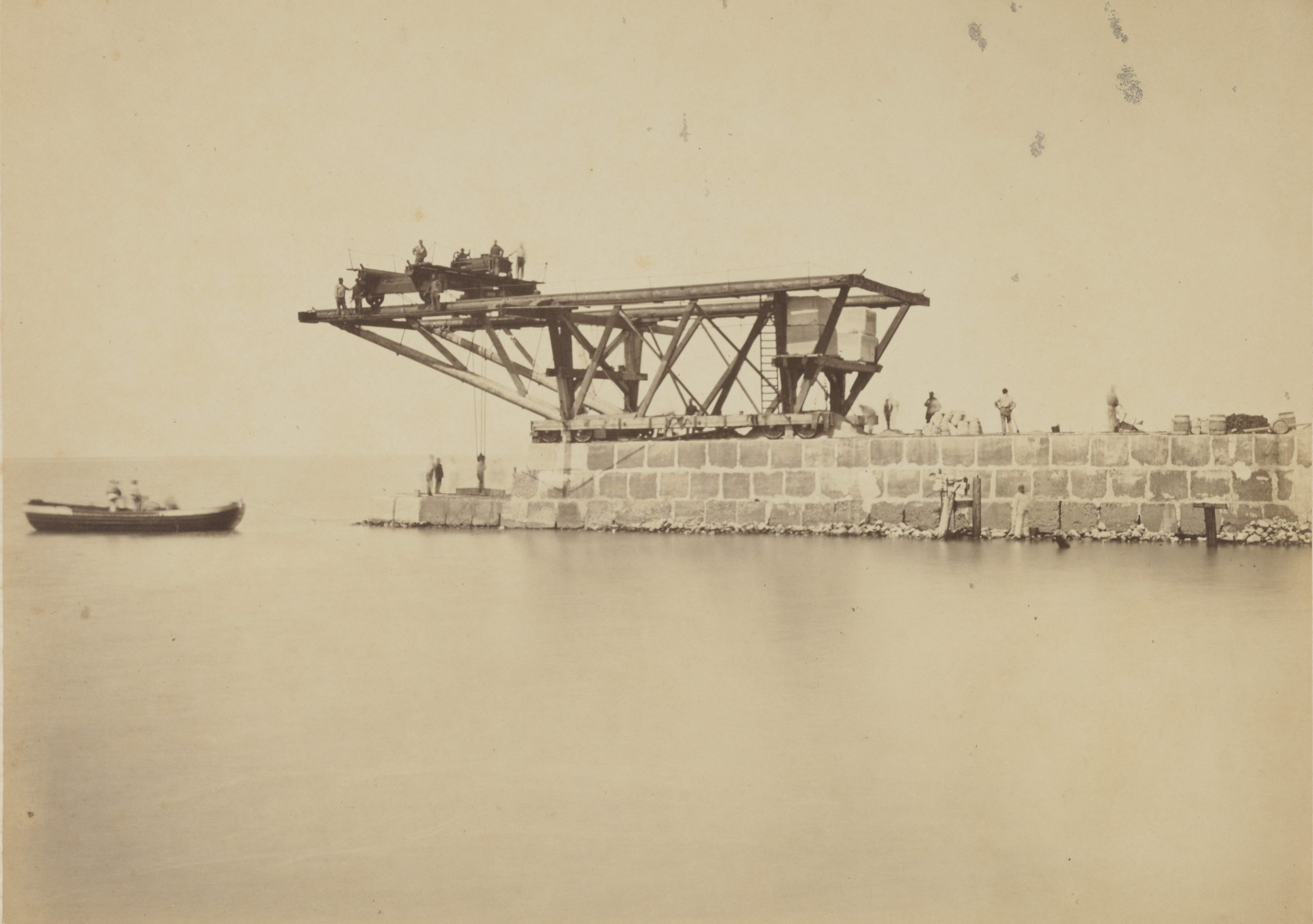
A Manora-type crane, used for construction of the mouth of the North Sea Canal, circa 1865

In the late-1860s, a further development of the block-setting crane design took place, the Hercules crane. A crane was needed which could set larger and heavier blocks, up to 30 tons.

The Hercules design combined aspects of both the earlier fixed-jib gantry cranes built for works at Manora and that would later be used for a slewing jib crane at Port Alfred. A horizontal jib was added, with the ability to slew sideways.

A horizontal non-luffing jib (Note: A luffing jib is pivoted at its base, so that the far end may be raised and lowered.) was used, separate from the lower frame. This was supported on two carriages which could move sideways independently on curved tracks, thus allowing the jib to slew sideways over a small angle. For building linear breakwaters, this small slew angle was enough. With the load of these larger blocks, it was not yet possible to use a convenient central-pivot kingpost bearing, and full-circle slewing, as would be used for the much smaller Port Alfred crane. Although the mechanical design of the jib was as a kingpost truss, this kingpost was part of the jib and rotated with it, rather than fixed to the frame beneath it. The rest of the design continued the Manora type, with a lower frame of the crane which allowed blocks to pass through it on wagons. The crane was powered by a semi-portable steam engine in a small cabin at the rear of the jib, also helping as a counterweight.

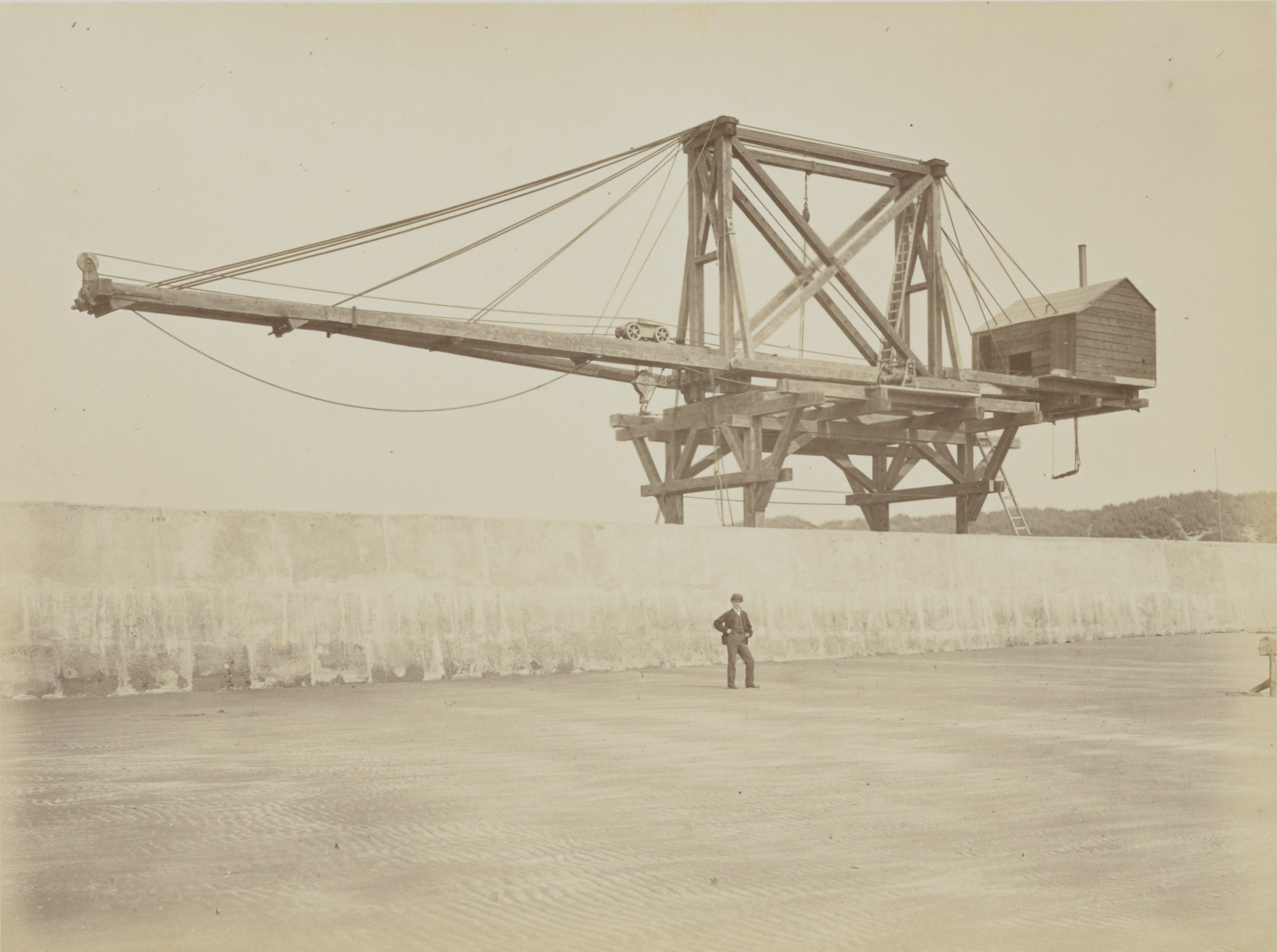
1871 timber queen post truss jib, for the North Sea Canal

Construction of the Dutch Noordzeekanaal from 1865 to 1876 used a variety of cranes, including two significant examples of the Hercules type. Having little stone available nearby, shaped concrete blocks were cast on-site. These allowed a more sophisticated shaping than was economic with stone, and large interlocking blocks could be used. However this also required a crane with greater lifting capacity. Two large breakwaters were constructed at the sea mouth at IJmuiden and the Zuiderhoofd and sea wall dyke at Westkapelle.

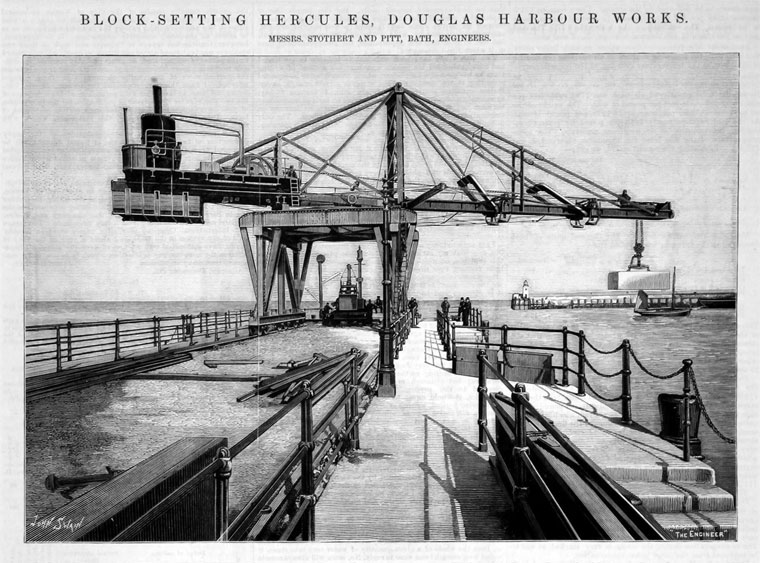
Douglas Harbour Breakwater, c. 1888

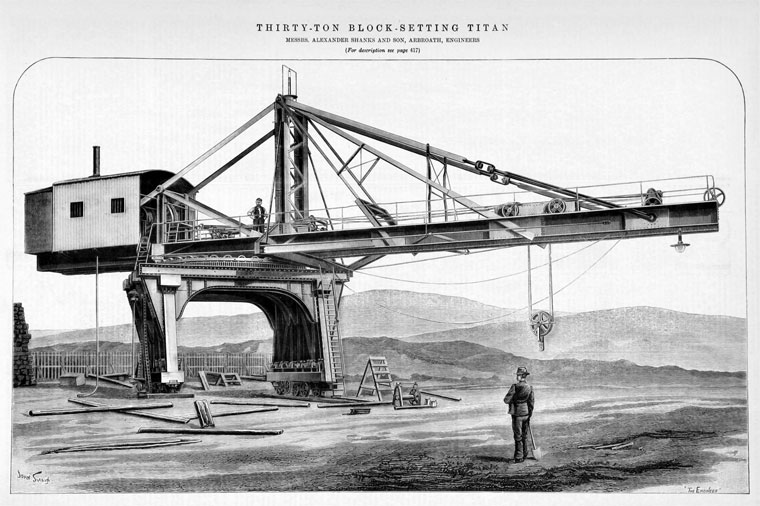
Alexander Shanks's 30 ton Hercules crane for Liepāja

Further examples were built by Stothert & Pitt for the Breakwater Crane Railway, Douglas Harbour, Isle of Man, by Alexander Shanks & Son for Liepāja in Latvia, then part of Russia, and a 50-ton crane for Roker Pier, Sunderland. These introduced full-circle slewing, with the jib carriages running on a circular track. The jib could now be slewed to the side of the breakwater, which at Douglas was used to allow the unloading of ships tied up alongside. As the kingpost of these cranes was part of the jib, but not part of the slewing bearing, it was placed further outboard, at the edge of the slewing track or large ring bearing, rather than on the pixot axis, as for Port Alfred. This makes the most of the truss' span for increasing the reach of the jib.

== See also ==
- Goliath crane
- Mammoth crane
