= Hotelship =

Ship used as a portable hotel

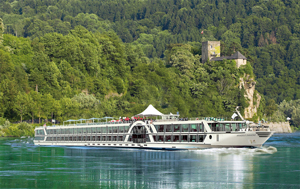
The river cruiser Amadeus Diamond is one of the hotel ships at German trade fairs.

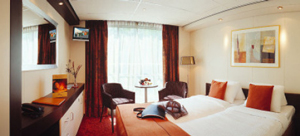
Standard cabin on hotelship Amadeus Diamond

A hotel ship is a passenger ship which is used for a period as a hotel. A botel or boatel is a boat that serves as a hotel or hostel. Currently there are few permanent hotel ships. The word is a portmanteau of boat and hotel. Botels may range from small or larger purpose-built or converted boats or other watercraft, to converted ships. They may be permanently moored or grounded, or spend part of the year taking guests on tours. The most famous examples are the Queen Mary, in Long Beach; and the Queen Elizabeth 2, in Dubai. Both ships were originally part of the Cunard line. During the 2022 World Cup, Qatar chartered three cruise ships to mitigate accommodation shortages.

== United States ==
There are two permanently moored hotel ships in the United States. The Queen Mary is in Long Beach, California, and the former Lake Michigan car ferry City of Milwaukee is used seasonally as a hotel in Manistee, Michigan.

== Japan ==
The ocean liner and museum ship Hikawa Maru in Yokohama includes facilities for hotel accommodation.

== Netherlands ==
The former ocean liner Rotterdam is currently serving as a hotel and museum in Rotterdam.

== Finland ==
The former cruise ship and carferry Bore is serving as a hotel, museum and restaurant in Turku.

== Germany ==
At times when accommodation shortages can be predicted, for example during trade fairs or big events, hotelships can complement the already existing permanent hotels in a flexible fashion. In Germany, hotelships are evident during trade fair periods in Frankfurt, Cologne, Düsseldorf, Nuremberg and Hannover.

The moorings are usually located near the town centre. During a large trade fair such as Drupa or Medica in Düsseldorf, up to 40 ships can be moored to accommodate visitors.

River cruisers are used as hotelships for a limited time and intermittently. Whereas a hotel has a fixed address and is used permanently, hotelships are only in any one location for a defined duration. Ship owners and shipping companies are particularly keen on this use of river cruisers as, unlike in the case of deep sea cruise ships, there is no seasonal transfer of ships to warmer areas. The result is therefore more efficient use of the ships outside the main cruising season.

The main thoroughfares for river cruises in Europe are the rivers Rhine, Main, Danube and Elbe. Since many cities here lie directly on the river, this is also a particularly interesting area for hotelships. Moorings are usually conveniently located in the city centre, for example at the Konrad Adenauer Ufer in Cologne, the Altstadtufer in Düsseldorf or the Holbeinsteg at Nizza, Frankfurt. These locations are all close to the city centres and the trade fair grounds. Because of this network of inland waterways, hotelships can be positioned where and when required, and usually without lengthy transfers.

=== Background ===
The origins of hotelships in Germany can be traced back to the 1970s. During international trade fairs it was often difficult to find good quality accommodation in a convenient location because of shortages of hotel rooms. During the International Textile Trade Fair in Frankfurt, the idea was born to moor a river cruiser on the banks of the Main and thus increase bed capacity in the city centre. Even today, the Frankfurt am Main harbour authorities offer moorings for hotelships on the Nizza Werft.

During the last 10 years, river cruises in Europe have become a growth area of the tourism industry. Since the completion of the Rhine-Main-Danube Canal, the fall of the Iron Curtain and the expansion of the EU, there has been a huge increase in the potential for river cruising as part of the cruising industry. River cruising has become more comfortable and so has increased in popularity, allowing it to compete with European coach tours. As a result, there has been a steady increase in the number of ships available in recent years and therefore the availability of cruise ships for use as hotelships has also increased.

Another reason for the increased use of hotelships is the huge peak in demand for hotel rooms in trade fair cities. Local hotels demanding heavily increased prices during trade fair events has recently led to cutbacks in trade fairs or even their complete withdrawal. Many visitors have stayed away or just come for the day and have been able to do so because of reduced transport costs with budget airlines or ICE train connections. Hotelships redress the balance during these temporary peaks and, in spite of criticism from local hotels, help make trade fair locations more attractive and more competitive.

=== The market ===
Hotelships operate as a balance in the hotel market where the market is too inflexible to react to periods of high demand such as is the case during trade fairs. Additional capacity through the construction of new hotels is not always possible and indeed not always desirable since in times of low demand outside the trade fair season, this creates excess capacity. The introduction of hotelships takes account of this situation and helps to balance occasional high demand with supply.

Hotelships are usually marketed by charter agencies who make use of accommodation made available by shipping companies such as Viking River Cruises from Luxembourg, or private independent shipping companies. Their role is to charter ships and position them in the relevant cities whilst at the same time ensuring and maintaining agreed standards. The charterers keep in close contact with trade fair organisations and tourist offices in the relevant cities in order to provide hotelships as and when required. Hotelships are therefore seen as a way of accommodating more trade fair visitors in the city, rather than in outlying areas. Guests include individual clients as well as companies who usually book their hotel accommodation via specialist travel agencies or directly with the local tourist office. During the 6-month season in 2008, hotelships in Germany boosted the market with an extra 100,000 beds and their turnover was about 10,000,000 Euros. This only represents a small part of the total hotel capacity in Germany. Berlin alone, for example, has a daily capacity of 97,441 beds (figures from December 2008).

== China ==
During the COVID-19 pandemic, river cruise ships were used to provide nearly 1,500 beds for medical workers in the worst affected city, Wuhan.

== Sweden ==
The Viking is a converted sailing ship floated in Sweden.

== Indonesia ==
Former cruise ship Doulos Phos currently operates as a hotel in Bintan.

== United Arab Emirates ==
The Former ocean liner Queen Elizabeth 2 currently operates as a hotel in Dubai.

== Gallery ==
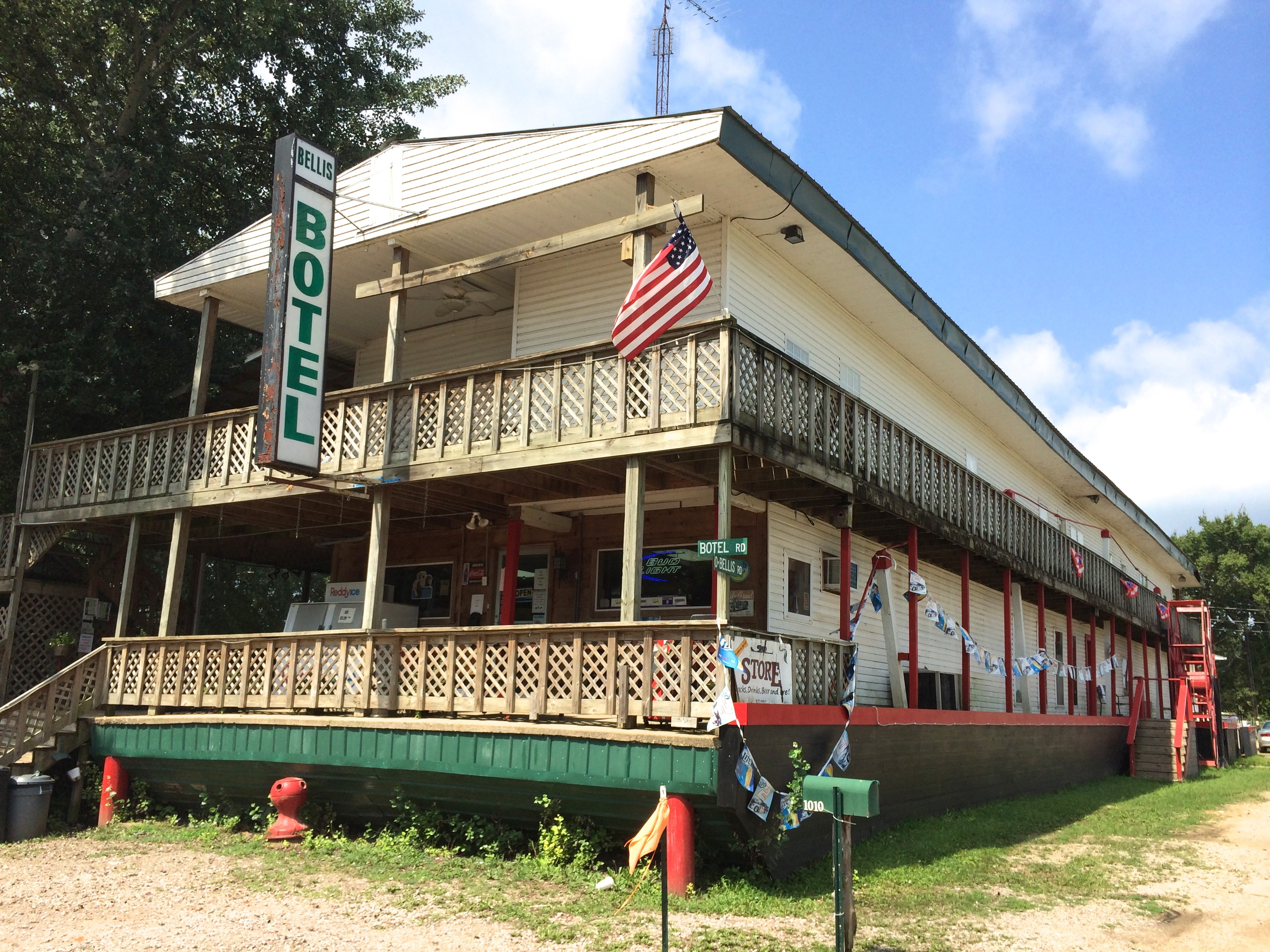
The Bellis Botel at Pickwick Landing on the Tennessee River in Hardin County, Tennessee.

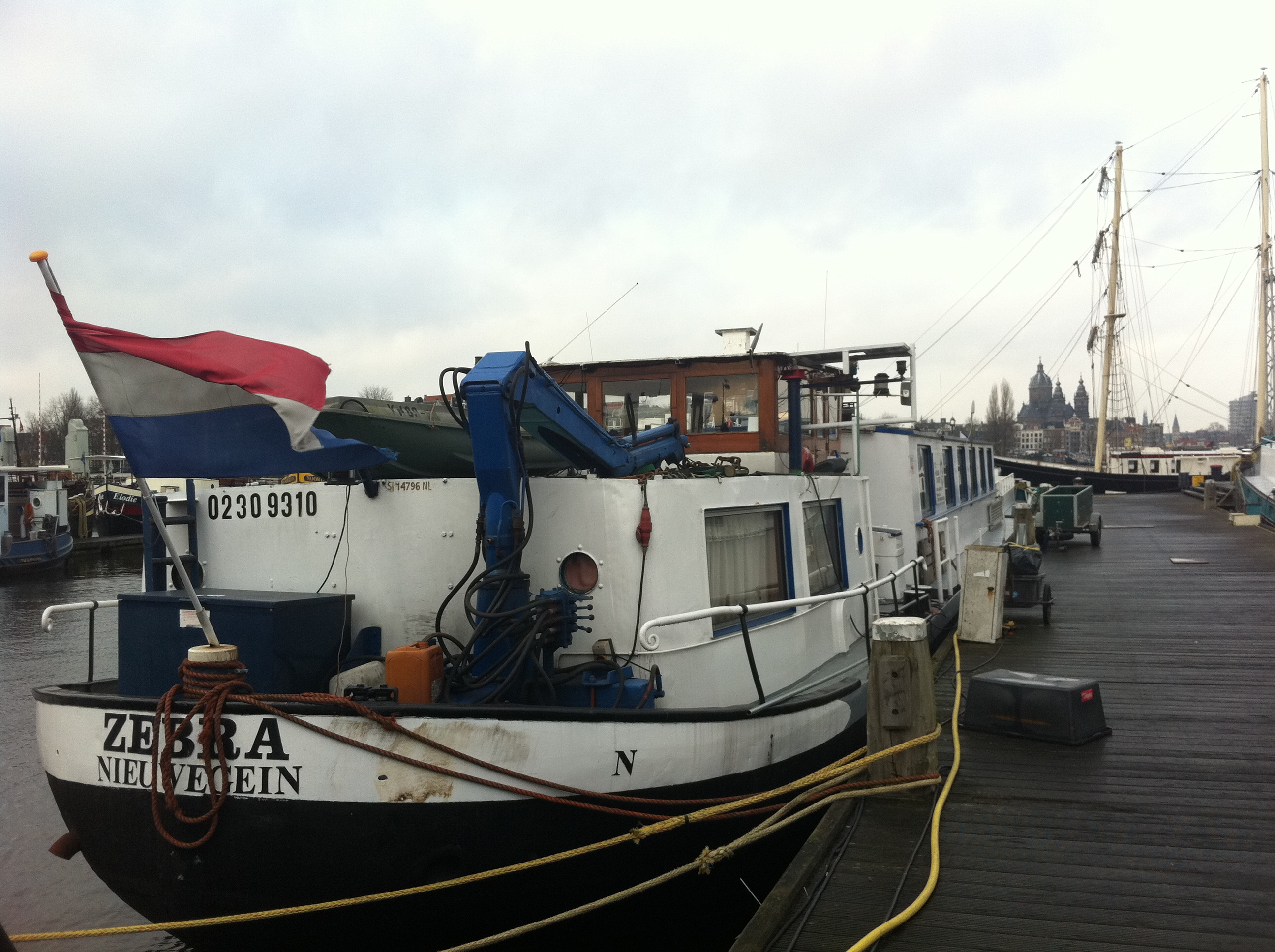
Botel Zebra in Amsterdam.

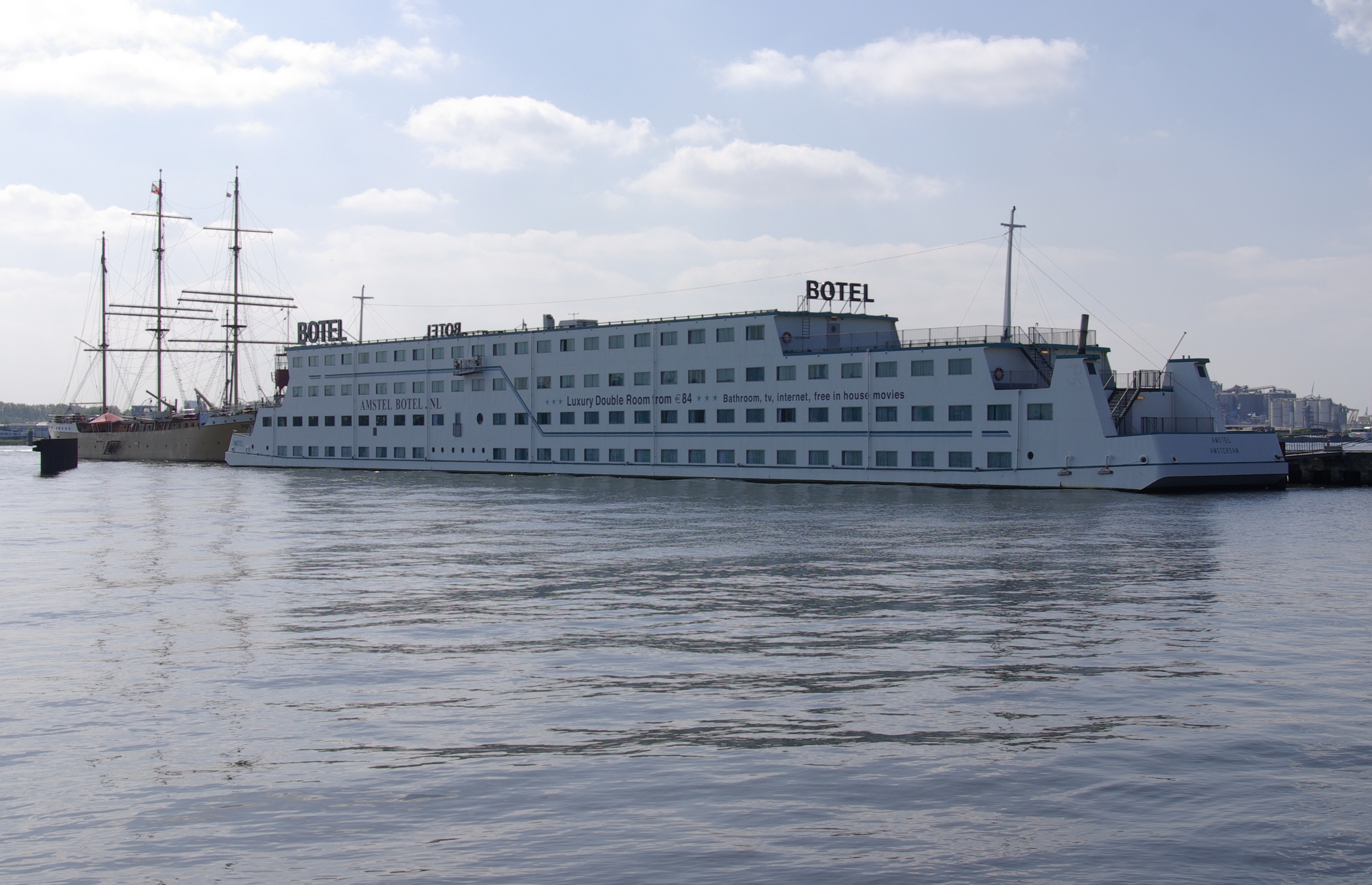
Amstel Botel in Amsterdam.

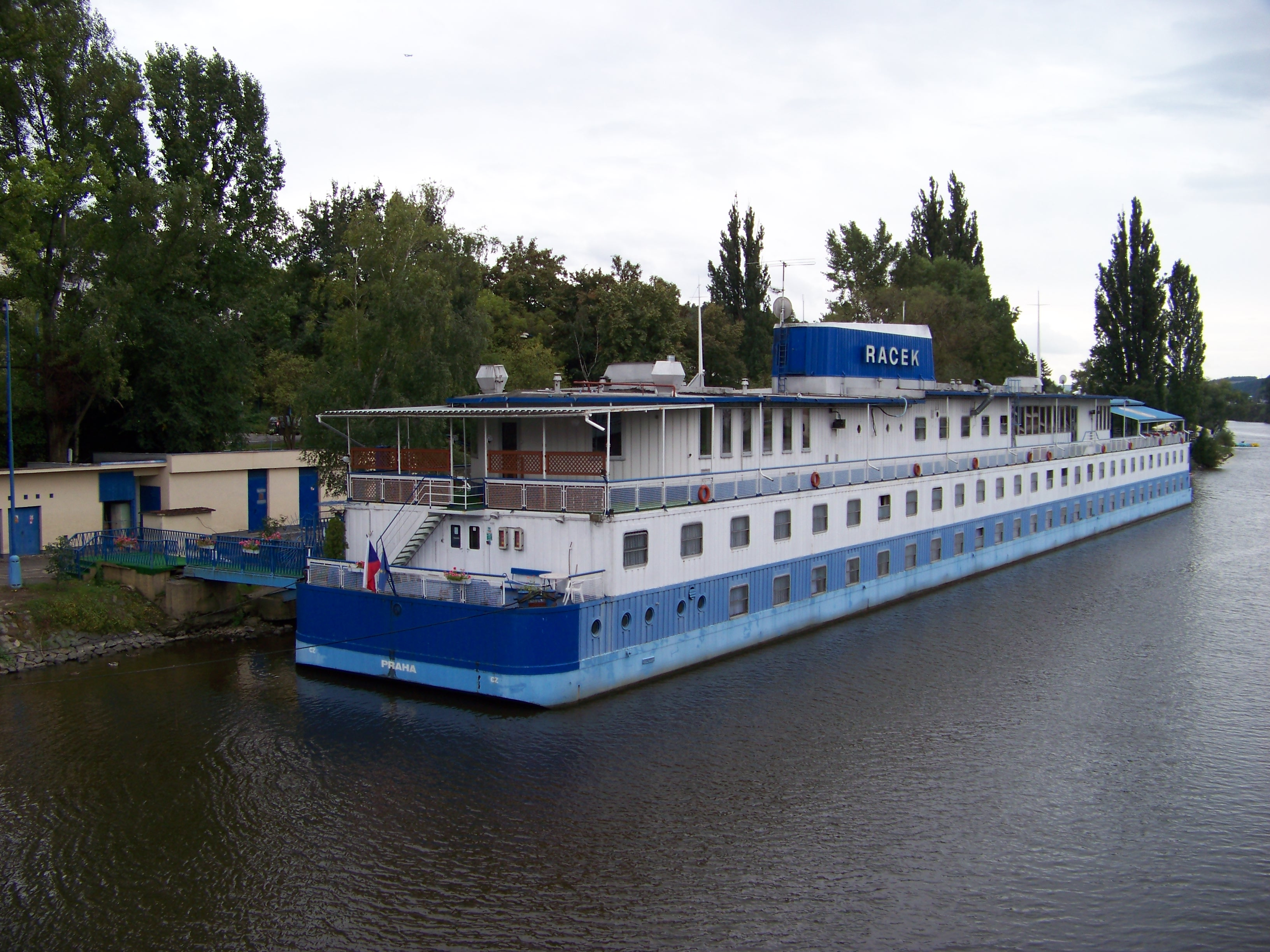
Botel Racek ("Seagull") in Prague.

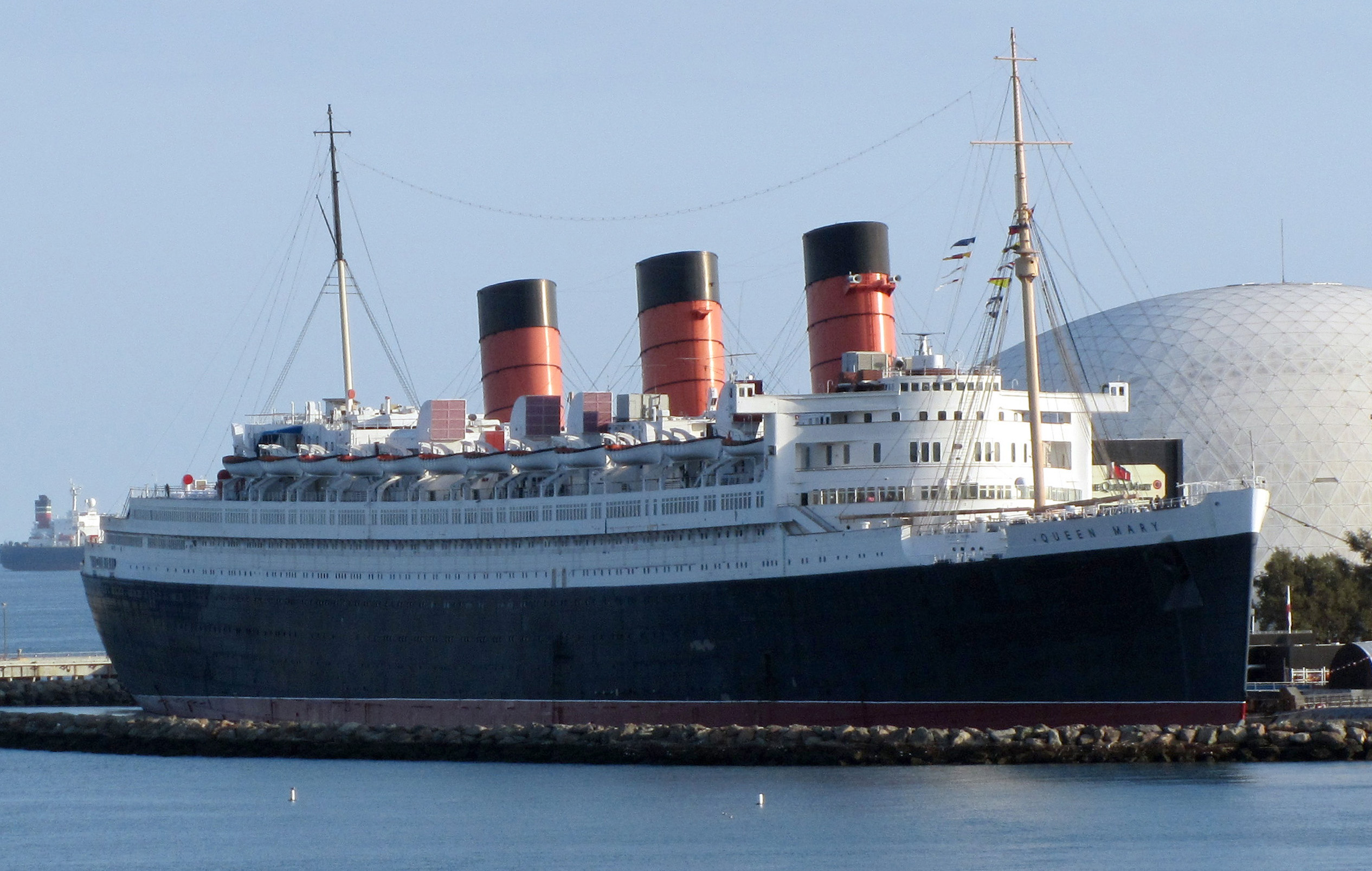
Queen Mary in Long Beach, California.

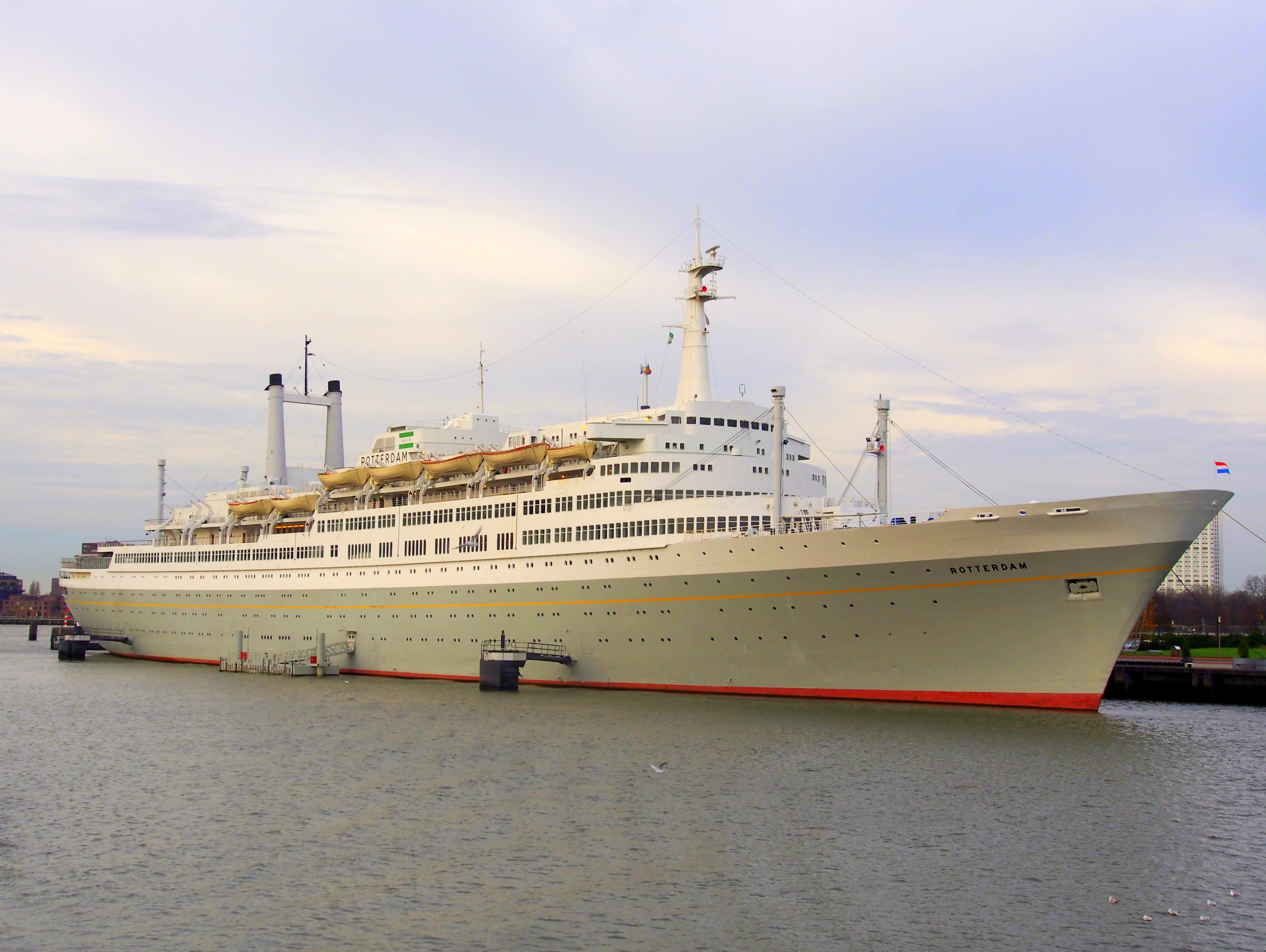
Rotterdam as she is today, permanently moored as a hotel and museum.

== See also ==
- Houseboat
- Flotel
- TWA Hotel
