= Breakwater Crane Railway =

Coordinates: 54.158°N 4.474°W

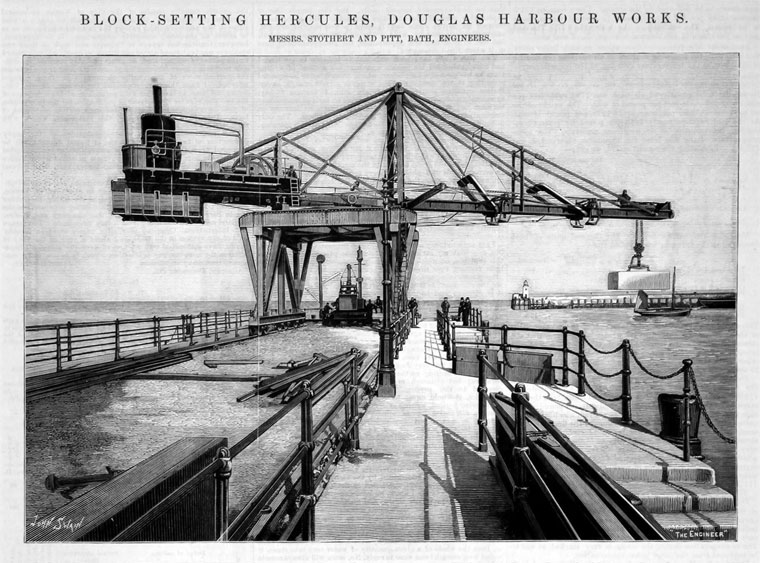
The original 1888 crane

The Douglas Breakwater Crane Railway was a massive self-propelled steam block-setting crane, with a capacity of 15 tons, built by Stothert & Pitt of Bath that ran the length of the original breakwater at Douglas, also used for the loading and unloading of vessels.

A later crane was built by Cowans, Sheldon of Carlisle (capacity 25 tons; carried on two four-wheel bogies; Works number 9057 of 1948 to Drawing 18087). The crane was owned by the Isle of Man Harbour Board and ran on 10 ft (3,048 mm) gauge.
