= Goliath crane =

There are a number of shipyard cranes called Goliath around the world:

- Goliath (Mangalia), in Romania
- Samson and Goliath (cranes) in Northern Ireland
- Goliath (Rosyth) in Scotland
- Two Goliath cranes in the shipyard of Port Pipavav in the state of Gujarat in India
- Two Goliath cranes in Meyer Turku shipyard in Turku in Finland
