= Safe Load Indicator =

Warning device for cranes

A Safe Load Indicator (SLI) or an Automatic Safe Load Indicator (ASLI) is a device which is installed on mobile or portal cranes to alert the operator if the lift is exceeding the safe operating range of the machinery. In some cases, the device will physically lock the machinery in circumstances it determines to be unsafe. SLI systems are usually composed of a microprocessor connected to various sensors on the crane itself. The SLI measures the angle and extension of the boom along with the load weight and compares this with the manufacturer's specifications to determine if the lift is safe.

A safe load indicator has the capability of detecting the angle, weight of load lifted, and ground radius of any lifting device. It controls the lifting equipment to the level that it tries to keep the machinery functioning as per the manufacturer's suggested safety charts.

The crane is fitted with multiple sensors, for each of the measured parameters, which are then further displayed in the operator's cabin for his benefit.
