= Painswick Stream =

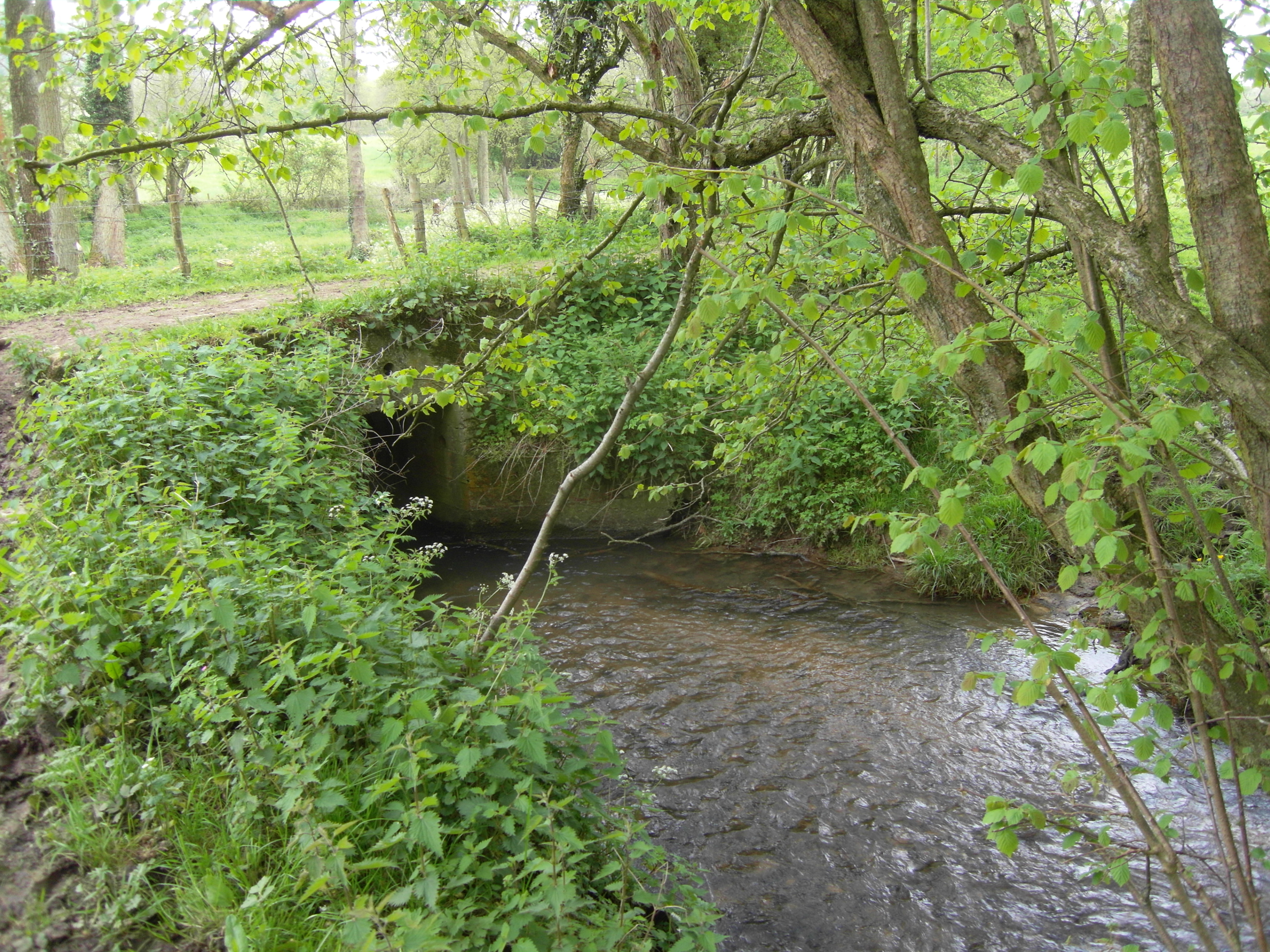
- A bridge carrying a track from Painswick to Sheepscombe over the Painswick Stream

- Location within Gloucestershire

Location
- Country: England
- Counties: Gloucestershire

Physical characteristics
- Source
  - location: Cranham Wood
  - coordinates: 51.8136°N 2.1399°W
- Mouth
  - location: Stroudwater Navigation
  - coordinates: 51.7412°N 2.2299°W
- Length: 6 mi (9.7 km)

Painswick Stream is a small river in Gloucestershire, England. It is a tributary of the River Frome, and flows generally southwards, passing around the village of Painswick and through the town of Stroud. It used to join the Frome at its mouth, but was diverted into the then-derelict Stroudwater Navigation as part of a flood relief scheme in the 1950s. Despite its small size, it has been used to power a significant number of mills, many of which were associated with cloth manufacture until the industry was hit by a series of depressions in the 1820s and 1830s. Some found other uses, being used for grinding corn and for the manufacture of walking sticks and umbrella sticks, another prominent local industry. Many were subsequently demolished, but a number survive which have been granted listed building status.

In Stroud, the river flows through Stratford Park where there is an arboretum, created by the Watts family of brewers. The park has been managed by Stroud District Council since 1936, and two bridges carry a model railway over the river. The Stroudwater Navigation through Stroud has been restored, and the water from the river and from the Slad Brook, which was also diverted into the canal, now powers a water turbine generating electricity, the sale of which helps to fund the maintenance of the canal. The water quality of the river is measured by the Environment Agency, and its ecological status is good, although its chemical status, in common with most rivers in England, is bad, due to the presence of chemicals which had not previously been included in the assessment.

== Route ==
The river rises at a series of springs in Cranham Wood, including the Many Well Springs, close to the 750-foot (230 m) contour. Almost immediately, it enters some ponds, which were once fishponds associated with the medieval Prinknash Abbey. They are located in the grounds of Ladlecombe Cottage, an 18th-century cottage which was remodelled in Arts and Crafts style at the turn of the 20th century. The site has been used for dwellings since the 12th century, and the site was sold to William Todd in 1821, who constructed pleasure grounds and thatched cottages. In 1898 the site was leased to Dr Pruen, who founded the Cotswold Sanatorium there, and the cottage was occupied by doctors until the 1940s. The writer George Orwell corrected the proofs of his novel Nineteen Eighty-Four while he was a patient at the Sanatorium. The stream flows to the west, passing through the village of Cranham, and then gradually turns to the south as it passes Cranham Mill and Sutton's Mill. It then passes Eddell's Mill to reach Tocknell's Court, where a lake has been created by a weir across the stream. Tocknell's Court is a grade II* listed country house, dating from the 1570s and 1640s, with alterations dating from 1716. A little further south, it passes Mill Cottage, an early 18th-century building which was probably associated with a nearby derelict mill. It continues past Damsells Mill, and is joined by the outflow from a lake, fed by springs rising to the east of the river near Beech Farm.

The river runs along the eastern and southern edges of Painswick. Loveday's Mill consists of a 17th-century house with a 19th-century mill building, both with two storeys and an attic. Brookhouse Mill is followed by Capp Mill, where the mill building, dating them the 17th and 19th centuries with 20th-century modifications, has been converted into a cottage. The mill house is older, dating from 1678. Just to the south a large mill pond powered Painswick Mill, where a large mill house remains, dating from the 17th century with 20th-century additions. Nearby are two mill cottages, which are mirror images of each other. The final mill before the stream leaves Painswick is Skinners Mill, where the mill and mill house, dating from the 15th century or possibly earlier, have been converted into two cottages.

To the west of Painswick, the Painswick Stream is joined by Wash Brook, which flows southwards and also powered a number of mills. Immediately below the junction is Kings Mill, The present mill building and house date from the 18th and 19th centuries, but there has been a mill at the site since at least 1495. The river flows along the eastern edge of Pitchcombe, passing Small's Mill and then Wades Mill, where the mill house dates from the early 17th century, although the front elevation was rebuilt in 1820. At Rock Mill, the mill house dates from 1681, when it was built for Edward Gardner. Grove Mill was originally a maltings, where the early 19th century building has been converted into four cottages. After the buildings, the stream is briefly culverted before it enters Salmon's Spring industrial estate, where the clothier's house, which was part of Salmon's Mill at the Salmon's Spring Brewery includes features dated to 1593 and 1607.

After the A46 road crosses the stream, it enters Stratford Park, 56 acres (23 ha) of parkland including a house which was built around 1674 for Giles Gardiner. It was remodelled in the 1780s and reduced from three storeys to two in 1892. From 1819 to 1891, it was owned by two generations of the Watts family, who were brewers in Stroud and were responsible for creating the arboretum. Since 1936 it has been owned by Stroud District Council, and is now known as the Museum in the Park. Within the park, a miniature railway operated by the Stroud Society of Model Engineers crosses Painswick Stream twice. Work began on the track in 1979, and it opened to the public in 1982. The river is then crossed by an early 19th-century cast-iron bridge, the spandrels and balustrade of which are decorated with ornamental circles. A large fish pond lies to the east of the river before it exits from the park, passing under the A4171 road. Stratford corn mill used to be located to the south of the road, but the river is now culverted beneath the car park for a superstore. It emerges into the open air again to be crossed by the Golden Valley line railway, to the west of Stroud railway station. The final crossing is the A419 Cainscross Road, before the river drops over a weir and into the Stroudwater Navigation.

== History ==
The river channel has undergone significant modification as a result of the large number of mills built along its length. At its southern end, it passed under the Stroudwater Navigation to join the River Frome. The Stroudwater Navigation ceased to carry any trade in 1941, although it was not formally abandoned until an Act of Parliament was obtained in 1954. Shortly afterwards, the canal channel through Stroud, which included a small part of the Thames and Severn Canal, which joins the Stroudwater at Wallbridge, was used as part of a flood relief scheme. The top gates of Lower Wallbridge Lock, Foundry Lock and Dudbridge Lock were replaced by concrete weirs, which maintained water levels at normal flows around 3.3 feet (1.0 m) lower than navigable levels had been. Three streams that formerly passed under the canal were diverted into it: Slad Brook (much of which is culverted under Stroud), Painswick Stream and Ruscombe Brook. Then at Ebley, the canal was joined to the river. As a consequence, this part of the canal is classed as a "main river".

As this section of the canal has now been restored and the locks put back into use, designs for reinstatement had to accommodate large flows and included underground bywash culverts, capable of carrying the full flood flow of all three streams. A new weir which carries a towpath bridge was constructed where the water leaves the canal to enter the River Frome, and a set of floodgates was constructed beyond the weir, to protect the canal from high water levels.

== Milling ==
Despite its relatively small size, the Painswick Stream supplied power to a number of mills. Many were known by multiple names over their lifetime, and the names adopted in this article are generally those used on the modern Ordnance Survey map. The area around Stroud was an important centre for the woollen industry between 1750 and 1820, and there were 25 mills on the Painswick Stream and its tributaries involved in cloth manufacture during this period, although not all were operational at the same time. Mills downstream generally benefitted from a greater volume of water to power the water wheels, but often had to wait until later in the day for the water to be released by mills further upstream, who had the advantage that their water was available from early morning.

Although the period up to the 1820s was the heyday for the woollen industry, milling had been taking place on the Painswick Stream for much longer, as four mills were recorded when the Domesday Book was compiled in 1086. Cloth was being made in Painswick in 1440, although the earliest known person associated with the industry was Henry Loveday in 1512. Records for 1820 show that there were 25 mills in the parish of Painswick at the time, of which 18 were engaged in making cloth. The industry was hit by recessions in the later 1820s and 1830s, and although steam engines started to appear in the area from the 1810s, only Sheepscombe Mill and Brookhouse Mill are known to have had steam power by 1822. Communication along the Painswick valley was poor, and the recessions, combined with the fact that mills on the River Frome and the Nailsworth Stream had embraced industrialisation, meant that cloth making declined rapidly from the 1840s. Four or five mills were still engaged in cloth manufacture by the 1860s, but many of the small mills had closed, while others had become corn mills, saw mills or pin mills. Peghouse Mill was the only one to retain its links with cloth manufacture into the early 20th century, although three sites were still in use by industry in 1972.

=== Upper river ===
When the Domesday Book was compiled, there were two mills listed on the Brimpsfield estate, both of which were probably in Cranham, where two mills were recorded in 1536. There were three corn mills on the Painswick Stream in Cranham by the early 18th century. Cranham Mill was the furthest upstream, and before it was abandoned around 1900, it was owned by the Walker family in 1750, and then by Thomas Sadler in the 1850s. The building had been converted to a house by 1978. Robert Bliss, a baker from Painswick, owned Sutton Mill in the late 17th century, and a century later it was owned by John Sutton, but it ceased to be used in the 1860s. The mill house dated from the 17th century, with a later mill building which was powered by an overshot water wheel. Several outbuildings were converted to houses in the 20th century. Eddells Mill has a long history, as it is thought to be the mill granted to the monks of Gloucester Abbey in 1121. It was owned by the manor, but was worked as a grist mill in 1650, and was worked by a dyer called John King in 1731. A clothier called Thomas Eddells of Minchinhampton worked it from 1797, and it was no longer under manorial control by 1805, when it was used as a cloth mill. At that time, Benjamin Wood was working it on Eddells' behalf, as Eddells had become bankrupt. It later reverted to grinding corn, before falling out of use in the 1860s. The building was converted to a house in 1926.

Just above Eddells Mill, Painswick Stream is joined by a small brook that flows westwards from Overtown. There was a corn mill near to the house at Haregrove, which was fitted with a new wheel in 1869, after a period of inactivity. William Gardiner was the miller until the early 1890s, after which it was disused. It became ruinous after 1945, and was demolished, although the mill pond is still there. Returning to the main stream, Tocknell's Court was occupied by a clothier called James Tocknell until 1602, when he died. There was a mill nearby, but there is no firm evidence that it was used for fulling. It was used for grinding corn in 1820, when William Cox was the miller. Downstream was Oliver's Mill, at a site which was used for milling from the 15th century. It was sold to a clothier called John Cox in 1785, who worked it together with Damsells Mill until the late 1830s. It was worked again in the 1850s and 1860s, and was well-placed, as the water fell 17 feet (5.2 m) to power the two water wheels. There is no trace of the building left. Damsells Mill was owned by the Gardner family in the 17th century, and was used for dyeing in 1728. It was leased to John Cox in 1812, but the depression in the woollen trade of the 1830s resulted in cloth manufacture ceasing by the end of the decade. From 1854, the building was owned by Charles Gardner, who was a maltster by trade, and it was worked as a grist mill until the end of the century. It was then used as a corn mill in the early 20th century, and later became a house. Although it is not listed, the building is one of the most attractive small mills in Gloucestershire.

Baylis's Upper Mill or Lodge Mill was on the river near to the house called Highgrove, and was a cloth mill from around 1820 until 1856, but was in ruins by the 1890s. A little further downstream was an unnamed mill, powered by water from the Washwell Spring, a small tributary of Painswick Stream. It is known to have been used by Zachariah Powell as a cloth mill between 1820 and 1837, but was then bought by John Loveday, who demolished it. Loveday's Mill was owned by a Mr Loveday in 1777, and in 1792 consisted of a fulling mill, a gig mill and a grist mill. It was worked by a maltster called Thomas Loveday in 1820, and was subsequently used for cloth manufacture, in conjunction with Baylis's Upper Mill. It then became a corn mill in 1853, and continued in use until 1914, after which it became ruinous. The mill house was then extended by the addition of a new two-storey mill and an industrial wing, which had been removed by 1939, when what remained was converted to a house. Brookhouse Mill probably stands on the site of a mill mentioned in 1413. In the 18th century, the Palling family of clothiers were living at Brookhouse, but it is unclear whether they worked the mill. However, it was in use as a cloth mill by 1820, when there was also a dye-house at the site, and a steam engine was acquired in 1822. After a brief spell making umbrella sticks in the 1840s, it had become a corn mill by 1853, and was making hairpins by 1879. The owner was H B Savory, later Savory & Sons, who was employing around 300 people in 1904. The water wheel continued in use until 1962, although there was also a gas engine for times when the water supply was inadequate, and pin manufacture continued until 1972, when 25 people were employed.

Capp or Cap Mill was first mentioned in connection with the Webb family in 1690, and by 1729 it was a cloth mill in the ownership of the Packer family. Although ownership changed, it continued to be used for this purpose until 1841, when Nathaniel Iles Butler became bankrupt. It was bought by Watkins & Okey in the 1850s, who manufactured pins there, and in 1867 a woodturner was using the building. The Webb family also occupied buildings at Painswick Mill in 1634, although there may not have been a mill there at that date. However, there was a mill by 1700, and in 1725 it had two stocks, a gig mill, a dye-house, a furnace, and space for spinning. By 1741 there was a mill, a gig mill and a cider mill. It was used as a cloth mill until the 1860s, with brief periods when it was vacant, after which it was briefly a silk mill, and then a pin mill from 1870 until 1920. W. H. Cole & Co employed over 80 people to manufacture the pins in 1904, and had obtained a steam engine to provide more power. Skinner's Mill, which was at times known as both Painswick and Springs Mill, was probably operational during the 16th and 17th centuries, and was described as two water corn mills in 1698. It appears to have continued as a corn mill, despite being owned by the clothier John Pinfold after 1749, and served this function until 1880. A steam engine was then obtained, and it was used for milling animal feed until the 1920s. There was another small mill called Springs Mill just below it, powered by springs in a small valley, rather than the main river, which was operational between 1802 and 1836. It powered two carding or scribbling machines, and there was a dye-house at the site, but no traces of the mill remain.

=== Below Painswick ===
Kings Mill was operational in 1495, although its purpose at the time is not known. However, by 1671, it was described as a corn mill, tuck mill, gig mill and mosing mill, the latter three terms all related to cloth production. In 1787, it was advertised as separate corn and fulling mills. It was rebuilt in 1818, to accommodate all the processes required to produce cloth, apart from the final weaving. It was briefly used to make scarlet- and billiard-cloth in the later 1850s, and then became a pin mill, owned by Watkins & Okey. It was still water-powered when it was bought out by Savory & Sons of Brookhouse Mill in 1908, who continued to make pins at the site until after the First World War. When production ceased, several of the industrial buildings were demolished. Small's Mill was owned by the Palling family by 1720, and was producing cloth for export to India and the Levant. Despite several changes of ownership, cloth production continued until after 1839. William Clarke & Sons were making umbrella sticks there in 1853, and it was a saw mill from 1857 until the late 1870s. It was then used for making umbrella parts until 1882, and was owned by a timber merchant between 1885 and 1910. By the 1960s only two storeys remained, in a poor state, but subsequently, the water wheel has been restored, and a house has been built on the site of the mill. Pitchcombe Upper Mill was located on Pitchcombe Stream, a small tributary that flows through the village of Pitchcombe. It had a water wheel that was 20 feet (6.1 m) in diameter, and was repeatedly offered for sale as a clothing mill between 1814 and the 1830s. It was working as a corn mill by 1838, and although it was briefly used for the manufacture of hooks and eyes around 1850, it soon reverted to being a corn mill. It was then owned by a company of builders and carpenters from 1870 until 1927, after which it was converted to a dwelling.

Pitchcombe Mill was to the east of the village on the Painswick Stream. In 1771 it was a grist mill with three pairs of stones, but seems to have become a cloth mill around 1796. A report to the factory inspector by William Fluck, the tenant from 1828, stated that water power provided 16 hp (12 kW) in winter and around half of that amount during the summer. By 1838 there were three power looms and 33 operational hand looms at the site, with two unused hand looms. It was still being used for cloth production by William Freeman in 1849, although Ebenezer Durdin was also listed there in 1842, making umbrella and parasol sticks. Durdin was also a manufacturing chemist. The site became a corn mill in the late 19th century, and continued to be so until the 1930s, after which it was demolished. Rock Mill was used for cloth manufacture by various owners between 1681 and the 1850s. Water power was supplemented by a 12 hp (8.9 kW) steam engine in the 1840s, and it had become a pin mill by the mid-1850s. It was then used for grinding dyewood, and the site was producing flock in 1889, after which it was used to grind corn. In 1903 it was still shown as a logwood mill by the Ordnance Survey, and the Rock Brewery was also located at the site. The mill buildings had been demolished by 1923.

Grove Mill was a cloth or fulling mill in 1763, but had previously been an oil mill. By 1820 it had become a paper mill, but was producing grist by 1827. It was then a flour mill until sometime after the First World War, when it was demolished. The site of Salmon's Mill is known to have been in use for milling by 1439, although there is no record of what was being milled. It was used as a cloth mill from 1593 until 1799, and was then owned by a series of corn millers until at least 1884. The mill was powered by two wheels, one of 14 feet (4.3 m) diameter, and the second of 13 feet (4.0 m) diameter. The site was known as Salmon Springs by 1884, and was the home of Salmon Springs Brewery by 1885, a use which continued through the 1920s, but the buildings were disused by 1936. The final mill on the river was Stratford Mill, which was a fulling mill in 1597. It became a corn mill in 1801, although it was advertised as partly converted for the manufacture of clothing in 1807. It was definitely grinding corn in 1842, when there were two overshot water wheels of 14 feet (4.3 m) diameter, and three steam engines with a combined power of 50 hp (37 kW). The site contained 13 pairs of French mill stones, and was still in use as a corn mill in 1936. It was later destroyed in a fire, and the site is now occupied by a Tesco supermarket.

When the Stroudwater Navigation was restored, provision had to be made for the combined flood flow of the Painswick Stream and Slad Brook to bypass Dudbridge Locks, since both had been diverted into the canal bed during the 1950s. Because of the volume of water involved, a hydro-electric scheme was incorporated into the design. The turbine is fed by a 3-foot (900 mm) diameter pipe, which leaves the canal above Dudbridge Upper or Foundry Lock. After passing through the turbine, which is located beside Dudbridge Lower Lock, it discharges back into the canal below the lock. It can generate up to 22 kW of electricity, the sale of which helps to maintain the canal.

== Water quality ==
The Environment Agency measure the water quality of the river systems in England. Each is given an overall ecological status, which may be one of five levels: high, good, moderate, poor or bad. There are several components that are used to determine this, including biological status, which looks at the quantity and varieties of invertebrates, angiosperms and fish. Chemical status compares the concentrations of various chemicals against known safe concentrations and is rated good or fail.

The water quality of the Painswick Stream was as follows in 2019.

Section	Ecological Status	Chemical Status	Length	Catchment	Channel
Painswick Stream - source to confluence Stroudwater	Good	Fail	6.0 miles (9.7 km)	12.02 square miles (31.1 km^{2})	
Stroudwater Navigation (Dudbridge east)	Good	Fail	2.6 miles (4.2 km)		artificial

The ecological assessment of the river is rated as good quality, an improvement from its moderate status in 2016. It has achieved good quality despite a number of factors which affect fish populations, not least the number of weirs built to enable milling to take place. Like many rivers in the UK, the chemical status changed from good to fail in 2019, due to the presence of polybrominated diphenyl ethers (PBDE) and mercury compounds, neither of which had previously been included in the assessment.

== Bibliography ==
- Baggs, A P; Jurica, A R J; Sheils, W J (1976). "Painswick: Economic history: Mills and the cloth industry". A History of the County of Gloucester: Volume 11, Bisley and Longtree Hundreds. Victoria County History. British History Online.
- Hadfield, Charles (1969). The Canals of South and South East England. David and Charles. ISBN 978-0-7153-4693-8.
- Herbert, N H, ed. (1981). A History of the County of Gloucester. Vol. 7. Oxford University Press – via Victoria County History (British History Online).
- Tann, Jennifer (2012). Wool and Water. History Press. ISBN 978-0-7524-6215-8.
