= Stroudwater Navigation =

Canal in Gloucestershire, England

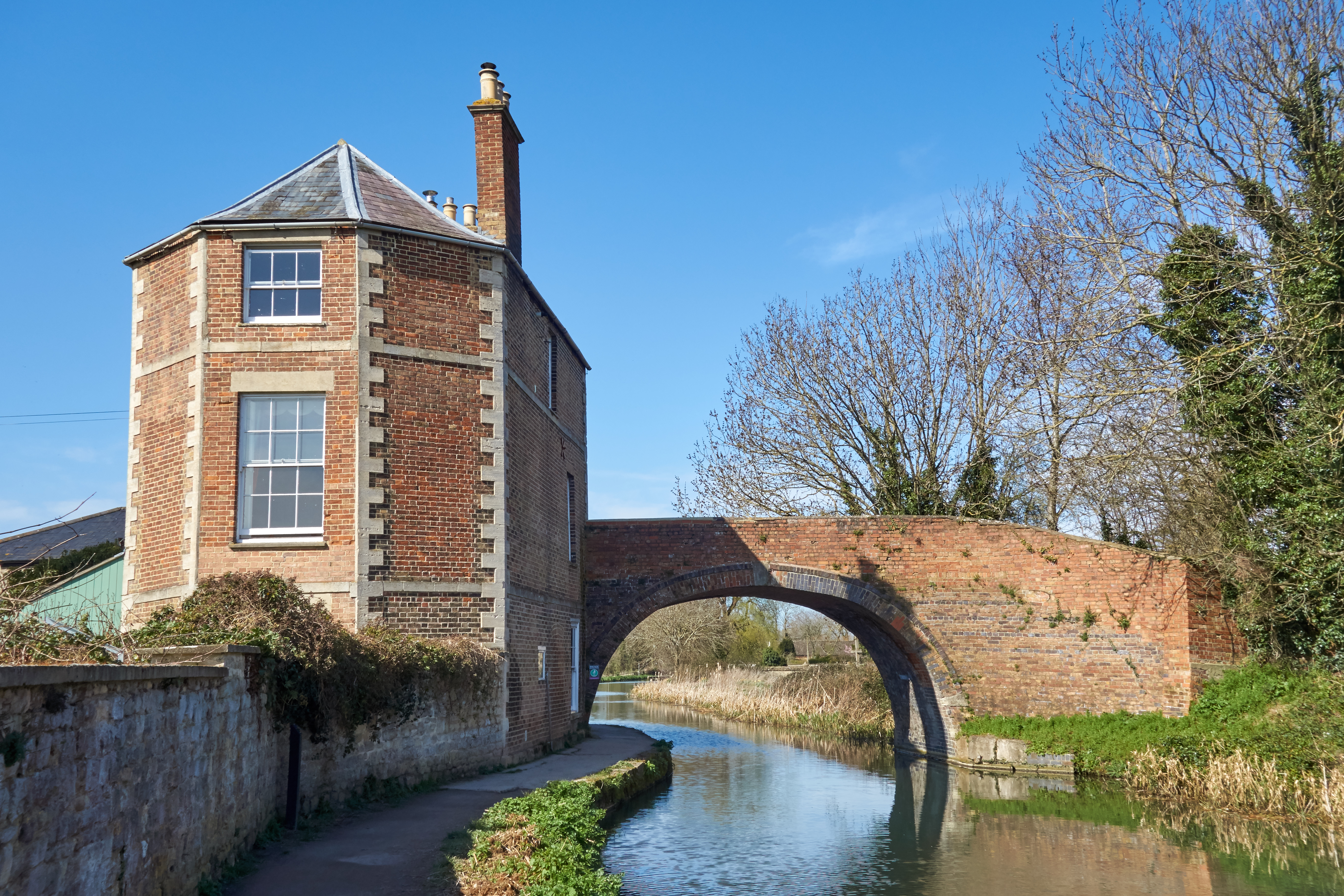
- Nutshell Bridge on the Stroudwater Navigation

Specifications
- Maximum boat length: 70 ft 0 in (21.34 m)
- Maximum boat beam: 15 ft 6 in (4.72 m)
- Locks: 12 + 1 Stop lock (originally 13 + Stop lock)
- Status: Active restoration project
- Navigation authority: Stroud Valleys Canal Company

History
- Original owner: Company of Proprietors of the Stroudwater Navigation
- Principal engineer: John Priddy, Edmund Lingard
- Date of act: 1730, 1776
- Date completed: 1779
- Date closed: 1954
- Date restored: 2018 (Phase 1A), 2028 (Phase 1B, expected)

Geography
- Start point: Wallbridge, near Stroud
- End point: Framilode, River Severn
- Connects to: River Severn (formerly), Gloucester and Sharpness Canal, Thames and Severn Canal

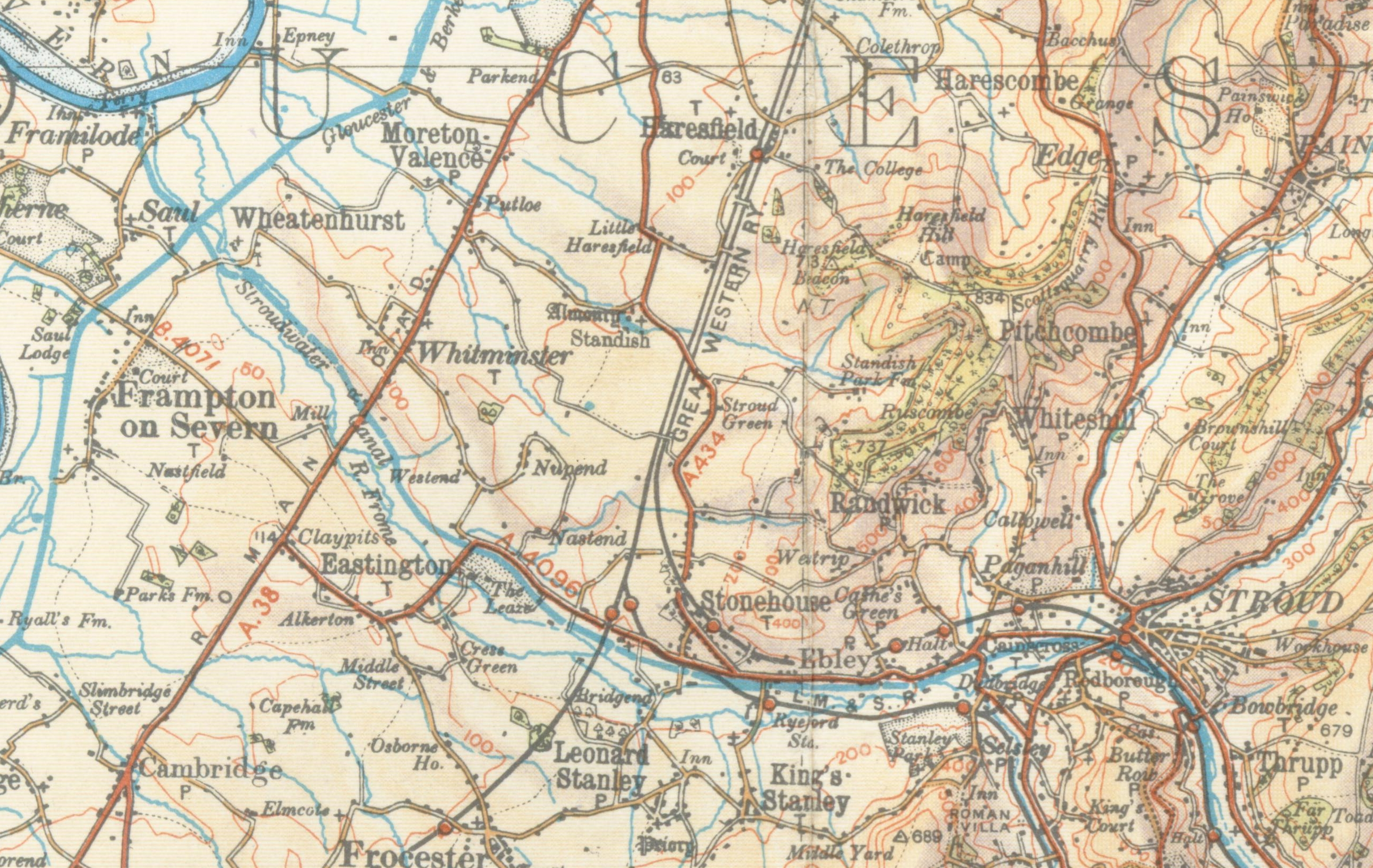
Map of the Stroudwater Navigation, 1933

The Stroudwater Navigation is a canal in Gloucestershire, England which linked Stroud to the River Severn. It was authorised in 1776, although part had already been built, as the proprietors believed that an act of Parliament obtained in 1730 gave them the necessary powers. Opened in 1779, it was a commercial success, its main cargo being coal. It was 8 miles (13 km) in length and had a rise of 102 ft 5 in (31.22 m) through 12 locks. Following the opening of the Thames and Severn Canal in 1789, it formed part of a through route from Bristol to London, although much of its trade vanished when the Kennet and Avon Canal provided a more direct route in 1810. Despite competition from the railways, the canal continued to pay dividends to shareholders until 1922, and was not finally abandoned until 1954.

Even before its closure, there was interest in retaining the canal for its amenity value. The Stroudwater Canal Society, which later became the Cotswold Canals Trust, was formed in 1972. Following initial hostility from the proprietors, who had not been stripped of their powers when the canal had closed, agreement was reached and work began on restoration of the waterway. The project gained popularity, and in 2003, a bid was made to the Heritage Lottery Fund for £82 million to restore both the Stroudwater Navigation and the Thames and Severn Canal. The project had to be split into smaller parts, and only the first phase has so far been funded in this way, when a grant of £11.9 million was confirmed in 2006. With match funding, this enabled the section from 'The Ocean' at Stonehouse to Wallbridge to be reopened, together with the Wallbridge to Hope Mill section of the Thames and Severn.

A second bid to the Heritage Lottery Fund for the connection from Stonehouse to the Gloucester and Sharpness Canal at Saul was rejected in 2007. This section presented some engineering challenges, as it was severed by the construction of the M5 motorway and the A38 road. The roundabout where the A38 joins the A419 road was built over Bristol Road Lock, and part of the route was destroyed by flood relief work for the River Frome, while at Stonehouse, the bridge carrying the Bristol and Gloucester Railway had been replaced by a culvert. A bid to the newly formed Gloucestershire Local Transport Board for its reinstatement, and to create a long-distance footpath along the route was rejected, but in 2019 the Heritage Lottery Fund made a further grant of £8.9 million towards the section from Ocean to Saul. Highways England also made a grant of £4 million, to fund the construction of the canal under the A38 roundabout, and it is expected that the Stroud section will be linked to the national waterways network at Saul Junction by 2028. Outside the main restoration, the Cotswold Canals Trust is gradually restoring many of the other structures, with the ultimate goal of re-opening a link between the River Thames and the River Severn.

== History ==
=== Construction ===
Stroudwater Navigation Act 1729
- Act of Parliament
- Parliament of Great Britain
- Long title: An Act for making navigable the River Stroudwater, in the County of Gloucester, from the River Severn, at or near Framiload, to Wallbridge, near the Town of Stroud, in the same County.
- Citation: 3 Geo. 2. c. 13
- Territorial extent: Great Britain

Dates
- Royal assent: 15 May 1730
- Commencement: 13 January 1730 (Note: Start of session.)
Other legislation
Amended by	Stroudwater Navigation Act 1758; Stroudwater Navigation Act 1776
Relates to	Stroudwater Navigation Act 1954

Status: Amended

Text of statute as originally enacted

The first plans for making the small River Frome navigable date back to the last three years of the 17th century. The plan was to serve the woollen industry, by carrying coal from the Severn to Stroud and transporting the finished cloth away to markets, but it was opposed by mill owners, and it came to nothing. The idea was revived in 1728, when John Hore, who had previously succeeded in making the River Kennet navigable, suggested a canal around 8.2 miles (13.2 km) long, with 12 locks, suitable for 60-ton barges. An act of Parliament, the Stroudwater Navigation Act 1729 (3 Geo. 2. c. 13), was obtained in 1730, with support from those who worked in the cloth industry, but opposition from some of the millers, but it seemed to ignore Hore's recommendations, in that it was again based on making the river navigable. As the millers were given powers that would have effectively shut the navigation for two months each year, and the tolls were set at a level that would have discouraged traffic, no further action was taken.

Stroudwater Navigation Act 1758
- Act of Parliament
- Parliament of Great Britain
- Long title: An Act to amend and explain an Act made in the Third Year of His present Majesty's Reign, intituled, "An Act for making navigable the River Stroudwater, in the County of Gloucester, from the River Severn, at or near Famiload, to Wallbridge near the Town of Stroud in the same County."
- Citation: 32 Geo. 2. c. 47
- Territorial extent: Great Britain

Dates
- Royal assent: 5 April 1759
- Commencement: 23 November 1758
Other legislation
Amends	Stroudwater Navigation Act 1729
Amended by	Stroudwater Navigation Act 1954

Status: Amended

Text of statute as originally enacted

John Dallaway, who had been appointed as a commissioner under the Stroudwater Navigation Act 1729, commissioned the engineer Thomas Yeoman to make a new survey in 1754, and his new plan was published the following year. It was for a navigation from Wallbridge to the Severn, estimated to cost £8,145, which would require 16 locks and four stanks (which were probably half-locks or staunches). In order to placate the millers, water for the operation of the locks would be provided by a reservoir below Wallbridge, which would cover 2 acres (0.8 ha) and be filled on Sundays, when the mills were inactive and would not be needing the water. Tolls were set at a more realistic level. While support and finance for the scheme were being gained, John Kemmett, Arthur Wynde, James Pynock and Thomas Bridge devised a scheme which used cranes at each mill weir to transfer cargo, stored in boxes, from a boat on one level to another on the other side of the weir. The Stroudwater Navigation Act 1758 (32 Geo. 2. c. 47) authorised Kemmett and the others to construct the canal without any locks to avoid loss of water to the mills. The act allowed two years for completion of the scheme, and although some progress had been made by April 1761, Kemmett was given an extension of six years at that time. After about 5 miles (8 km) of river had been improved, the works were abandoned as being too costly.

Stroudwater Navigation Act 1776
- Act of Parliament
- Parliament of Great Britain
- Long title: An Act to amend an Act, passed in the Third Year of His late Majesty's Reign, intituled, "An Act for making navigable the River Stroudwater, in the County of Gloucester, from the River Severn, at or near Framiload to Wallbridge, near the Town of Stroud, in the same County;" and for giving other Powers for the Purpose of making a Navigation from Framiload to Wallbridge aforesaid.
- Citation: 16 Geo. 3. c. 21
- Territorial extent: Great Britain

Dates
- Royal assent: 22 March 1776
- Commencement: 31 October 1776
Other legislation
Amends	Stroudwater Navigation Act 1729
Relates to	Stroudwater Navigation Act 1954

Status: Current legislation

Text of statute as originally enacted

By 1774, canal building was much better understood, and a new attempt was made. The plan was led by Dallaway's son William, who asked Thomas Dadford Jr. (the engineer on the Staffordshire and Worcestershire Canal) and John Priddy (who had been the engineer on the Droitwich Canal during its construction) to carry out a survey. The cost of a canal which avoided the river and hence the mills, was put at £16,750, and soon £20,000 had been raised. Deciding that they did not need a new act of Parliament, since the powers of the Stroudwater Navigation Act 1729 were still valid, Yeoman, who had carried out the 1754 survey, was asked to survey the route again, and a route was selected, which would require 12 locks. Work started, with Samuel Jones as engineer, but he was replaced by Priddy within a month. A challenge to the legality of building a canal under the Stroudwater Navigation Act 1729 was mounted by landowners and millers in 1775. An injunction was obtained, and the Gloucestershire Assizes ruled that the act did not cover the work. The Stroudwater Navigation Act 1776 (16 Geo. 3. c. 21) was obtained on 25 March 1776 to remedy the situation, authorising the raising of £20,000 and an extra £10,000 if required. Both sides commissioned the writing of poems to support their causes.

Work resumed under the supervision of Priddy, but he was soon replaced by Edmund Lingard, who had been the engineer for the Coventry Canal. The canal was opened in stages as it was completed. It reached Chippenham Platt at the end of 1777, Ryeford in January 1779, and it was open throughout to the Wallbridge terminus on 21 July 1779. It had cost £40,930, which had been raised by calling £150 on each £100 share, by borrowing money from the shareholders, by running up debts, and by using the tolls from the parts of the canal which were already open. Traffic was around 16,000 tons per year, which enabled the company to repay the debts and to declare a first dividend of five per cent in 1786.

=== Operation ===
The locks were suitably sized for Severn Trows, which were 72 by 15.5 feet (21.9 by 4.7 m), and could carry 60 tons. The canal was not provided with a towing path for horses. Some boats sailed along the canal, but most were bow-hauled by men. Framilode Lock at the entrance to the canal was a tide lock, with multiple gates to cope with all states of the tide. When a vessel arrived at the junction, a rope would be taken from it to the shore, and attached to a capstan, which would then be used to haul the boat into the lock. Once the canal was open, the proprietors worked hard to improve the facilities, and a number of warehouses were built. Many of the shareholders were also involved with the Thames and Severn Canal scheme, which was completed in 1789 and provided a through route between Wallbridge and the River Thames at Lechlade. The navigation was seen as a commercial waterway; pleasure boats were discouraged by the imposition of a charge of £1 (in 2020: £112.00) for the use of each lock.

The main cargo carried was coal. In 1788, a group of shareholders set up a coal committee, and began trading. At first, the product came from the Staffordshire coalfields, travelling via the Staffordshire and Worcestershire Canal, or from the Shropshire coalfields, but this was later supplemented by coal from the south Gloucestershire mines and then the Forest of Dean. This profitable business continued until 1833. Boats that worked the canal included Severn Trows, a type of sailing boat which was fitted with ketch, cutter or sloop rigging. Many were later converted for use as dumb barges by removing the masts, but none are known to have survived to the present day.

In 1794, a basin was built above Framilode Lock, so that vessels could wait there until the tide in the Severn was at a suitable level. This had been requested by the Thames and Severn Canal company, but requests for a horse towing path in 1799 and 1812 were dismissed as too expensive. They eventually provided one after the Gloucester and Berkeley Canal had been built, and the canal was the only part of the waterway from Shrewsbury on the Severn to Teddington on the Thames that did not have one. It was completed in August 1827. The opening of the Gloucester and Berkeley Canal in 1825 required a slight diversion where they crossed at Saul, and the levels were adjusted by building a new lock on the Stroudwater below the junction, to ensure neither company lost water to the other; the new company paid for its construction. After the Gloucester and Berkeley Canal opened to Sharpness in 1827, the link between Saul and the Severn at Framilode was used much less, although coal from the Forest of Dean still used that route.

Traffic, receipts and dividends steadily increased. Tolls rose from £1,468 in 1779 to £6,807 in 1821. The first dividend of 3.75 per cent was paid in 1786, and had reached 15.78 per cent by 1821. Figures for tonnage are not available for the early years, but were 79,359 tons in 1821. There was a dip in the carriage of merchandise in 1810, when the Kennet and Avon Canal opened and provided a more convenient route from Bristol to London, but it picked up again after 1819, when the North Wilts Canal opened, providing a link from Latton near Cricklade to Abingdon via Swindon and the Wilts and Berks Canal, which was easier than using the Thames. The highest dividend paid was in 1833, when shareholders received 26.33 per cent, after which receipts and dividends steadily dropped. In 1859, in order to allow the passage of a coal barge called the Queen Esther, two of the locks were widened.

=== Decline ===
Stroudwater Navigation Act 1954
- Act of Parliament
- Parliament of the United Kingdom
- Long title: An Act to authorise the closing for navigation of the Stroudwater Navigation; to provide for the transfer of part of the Navigation to the British Transport Commission; to amend the Acts relating to the Company of Proprietors of the Stroudwater Navigation; and for other purposes.
- Citation: 2 & 3 Eliz. 2. c. l
- Territorial extent: United Kingdom

Dates
- Royal assent: 30 July 1954
- Commencement: 30 July 1954 (Note: The Acts of Parliament (Commencement) Act 1793.)
Other legislation
Amends	Stroudwater Navigation Act 1758
Relates to	Stroudwater Navigation Act 1729; Stroudwater Navigation Act 1776

Status: Current legislation

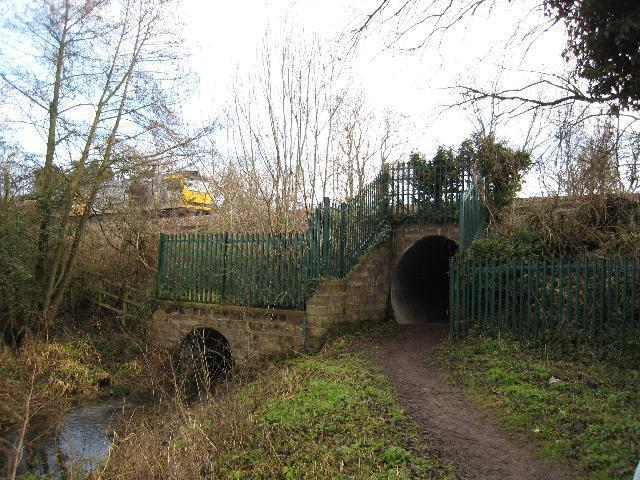
The bridge under the Bristol to Gloucester railway line at Ocean was replaced by a culvert in the 1960s.

The first threat from a railway came in 1825, when there was a proposal for a line from Framilode Passage to Brimscombe Port. The canal tolls were reduced as a bargaining tool, but the promoters went ahead with their bill. The Stroudwater Company opposed it and it was defeated in Parliament. The Great Western Railway opened a line from Swindon to Gloucester in 1845, which passed through Stroud, but the effects on the canal were rather less than the effects on the Thames and Severn. However, the Stonehouse and Nailsworth Railway Act 1863 (26 & 27 Vict. c. cxxxii) was passed, allowing the construction of a railway from Stonehouse to Dudbridge and Nailsworth that directly competed with the canal. Dividends fell below 5 per cent after 1880, although they did not cease entirely until 1922. Around the same time the connection to the Severn at Framilode became blocked, leaving the connection to the Gloucester and Sharpness Canal as the only link between the canal and the River Severn. The last toll was paid in 1941, and most of the canal was formally abandoned under the terms of the Stroudwater Navigation Act 1954 (2 & 3 Eliz. 2. c. l). Although this removed the need to maintain the waterway for navigation, the Company of Proprietors was not disbanded, and retained most of its other powers. It consists of those who now own the original shares, although over half of the shares were transferred to a Trust in the 1950s, which prevents hostile takeovers and ensures that the company will always be run for the benefit of the communities through which the canal passes. After the closure of the canal, the canal company continued to generate income for many years through the sale of water and some monies produced by property holdings.

In the early 1970s, the weirs at Whitminster were modified, so that much of the water flowing down the River Frome could be diverted into the remains of the navigation, below Whitminster Lock, and from there into the Gloucester and Sharpness Canal. This water is abstracted from the canal near Sharpness, and treated by Bristol Water's Purton Treatment Works. Work on the Purton site began on 24 August 1970, and the works commenced operation in April 1973, providing a new water supply for Bristol.

== Restoration ==
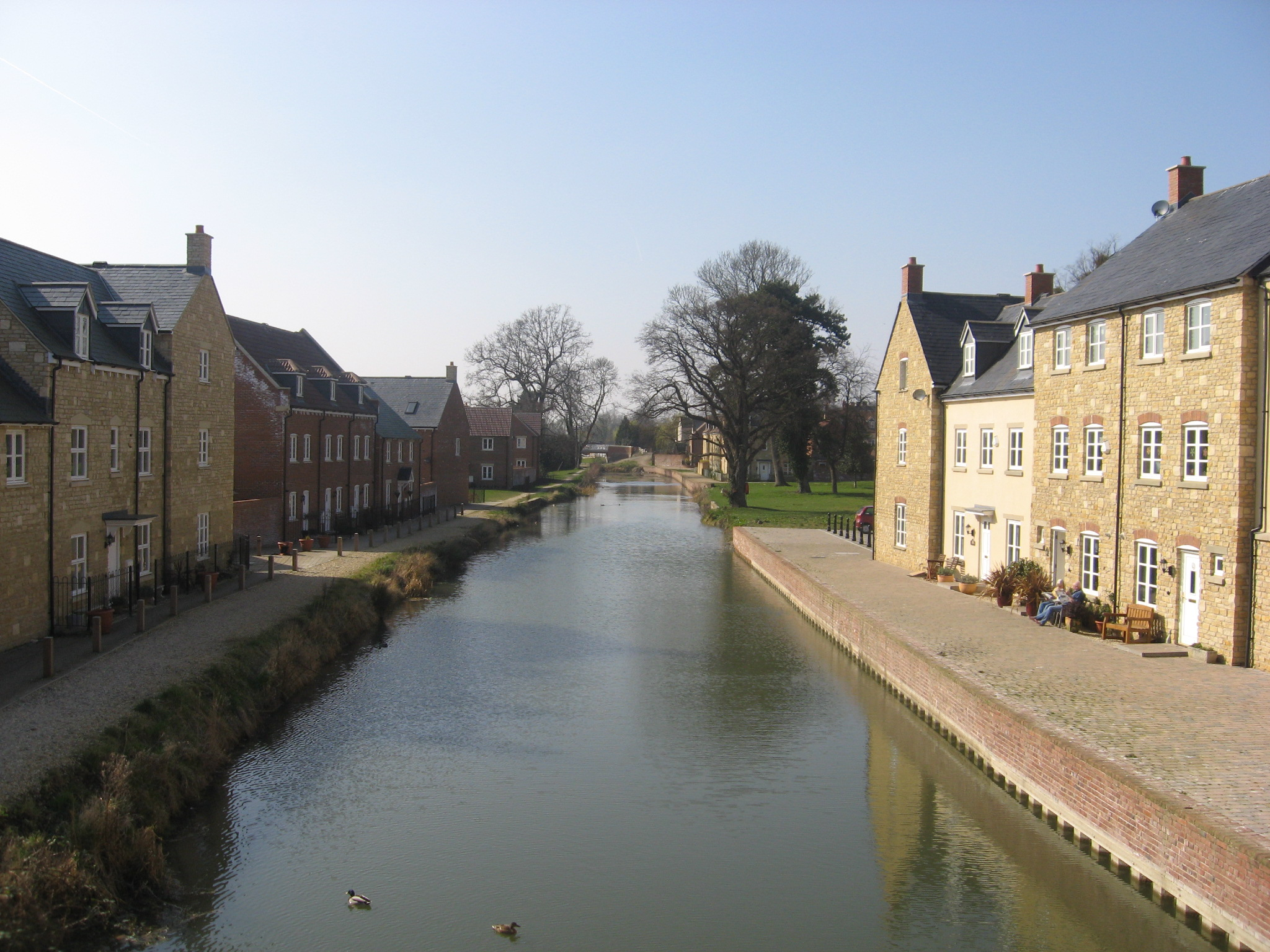
The restored canal to the west of Ebley Mill is flanked by a new housing development.

Interest in maintaining the canal for its amenity value began before the canal closed, with the Inland Waterways Association mounting a campaign to retain it when plans to close it were first announced in 1952. They were already formulating plans for the revival of the Thames and Severn Canal, which depended on the Stroudwater for its link to the River Severn. The National Parks Commission declared that it should be retained for its amenity value and beauty in 1954, but it was closed nevertheless.

The publication in 1972 of Lost Canals of England and Wales, a book by Ronald Russell, resulted in a number of canal restoration societies being formed, as it gave details of 78 derelict canals, and suggested that the Stroudwater and Thames and Severn Canals should be restored. In 1974 the BBC featured an interview with a local resident, Michael Ayland, who proposed restoration of the waterway, and a chance discussion by him with a reporter for the Bristol Evening Post resulted in the newspaper carrying an article headlined "Exclusive: canal to be reopened to Stroud." Offers to help flooded in, and an initial public meeting had to be moved from the Stroud Subscription Rooms to the Ballroom, after it appeared that the expected attendance of 20 people might be exceeded. Some 300 people met in the Ballroom, and the Stroudwater Canal Society was formed. This was renamed the Stroudwater, Thames and Severn Canal Trust in April 1975 as the scope of the project expanded, and became the Cotswold Canals Trust in July 1990. Although the Proprietors were initially hostile to the Trust, this gradually changed, and in 1979 granted them permission to start work on the section from Pike Bridge at Eastington to Ryeford, so that a trip-boat could be used on it. As attitudes softened, the Proprietors re-purchased sections of the waterway which had previously been sold off.

=== Funding ===
In 2001, the Cotswold Canals Partnership was established, drawing together people representing the Proprietors, the Cotswold Canals Trust, councils at district and county level, and a number of other interested parties. This provided a suitable structure to drive the restoration forwards. In 2002, the waterway was identified as being of high priority in the Association of Inland Navigation Authorities report entitled Vision for Strategic Enhancement of Britain's Inland Navigation Network, and was one of several new projects highlighted at British Waterways' Unlocked and Unlimited conference held in March. The estimated cost of the project to restore both the Stroudwater Navigation and the Thames and Severn Canal was £82 million.

Having raised £100,000, the Cotswold Canals Trust lodged the money with the Waterways Trust, in the hope that it could be used as match funding for any grants that might be received. Andy Stumpf became the full-time Regeneration Programme Manager, working on a major bid application to the Heritage Lottery Fund (HLF) to finance the restoration, and the canal was visited by Charles, Prince of Wales, in his capacity as Patron of the Waterways Trust. A Heritage Survey, which cost £60,000 and was funded by the Inland Waterways Association, was carried out, as was a Community Development Plan and a Visitor Management Strategy, costing another £30,000, all of which were pre-requisites for the main HLF bid. By the time the bid was ready for submission, the HLF were under pressure for the funds they had, and asked British Waterways, who were heading up the application, to break the bid and the project into smaller phases. At the end of 2003, a provisional grant of £11.3 million was awarded by the HLF, to enable the restoration of the Stroudwater Navigation between Stonehouse and Wallbridge, and the Thames and Severn Canal between Wallbridge and Brimscombe Port. An additional £2.9 million was received from the European Inter-Regional budget for this first phase. By the time the grant was awarded in January 2006, it had risen to £11.9 million, and a further £6 million of match funding was received from the South West of England Regional Development Agency.

As part of the process, the Proprietors leased the canal to British Waterways in 2005. However, British Waterways had to withdraw from the scheme in 2008, due to financial difficulties, and the role of project leader was taken over by Stroud District Council. Following the reorganisation, the Stroud Valleys Canal Company was established in March 2009. It is a limited company, with two independent directors and three directors representing Stroud District Council, the Proprietors, and the Cotswold Canals Trust. Its purpose is to hold the assets for the canals, and its charitable status means that stamp duty land tax does not have to be paid. The company will be responsible for management and maintenance of the canal once it is re-opened. In 2013, the Department for Transport was in the process of reorganising how funding for major transport schemes was managed, and this enabled Stroud District Council to submit a bid for £1.5 million to the newly formed Gloucestershire Local Transport Board to fund the replacement of the Ocean railway culvert with a bridge. A second application for £650,000 was made to enable part of the Thames and Severn Way long-distance footpath to be created, specifically, the section from Saul Junction to Chalford. The bids were not successful, however.

The effort to reconnect the restored section to the national network at Saul Junction was branded as Stroudwater Navigation Connected, and another bid was put before the Heritage Lottery Fund. This was partially successful, when £842,800 was awarded to finance the development phase of the project. This paid for surveys, so that the future impact of the project could be measured, for detailed planning and investigative work, and for gaining approval for the project from the Environment Agency and Natural England. Providing that this work demonstrated that the project was achievable and that its costings were realistic, a further £9 million would be released in early 2020.

=== Development ===
The length to be restored in the first phase, known as Phase 1a, was around 6 miles (9.7 km), and presented some of the biggest difficulties to restoration in the whole 36-mile (58 km) route. Through Dudbridge, the channel had been used as part of a flood relief scheme by the Environment Agency. Water from Slad Brook, which is culverted beneath Stroud, joins the Thames and Severn Canal a short distance above Lower Wallbridge Lock, the first on that canal, while Painswick Stream joins above the Dudbridge Locks, and Ruscombe Brook joins between the two locks. The top gates of the locks had been replaced with concrete dams, which maintained the water level at normal flows around 3.3 feet (1.0 m) lower than the navigable levels. Below the A419 Dudbridge Road Bridge, the water was discharged into the River Frome. As a consequence of its flood relief function, the channel here is classified as a "main river". Designs for reinstatement of the canal had to accommodate large flows on this section, and included underground bywash culverts, capable of carrying the full flood flow of all three streams. A new weir which carries a towpath bridge was constructed where the water leaves the canal to enter the River Frome, and a set of floodgates was constructed beyond the weir, to protect the canal from high water levels.

In November 2007 work started to clear the canal between Ryeford Double Lock and Oil Mills Bridge. Oil Mills Bridge was rebuilt, with the brickwork left after its demolition being incorporated into the new bridge. By mid-2012, when the Inland Waterways Association held a trailboat festival on the refurbished canal as part of an event called "Stroud on Water", over 2 miles (3.2 km) of canal from Ocean swingbridge to the bottom of Dudbridge Locks were open for navigation, as was a second section from the top of the locks to the bottom of Wallbridge Locks on the Thames and Severn Canal.

As part of the restoration of the Dudbridge Locks, a hydro-electric installation was built, partly funded by grants of £100,000 from the Gloucestershire Environmental Trust and £45,000 from the Summerfield Charitable Trust. Between 2014 and 2022 the scheme generated around 80 MWh per year, and income from the sale of electricity to help fund ongoing maintenance of the canal was £20,000 per year.

An evaluation cruise was held on 10 November 2017, when the maintenance boat Wookey Hole carried three assessors from the Heritage Lottery Fund, the chief executive from Stroud District Council and their canal project manager, the Mayor of Stroud, and the Cotswold Canals Trust chief executive and vice-chair. It travelled from The Ocean at Stonehouse eastwards to Bowbridge Lock, with a stop for lunch at Upper Wallbridge Lock. The cruise enabled the assessors to view the work done and to sign off the Phase 1a project, bringing it to a conclusion.

=== Cotswold Canals Connected ===
The second phase of the restoration project, initially known as Phase 1b, was for the section from Stonehouse to the Gloucester and Sharpness Canal at Saul Junction, which had been blocked by the M5 motorway and the A38 road. A bid for £16 million was submitted to the Living Landmarks Fund (part of the Big Lottery Fund) in August 2006. An interim award of £250,000 was made to allow the bid to be developed, but the application was rejected in November 2007. Despite this setback, money for purchasing the land around the M5 and the A38 was part of the phase 1 grant by the HLF. Proposals for the A38 involved tunnelling under the Whitminster roundabout; the Bristol Road Lock was buried by the construction of the roundabout, and a new lock would be constructed to the east of it. There were two proposals for passing under the M5 motorway: one was for a new channel alongside the River Frome through an existing culvert, and the other was for a new wider culvert, nearer to the original line of the canal. Below this, the canal used to cross the Frome at Lockham Aqueduct but this was demolished in the 1970s, when the canal and river channel were combined as part of a flood defence scheme.

Bids for Heritage Lottery funding were rejected in May 2012 and November 2015. A revised bid was submitted in November 2017, and following criticism of the lack of investment by partners in the project, was backed by a promise of £3 million from Stroud District Council, £700,000 from Gloucestershire County Council and £675,000 from the Canal & River Trust, who also pledged practical support. In addition, the Cotswold Canals Trust offered financial assistance and volunteer labour. They contribute around 15,000 hours of labour per year, and started work on channel clearance and investigative surveys on the Phase 1b section at the beginning of 2017, in advance of any funding package being available. The restoration of the section from Stonehouse to Stroud had, by 2017, attracted some £117 million of private investment into the canal corridor since work started in 2006. Additionally, a further £3 million was to be invested in infrastructure improvements at Brimscombe Port, the original terminus for the Phase 1a project, by Stroud District Council and the Homes and Communities Agency.

In early 2016, work began on a £210,000 project to restore Junction Lock on the Old Stroudwater at Saul, after a grant of £75,000 was received from the Heritage Lottery Fund. The lock was not made navigable, as the original canal route to the river at Framilode is infilled beyond the bottom gates and not needed since the opening of the Gloucester and Sharpness Canal, but new lock gates were fitted, interpretation signs erected, and access was improved. The structure was on the English Heritage "Buildings at Risk" register prior to work starting.

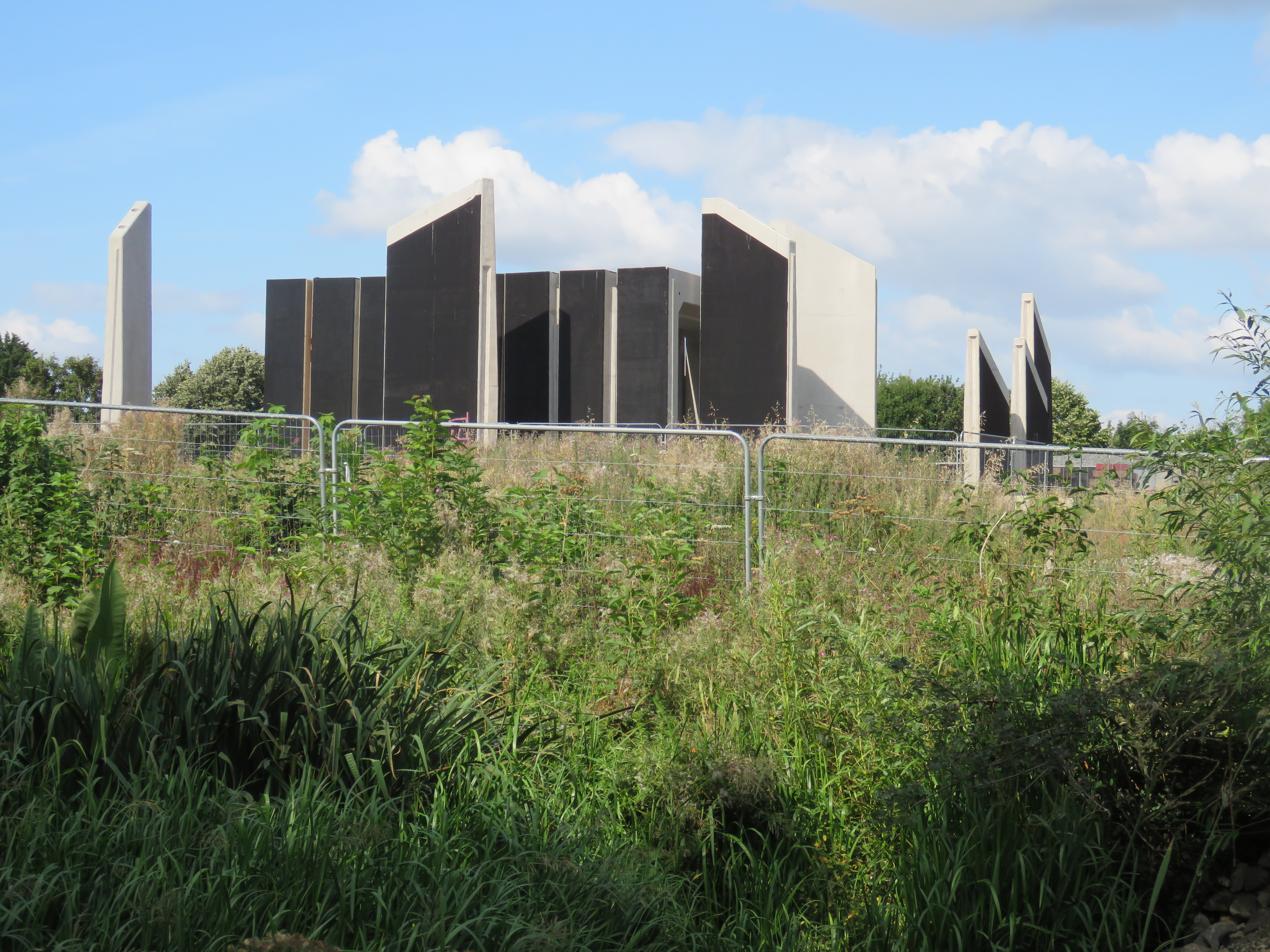
Pre-cast bridge components awaiting installation at Stonehouse

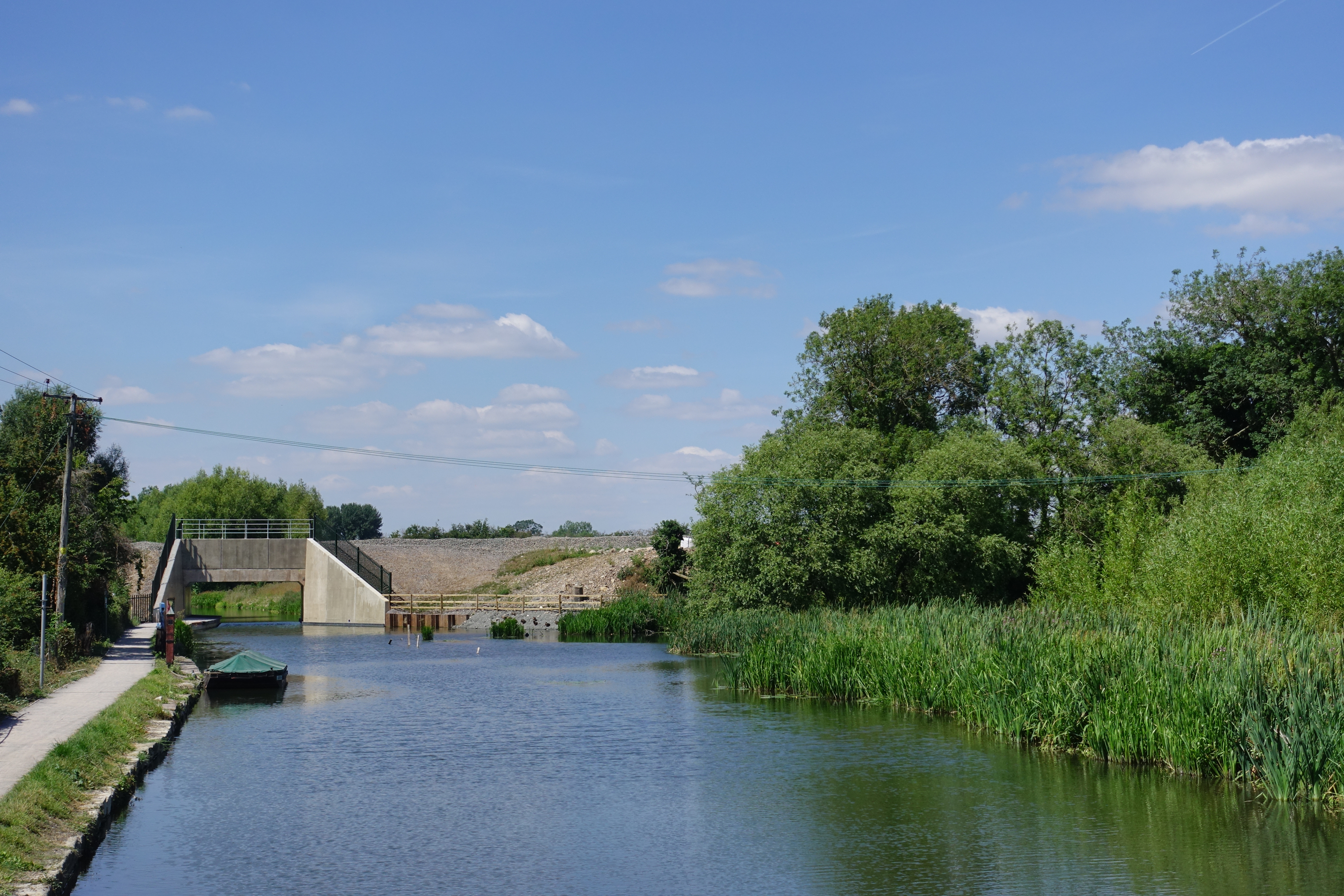
The Ocean, August 2022, with newly completed railway bridge

By 2018, Phase 1b had been renamed the Cotswold Canals Connected project, as it would connect the isolated section restored under Phase 1a to the national network at Saul Junction. The Cotswold Canals Trust were given an award of £872,000 in 2018 by the Heritage Lottery Fund to enable them to plan the project, which it was estimated would cost some £23.4 million. The Heritage Lottery Fund were prepared to provide a large part of this, but the award depended on the Trust raising an additional £1 million to cover a gap in the total funding package. The project included reinstatement of the missing mile of canal destroyed by the building of the M5 motorway and the A38 roundabout, which buried Bristol Road Lock. In an unexpected turn of events, Highways England agreed to partially fund this part of the work, which would involve two tunnels, a substantial cutting, and two new locks. Their contribution of £4 million enabled work such as tunnelling, which cannot be done by volunteers, to be brought forward, speeding up the whole project. The money came from their Designated Funds programme, designed to leave a positive legacy for future generations, and would fund some 90 acres (36 ha) of wildlife habitats to increase bio-diversity, improvements to flood protection in the area, and routes for cycling and walking, in addition to the reinstatement of the canal channel. Progress was rapid, and by late 2020 the channel beneath the roundabout had been constructed and filled with water, with the final stages of reinstating the roundabout well underway. At the Institution of Civil Engineers South West Awards Ceremony 2021, the work was awarded the prize for the best new build project costing under £8 million, and also picked up the People's Choice Award, after an on-line vote.

The next major project was for Network Rail to create a passage through the railway embankment at Ocean. With an £8.9 million grant from the Heritage Lottery Fund and funding from other sources, this was initially expected to be carried out during the May bank holiday weekend in 2021. By early 2021, a large compound had been established close to the railway, where concrete components for the underbridge were being cast. However, investigations into the geology of the site revealed that the bridge would require deeper foundations than planned, and its installation was put back to the period between Christmas 2021 and New Year. Work began on 24 December 2021 after 250 yards (230 m) of the canal had been drained and fish moved to another part of the canal. Using the largest mobile crane available in Britain, to ensure that the operation was unlikely to be interrupted by high winds, the eight concrete box sections forming the bridge, with their associated wing walls and parapets, had been craned into position by 29 December so that rebuilding of the railway embankment could begin. The project was completed on time, and the railway was fully reinstated by 4am on 1 January 2022. The reinstatement of the canal involved constructing a clay lining and realignment of the towpath, followed by a programme of tree planting on the banks. This work was not completed until May, and an official opening took place on 23 May 2022. The new bridge won an award at the Institution of Civil Engineers at the 2022 South West Civil Engineering Awards ceremony for the best new build project costing under £8 million.

=== Progress ===
In a separate project, Severn Trent Water started a £25 million upgrade to the sewerage system in Stroud in 2021. One of the driving forces for the project was the fact that the main sewer passed through the canal just below Wallbridge Lock, severely restricting the depth of water at that point, and the Proprietors argued that Severn Trent had not obtained permission to put the pipe there. Over 2 miles (3.2 km) of main sewer were replaced by a larger diameter pipe, which passed under the canal at a lower level, removing the obstruction. The renewal project was expected to be completed by late 2023, and in May 2022, a tunnel boring machine named Florence was set to work to cut the 5-foot (1.5 m) diameter sewer beneath the canal and the Painswick Stream. Having tunnelled under both waterways, it reached the end of its first 935-foot (285 m) run near Lodgemore Lane in August 2022. A second tunnel boring machine named Suzanne was set to work in July 2022. The new sewers terminate at a combined sewage overflow (CSO) holding tank, 82 feet (25 m) in diameter and 92 feet (28 m) deep, designed to hold excess flow until it can be pumped to Stanley Downton sewage treatment works. The project was largely complete by April 2024, after which Galliford Try, the contractor for the scheme, was to remove the sewer pipes and the existing CSO tank at Wallbridge Lock to allow deeper draught boats to use the canal. This work was delayed, but the towpath at Wallbridge was closed on 13 July 2026 to enable the demolition to take place, and the removal of the pipe from the canal bed was celebrated in November 2026 when a trip boat carried members of the Cotswold Canals Trust, Stroud Valleys Canal Company, Severn Trent and Galliford Try along the newly-navigable stretch.

Map of the diverted River Frome, to allow the canal channel to be built beneath part of the M5 bridge

As part of the scheme, surface water from 9.6 acres (3.88 ha) of impermeable surfaces in Stroud town centre was fed into a new surface water sewer. This involved constructing 600 yards (550 m) of 12-inch (300 mm) pipework under the town centre, to reduce the volume of water entering the foul sewers during rainfall events, and hence reduce the risk of overflows into the River Frome. The surface water is discharged into the Stroudwater Canal. The final connection to the canal required 254 yards (232 m) of 24-inch (600 mm) pipe to be installed beneath car parks owned by a supermarket and the council. Major disruption was avoided by using a laser-guided auger to create this section.

Due to delays, the cost of the Cotswold Canals Connected project had increased from £20 million, and by mid-2024 was expected to be £30 million. At that time, money was in hand for all of the work between the Ocean railway bridge and Westfield Lock, but there was a shortfall of around £10 million for the section between the lock and Walk Bridge. In August 2025, a new bid was made to the National Lottery Heritage Fund to enable the "missing mile" to be completed. It was backed by £4 million of match funding, with Stroud District Council contributing £1.5 million and other amounts from Gloucester County Council, the Stroud Valley Canal Company and the Cotswold Canals Trust. An award of a further £6.46 million by the Heritage Lottery Fund was announced in November 2025. The connection to Saul Junction could be completed by 2029, in time for the 250th anniversary of the opening of the Stroudwater Canal. Work began on excavating the new channel from John Robinson Lock to the M5 underpass in July 2026, and was expected to be completed by the end of the year, although progress has been slowed by the discovery of archaeological remains.

In August 2026 the River Frome was diverted through an existing culvert to the south of the M5 bridge, to enable work to begin on constructing a new canal channel beneath the bridge. Work began on lowering the oil pipeline at Fromebridge in November 2026. The project is being managed jointly by Cotswold Canals Trust and Exoleum. The trust has created a bund and a temporary bridge over the canal to ease access to the worksite. A cofferdam will be created using sheet piling, so that a trench for the pipeline can be excavated. Exoleum will remove sections of the existing pipe, and construct a new length which will be lowered into the trench. The trust will also assist with removing the old pipe once it is disconnected.

=== Summary of works ===
The whole of Phase 1b was expected to be completed by 2025, but by 2024 had been pushed back to 2028. The project involves:

- the restoration of Whitminster, John Robinson and Dock locks. Restoration of Pike Lock was completed in 2023 apart from the fitting of new gates, while Blunder Lock and Newtown Lock were both previously operational and the gates have been replaced, enabling a tug boat to reach Pike Lock in December 2025.
- the diversion of the Bristol-Stanlow oil pipeline;
- the replacement of the un-navigable structures at Walk Bridge near Saul Junction, Whitminster Bridge, and Stonepitts Bridge. Bond's Mill Bridge was replaced in late 2025 and the new lift bridge was raised for the first time on 28 January 2026. Gloucestershire County Council approved a £1 million contribution towards the replacement of Walk Bridge in their 2025/26 budget.
- construction of around 1 mile (1.6 km) of new canal between John Robinson Lock and the A38 roundabout, including engineering the River Frome, and constructing Lower Westfield and Bristol Road locks. Planning permission to excavate the canal was obtained in February 2024.

Most of the money to restore the former Westfield Lock was given in remembrance of John Robinson by his family, and the lock has been renamed John Robinson Lock.

== Links to other waterways ==
The canal linked directly to the Severn Estuary (at Framilode) as originally constructed, and terminated in the east at Wallbridge Basin near Stroud town centre. The Thames and Severn Canal bypassed Wallbridge Basin around ten years after this, and continued across Stroud to climb the Golden Valley, following its opening through the Cotswold hills to Lechlade.

A junction between the Stroudwater Navigation and the Gloucester and Sharpness Canal (at Saul) came later when this new ship canal bypassed the hazardous tidal Severn, and dramatically reduced traffic on the short 'Old Stroudwater' segment from Saul to the river at Framilode, although it was still used by Forest of Dean coal shipments as the shortest journey. In the modern restoration era, the Old Stroudwater is now permanently abandoned, and unlikely to be restored as the ship canal offers a safer route in both directions.

== Points of interest ==
Point	Coordinates (Links to map resources)	OS Grid Ref	Notes
Framilode Junction with River Severn	51.7925°N 2.3616°W	SO751104	
Jn with Gloucester and Sharpness Canal	51.7821°N 2.3545°W	SO756093	
A38 new culverts	51.7652°N 2.3310°W	SO772074	
M5 obstruction	51.7586°N 2.3246°W	SO776067	
Ocean Jubilee Bridge	51.7441°N 2.2954°W	SO797050	
A419 bridge, Dudbridge	51.7421°N 2.2394°W	SO835048	
Jn with Thames and Severn Canal	51.7441°N 2.2253°W	SO845051	

== Water quality ==
The Environment Agency measures the water quality of the waterways in England. Each is given an overall ecological status, which may be one of five levels: high, good, moderate, poor and bad. There are several components that are used to determine this, including biological status, which looks at the quantity and varieties of invertebrates, flowering plants and fish. Chemical status, which compares the concentrations of various chemicals against known safe concentrations, is rated good or fail.

The water quality of the Stroudwater Navigation was as follows in 2019.

Section	Ecological Status	Chemical Status	Length	Catchment	Channel
Stroudwater Navigation (Dudbridge east)	Good	Fail	2.6 miles (4.2 km)		artificial
Stroudwater Navigation (Pike Lock to Ebley)	Moderate	Fail	2.7 miles (4.3 km)		artificial

These two sections are not connected. The upper section ends at Ebley Weir, where most of the water which enters the canal from Slad Brook, Painswick Stream and Ruscombe Brook discharges into the River Frome. The lower section starts a little further along the canal, with the gap between the two sections not monitored in 2019. Like most waterways in the UK, the chemical status changed from good to fail in 2019, due to the presence of polybrominated diphenyl ethers (PBDE), perfluorooctane sulphonate (PFOS) and mercury compounds, none of which had previously been included in the assessment.

== See also ==
- Stroudwater barge
- Canals of the United Kingdom
- History of the British canal system

== Bibliography ==
- Cumberlidge, Jane (2009). Inland Waterways of Great Britain (8th Ed.). Imray Laurie Norie and Wilson. ISBN 978-1-84623-010-3.
- Denny, Andrew (January 2021). "The lottery-winning waterway". Waterways World. ISSN 0309-1422.
- Felton, James (4 January 2022). "Rail bridge at the Ocean in Stonehouse completed on time". Stroud News and Journal. Archived from the original on 4 January 2022.
- Field, Clive (18 May 2018). "Heritage Lottery Fund Award explained". Cotswold Canals Trust. Archived from the original on 8 September 2018.
- Fisher, Stuart (August 2012). "Cotswold Canals returning to life". Waterways World. ISSN 0309-1422.
- Freeman, Rob (4 March 2021). "Severn Trent pumps £25m into Stroud improvements". Punchline. Archived from the original on 19 April 2021.
- Green, Colin (1999). Severn Traders. Black Dwarf Publications. ISBN 978-0-9533028-2-6.
- Hadfield, Charles (1969). The Canals of South and South East England. David and Charles. ISBN 978-0-7153-4693-8.
- Herbert, N M; Pugh, R B, eds. (1976). 'Stroud: Introduction' in A History of the County of Gloucestershire, Volume 11: Bisley and Longtree Hundreds pp99–104. University of London, Gloucestershire Victoria County History. ISBN 978-0-19-722745-9. Archived from the original on 1 June 2019.
- Hooper, Will (3 November 2023). "Stroud Sewerage Strategy Project: Part 2 (2023)". Water Projects Online. Archived from the original on 14 October 2024.
- Kajastie, Nia (15 July 2022). "Second tunnel boring machine launched for Stroud sewerage upgrade". Ground Engineering. Archived from the original on 3 August 2022.
- Kajastie, Nia (21 September 2022a). "Work progresses on £25M Stroud sewer network project". Ground Engineering. Archived from the original on 21 September 2022.
- Malcolm, Aimee (23 November 2022). "Ocean Jubilee Bridge wins prestigious award!". Cotswold Canals Trust. Archived from the original on 28 November 2022.
- McKnight, Hugh (1981). The Shell book of Inland Waterways. David and Charles. ISBN 978-0-7153-6884-8.
- Millington, R J (7 September 1995). "Floodplain Mapping - Model Study of the River Frome (Gloucestershire)" (PDF). Wallingford Water. Archived (PDF) from the original on 4 November 2018.
- Priestley, Joseph (1831). Historical Account of the Navigable Rivers, Canals, and Railways, Throughout Great Britain. Longman, Rees, Orme, Brown and Green. Archived from the original on 13 March 2016.
- Squires, Roger (2008). Britain's restored canals. Landmark Publishing. ISBN 978-1-84306-331-5.
- Stenning, Theo (2013). The restoration of the Cotswold Canals: August 2013 update (PDF). Gloucestershire Society for Industrial Archaeology. Archived from the original (PDF) on 1 December 2017.
- Twydell, John (Autumn 2021). "The Wallbridge sewer" (PDF). The Trow. Archived from the original (PDF) on 3 August 2022.
