= River Frome, Stroud =

River Frome
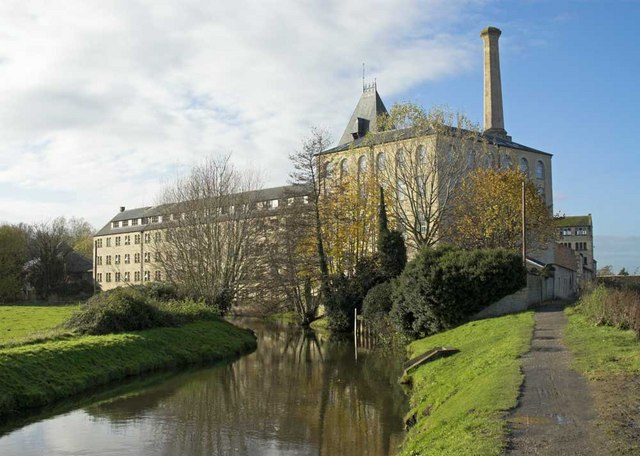
- River Frome near Ebley Mill

- Location within Gloucestershire

Location
- Country: England
- Counties: Gloucestershire

Physical characteristics
- Mouth
  - location: River Severn
  - coordinates: 51.7927°N 2.3613°W
- Length: 40 km (25 mi)
- Discharge
  - location: Ebley Mill
  - average: 2.6 m^{3}/s (92 cu ft/s)

The River Frome, once also known as the Stroudwater, is a small river in Gloucestershire, England. It is to be distinguished from another River Frome in Gloucestershire, the Bristol Frome, and the nearby River Frome, Herefordshire. The river is approximately 25 miles (40 km) long.

It flows broadly westwards, from its source high up on the Cotswold escarpment, initially through a narrow, steep-sided valley, which it shares with the Thames and Severn Canal and the Golden Valley line railway. Below Stroud, the main town on the river, it is swelled by flows from several tributaries, and the valley opens out, with the channel splitting into two before reuniting into a single channel. The river, as well as its tributaries, has been used for milling since the time of the Domesday Book. Some early mills were used for milling corn but subsequently the river was important for the woollen industry, until that experienced a series of depressions in the early 19th century. The area then became known for the production of walking sticks and umbrella sticks, an industry that lasted into the mid-20th century. Steam engines were installed from the 1810s onwards, but were often used to assist when water power was insufficient, rather than to replace water power. Despite the demise of milling, many mill buildings survive along the course of the river, a significant number of which are listed buildings, in recognition of their architecture.

The river has undergone modification over the years, not least to power the mills. There was an early attempt to make it navigable as far as Stroud, using cranes to move containers from boats at one level to those at another level, at places where a mill dam prevented through navigation. The scheme was abandoned before it was completed, due to the cost of construction and the time taken to tranship the containers. Communication was later provided by the Stroudwater Navigation, a separate canal which followed the route of the river from the River Severn to Wallbridge and opened in 1779. This was later extended through to the River Thames by the construction of the Thames and Severn Canal, which opened in 1789. Both are now part of the Cotswold Canals Trust, and are being restored. A small part of both canals near their junction is classified as a main river, because three of the tributaries of the Frome were diverted into them in the 1950s as part of a flood prevention scheme.

Despite the number of historical weirs and modern flood defence structures, the river is not classified as heavily modified, although the modification of its channel, together with the volume of water abstracted to supply the canals and for the drinking water industry, means that its water quality is only rated moderate under the terms of the Water Framework Directive, as both factors affect the ability of fish to move freely along the river.

== Course ==
The River Frome flows from high up on the Cotswold escarpment in the north east of its catchment, initially heading southwards, and then turning to the west. Just upstream of its junction with the Holy Brook or Holly Brook, at Whitehall Bridge it becomes a main river, as classified by the Environment Agency. It inhabits a steep-sided narrow valley, which it shares in the upper reaches with the Thames and Severn Canal and the Golden Valley line railway. It flows to the north to reach Stroud and then to the west again to Ebley Mill, where there is a gauging station to measure its flow. Below Stroud, it shares its course with the Stroudwater Navigation, which with the Thames and Severn is now part of the Cotswold Canals, which are undergoing restoration. The final section flows to the north-west, although much of its flow is then diverted into the Gloucester and Sharpness Canal to provide a drinking water supply for Bristol. For most of its length, the underlying bedrock is oolitic limestone and liassic sandstone. Below Ebley, the river valley widens into a floodplain, and the channel splits into two, which reunite at Churchend. Large parts of this final section are embanked, to protect low lying land from flooding.

=== Upper reaches ===
The Frome rises from several springs at Nettleton (about a mile southeast of Birdlip) and in springs at Climperwell Farm (southwest of Brimpsfield). The two branches meet just south of Caudle Green and Syde in Miserden Park, a grade II* listed house with park and garden, which was begun by Sir William Sandys in 1620, and remodelled in the 20th century by Edwin Lutyens after fire damage in 1919. The Frome continues to meander its way south passing the site of Edgeworth Mill and forming the western boundary of Pinbury Park, a wooded area containing early 20th-century terraced gardens and a country house dating from the 16th century. It continues to flow to the south and west past disused mills at Henwood and Dorvel to reach Daneway and Sapperton, where the derelict Thames and Severn Canal emerges from Sapperton tunnel. The canal is initially on the north bank of the river, and runs parallel to the river for most of the rest of its course. Holy Brook, which flows southwards, passes under the canal to join the river. As it enters Golden Valley to the north of Frampton Mansell, it is joined by the Golden Valley line, a railway which runs from Swindon to Gloucester and emerges from the Sapperton railway tunnel nearby.

Near Puck Mill Upper Lock, the canal crosses to the south side of the river, and there is a large reservoir, built to supply water to the Thames and Severn Canal. The reservoir is some 300 yards (270 m) long and could hold 3.25 million imperial gallons (14.8 Ml). In order to ensure it could be filled, the canal company bought Puck's Mill, which was located upstream from its intake. The mill house dates from the 17th century, with a 1960s extension. The river continues westwards to Chalford industrial estate, where it is crossed by the A419 Cowcombe Hill bridge and the canal. It is spanned by the New Mill at Bliss Mill, built by William Dangerfield in 1870, and consisting of three storeys with 18 bays. A small bridge with a single arch carries the Bisley to Minchinhampton road over the river. It was built around 1800 when the road was diverted. Below the bridge is the mill pond for Belvedere Mill, an early 19th-century cloth mill now reused as offices. Brookside is a detached three-storey house dating from the late 17th century, with two-storey additions made in 1730, which was part of Iles's Mill.

Both the river and canal are crossed by the railway, which moves to the north side of the valley. To the west is St Mary's Mill, build in 1820 for Samuel Clutterbuck. Nearby is St Mary's House, built for the mill owner in the late 16th century, and several weavers' cottages, some dating from the late 16th century and some from the late 17th century. A second mill building lies just to the north of St Mary's Mill. It dates from the early 18th century, and has a mid-19th-century chimney. After passing Wimberley Mills, a railway viaduct carries the railway back to the south side of the valley, passing between the buildings of Bourne Mills, on the southern edge of Brimscombe. The main mill building is to the north of the railway track, and consists of a four-storey block with a three-storey block forming an L-shaped plan. Most of it dates from the early 19th century, but one corner was cut off and rebuilt to allow for the construction of the Cheltenham and Great Western Union Railway in 1844, and the east wall appears to have been rebuilt at the same time. Nearby is another small mill building with three storeys, also dating from the early 19th century, which was probably once a gig mill, while to the south of the railway viaduct is a former wool stove, where scoured and dyed wool was heated to dry it out. Prior to cloth manufacture, there were two fulling mills there in 1690, and part of the site was used as a corn mill in 1820. By 1860, it was making mattress-wool, mill-puff and shoddy, which had been superseded by cabinet making by 1901. After making walking sticks in the mid-20th century, the site is now used for light industry, and the wool stove is used as a store.

To the western end of Brimscombe Port, where goods were transferred between trows from the River Severn and Thames barges from the Thames, was Port Mill. This was probably the site of Field's Mill, which was operational in the 17th century, but had been rebuilt as Port Mill by 1744. Brimscombe Port was constructed around 1785, and had to take account of the mill, with the canal crossing the river to the west of the mill. The mill consists of a central water tower with three ranges attached to it, and was used for cloth production until the early 20th century. In 1948 it became Benson's Tool Works, and has since been converted into offices. After Brimscombe Port, the river turns northwest towards Stroud. The large mill pond that formerly powered Brimscombe Mill is still fed by the river, but that for Hope Mill has been filled in. A trading estate occupies the site of the Phoenix Iron Works, after which is Ham Mill. This consists of a four-storey block dating from the early 19th century, with a three-storey west wing. The pit for the water wheel is thought to be intact within the wing. Nearby are two small bridges dating from the early or mid 18th century, which now stand in a private garden. The river continues through the Griffin Mill estate to reach Stafford Mills.

=== Below Stroud ===
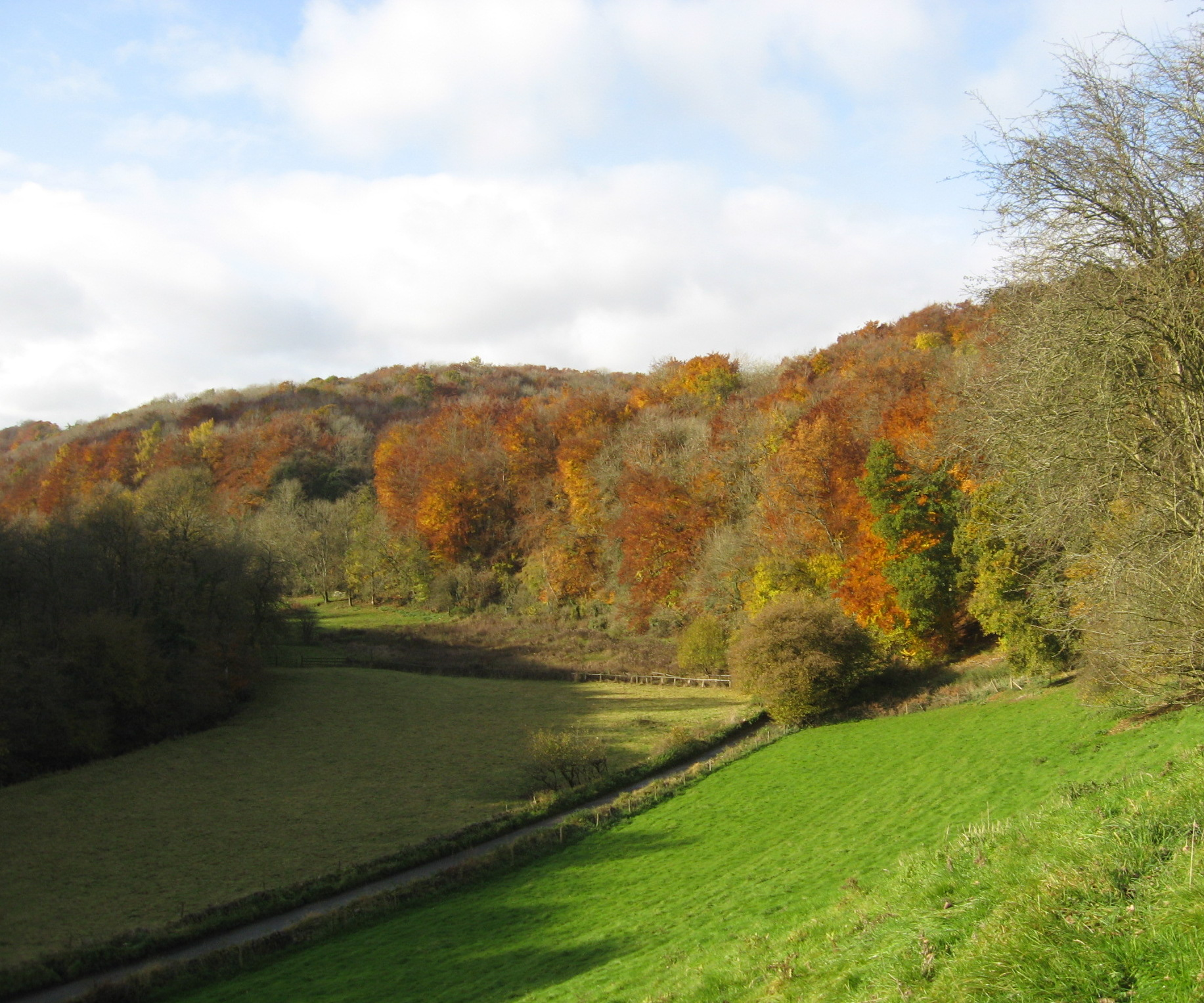
The Golden Valley in Autumn

At Bowbridge a 19th-century dye works, now used as a warehouse by Orchard and Peers is all that remains of Bowbridge Mill. The millpond for Arundell Mill still exists, and the associated 17th century dye works has become a carpenter's shop and a cottage. The canal crosses to the north side of the river, and a viaduct carries the railway over the river and Dr Newton's Way, a bypass built over the course of the canal, which now has its own bypass around the road. Beyond the viaduct is Stroud railway station. The narrow strip of land bordering the river to the south of the bypass is managed as Frome Banks nature reserve. It is owned by the county council, but day-to-day management is the responsibility of Gloucestershire Wildlife Trust and Stroud Valleys Project. The river loops in a semi-circle around the site of Wallbridge Mills, where the two-storey Wallbridge Mill Printing Department still stands, the building dating from the 18th century. The A46 Bath Road crosses before the river reaches Lodgemoor Mills, rebuilt in 1871–1873 to the designs of James Ferrabee, an architect from Brimscombe, after a fire destroyed the previous mill, dating from 1815. Nearby offices, cottages and a bridge form a group of listed buildings, which are complemented by Fromehall Mills, immediately downstream. The main building dates from the early 19th century, but some of the other buildings date from the 17th and 18th centuries.

The river continues under the A419/A46 roundabout at Dudbridge and is joined by the Nailsworth Stream, flowing northwards from Avening and Nailsworth. Just before the junction, Nailsworth Stream fed Dudbrige Flour Mill, a five-storey building dating from 1849 which is now hemmed in by the car park of a Sainsbury's supermarket. A little further to the west is Ebley Mill, a woollen mill that was built for Stanley and Stephen Clissold in 1818. A clock tower and extension were added in 1862, and the building was extensively refurbished in 1987-90 to become the offices for Stroud District Council. The next extant mill site is that of Ebley Corn Mills, where the present three-storey building dates from the early 19th century. Soon afterwards, the river splits into two channels at a series of weirs. The southern branch is crossed by the A419 Ebley bypass, which at this point follows the course of the former Nailsworth Branch of the Midland Railway. A large mill pond lies to the north of the channel, which formerly powered Stanley Mills. The mill building and offices date from 1813, with additional buildings dating from 1825. It was originally a five-storey L-shaped building, one of the early attempts to build a fireproof building, using a cast iron frame with brick cross vaulting and flagstone floors. Benjamin Gibbons manufactured the iron work, which is of exceptional quality, and the mill survived a major fire in 1884. Because of the quality of the brickwork and ironwork, the building is grade I listed. It was still used in the manufacture of cloth in 1985. The site also retains some storage buildings dating from 1815, and the power loom shed, built in 1854 to house the first power looms used at the mill.

The southern channel continues through the hamlet of Stanley Downton and under a viaduct on the Bristol to Exeter Railway to reach Beard's Mill. The workshops, dating from the late 18th century are listed buildings, and form a group with Leonard Stanley House, once the mill owner's house dating from 1800 and 1830 but now converted into three houses, and Splash Cottage, built for the mill manager in the late 18th century. Millend Mill was one of three built by the clothier Henry Hicks in the parish of Eastington between 1790 and 1820, this one occupying the site of a 14th-century mill. It had been converted to a corn mill by 1939, and was out of use by 1968. Shortly afterwards, the river rejoins the northern channel. From its beginning, this runs close to the Stroudwater Navigation and under the buildings which were formerly Ryeford Saw Mill. It then passes under the A419 Ebley Bypass, to reach Upper Mills, built in 1875 for the cloth manufacturer R S Davies. Beyond it, a late 18th-century bridge with two segmental arches carries Downton Road over the river, and to the south of Stonehouse the river passes through the railway embankment on the Bristol to Exeter Railway to reach Bond's Mill. The complex of channels further downstream were once part of Churchend Woollen Mills, and then the two channels reunite.

Map of the diverted river beneath the M5 motorway

An underpass was constructed when the M5 motorway was built, and this will be shared with the Stroudwater Navigation when that is restored to link it back to the Gloucester and Sharpness Canal. In August 2026, the river was diverted through an existing culvert to the south of the M5 bridge, to allow the channel beneath the bridge to be altered. A retaining wall will split the channel into two, with the canal at a lower level than the river. During flood events, the river is expected to overtop the wall, and the canal will be closed to navigation until river levels subside. Frome Bridge carries the A38 road over the river, which then powered Fromebridge Mill. There has been a mill at the site since the Domesday Book was compiled in 1086, and it has been used for corn, fulling, wire and brass, and the production of animal feed. The present building dates from the late 18th century, with 19th-century additions. On the final section, it occupies the course of the Stroudwater Navigation for a short distance, passes under the Gloucester and Sharpness Canal as two separate channels at Saul Junction and enters the River Severn at a sluice at Upper Framilode.

At Caudle Green the eastern side of the valley rises to the North Sea/Atlantic watershed, approximately one mile to the east. The Frome basin shares a length of this watershed feeding into the River Thames to the east (via the River Churn) and the Severn to the West (via the Frome).

== History ==
=== Navigation ===
There were several plans to make the Frome navigable, the first occurring between 1697 and 1700, for a scheme to upgrade the river from the Severn to Stroud. It would bring coal to the flourishing woollen industry, and carry away their finished products, but the plan faced concerted opposition from the large number of mill owners, who depended on the river for their water power. In 1728, a new scheme was proposed, for a navigable canal of 8.25 miles (13.3 km) with 12 locks. An Act of Parliament was obtained in 1730, with support from all of the mill owners above Stroud, but opposition from some below the town. Despite the mention of a canal, it was essentially a plan to enlarge and straighten the river, with some new cuts, and the locks were probably to be flash locks, with a single gate. Commissioners were appointed, but the scheme languished, with a growing feeling that making the river navigable was not possible because of the large number of mills.

One of the commissioners, John Dallaway, did not let the idea drop, and proposed a new scheme in 1754, running for 9.5 miles (15.3 km) from the Severn to Wallbridge. It would include 16 locks and four stanks, the precise details of which are unclear, and to prevent it affecting the mill owners, a 2-acre (0.8 ha) reservoir would be built at Wallbridge, which would be filled on Sundays, when the mills were not working. Over half of the money needed was subscribed, but the plan was dropped in 1756, when an alternative was suggested by John Kemmett, Thomas Bridge and two other gentlemen. This would involve building walls beside the mill weirs, some 12 feet (3.7 m) thick, on which cranes would be mounted. Cargo would be carried in boxes, which would be moved from a boat at one level to one at the other level by the cranes. An Act of Parliament was obtained in 1759, which specified 29 September 1761 as the date by which the work had to be completed. Some progress was made, but a six-year extension to the time limit was granted in 1761. Nearly 5 miles (8 km) of river were altered, probably from the Severn to Chippenham Platt, but the works were then abandoned. The boats were too large for the tiny river, the costs were prohibitive, while the difficulties of transferring the goods over 14 walls were likely to be time consuming and damaging to the cargo.

By 1774, the art of canal building was much better understood, and an Act of Parliament obtained in 1776 resulted in the construction of the Stroudwater Navigation. It was a canal separate from the river, which reached Chippenham Platt at the end of 1777, and was opened to Wallbridge, just under 8 miles (13 km) from the Severn at Familode Lock, on 21 July 1779. Navigation was extended up the valley by the opening of the first part of the Thames and Severn Canal to Brimscombe Port in 1784, and its completion through to the River Thames at Lechlade in 1789.

The river channel has undergone significant modification as a result of the large number of mills built along its length, and this can be seen in the number of splits where the river follows two parallel channels. There is also evidence of man-made channels, sections where the channel is perched higher than the surrounding land, and the remains of former channels. Between Whitminster and the hamlet of Wheatenhurst, the river and the Stroudwater Navigation were on a similar level, and the canal entered the river to cross from its north side to its south side at Whitminster lock. However, this arrangement proved to be unsatisfactory, since the river powered Whitminster Mill, and consequently river levels varied depending on how much water the mill was using, making navigation unreliable. The canal company built a new channel, and the river passed under it through the Lockham inverted syphon.

=== 20th century ===
The Thames and Severn Canal was abandoned in 1933 and the Stroudwater Navigation ceased to carry any trade in 1941, although it was not formally abandoned until the passing of Stroudwater Navigation Act 1954 (2 & 3 Eliz. 2. c. l). Shortly afterwards, the canal channel through Stroud was used as part of a flood relief scheme. The top gates of Lower Wallbridge Lock, Foundry Lock and Dudbridge Lock were replaced by concrete weirs, which maintained water levels at normal flows around 3.3 feet (1.0 m) lower than navigable levels had been. Three streams that formerly passed under the canal were diverted into it: Slad Brook (much of which is culverted under Stroud), Painswick Stream and Ruscombe Brook. Then at Ebley, the canal was joined to the river. As a consequence, this part of the canal is classed as a "main river".

As this section of the canal has now been restored and the locks put back into use, designs for reinstatement had to accommodate large flows and included underground bywash culverts, capable of carrying the full flood flow of all three streams. A new weir which carries a towpath bridge was constructed where the water leaves the canal to enter the River Frome, and a set of floodgates was constructed beyond the weir, to protect the canal from high water levels.

After the closure of the canal in 1954, land drainage work resulted in the Lockham syphon being removed. To the west of the syphon, the canal and river ran parallel to one another, with a narrow strip of land between them. To improve the capacity of the river channel, the intervening strip of land was removed, and bulldozed into the southern side of the canal. This produced a much wider channel for the river, consisting of the original channel together with the northern side of the canal. With funding for the reinstatement of the canal approved, this section should be navigable by 2028, and will involve the canal and river again sharing a channel, with the two parting at Whitminster lock, just upstream of Whitminster weirs.

Whitminster Mill had been demolished by 1880. In the early 1970s, the weirs at Whitminster were modified, so that much of the water flowing down the river could be diverted into the remains of the Stroudwater Navigation, and from there into the Gloucester and Sharpness Canal. This water is abstracted from the canal near Sharpness, and treated by Bristol Water's Purton Treatment Works. Work on the Purton site began on 24 August 1970, and a 46-inch (1.2 m) pipeline was constructed to carry the treated water to Pucklechurch service reservoir, 17.8 miles (28.6 km) away. The project cost £8.8 million and provided a new water supply for Bristol, with the works commencing operation in April 1973.

=== 21st century ===
The route of the river at Brimscombe Port is set to be changed as part of the redevelopment of the port for the reinstatement of the Thames and Severn Canal. Planning permission was obtained in March 2021 for infrastructure improvements, which include the demolition of modern additions to Port Mill. A new channel for the canal and a new bed for the river will be constructed further to the south, and the old river bed, which was culverted to allow Port Mill to be extended, will be filled in.

In 2022 and 2023, Severn Trent Water spent £22 million on upgrading the sewerage network in Stroud. One motivation for the project was that the main sewer pipe ran through the Stroudwater Navigation just below Wallbridge Lock at a height which severely restricted navigation. The proprietors of the canal argued that Severn Trent had not obtained permission to put the pipe there. Because Severn Trent did not want to build an inverted syphon to lower the pipe under the canal, they decided on a major reconstruction of Stroud's sewerage, involving the provision of 2.2 miles (3.5 km) of new sewer. While much of this was constructed using tunnel boring machines, two crossings beneath the Frome were too close to the surface for this to be a safe procedure. Galliford Try, the contractors, therefore built a temporary channel for the river, lined with coca matting and rock rolls to prevent large volumes of sediment being washed downstream. Dams were built to exclude water from the original channel, and 1,554 fish had to be relocated as the section was drained. Channels were then cut through the river bed, so that the gentle slope of the new sewer was maintained, after which the river course was reinstated. A new combined sewer overflow holding tank was also built, 82 feet (25 m) in diameter and 92 feet (28 m) deep, designed to hold excess flow until it can be pumped to Stanley Downton sewage treatment works. This will significantly reduce sewer flooding, resulting in an improvement of water quality in the river.

== Water power ==
The river has been used to provide power to mills along much of its length. The furthest upstream was Edgeworth Mill, where there was a mill and house for the miller dating from the 18th century. It was refurbished and extended in the mid-19th century, and later became a farm house. The building has not been changed much since its construction, although there are no obvious remains of the mill machinery. It was labelled as a corn mill in 1885.

Henwood Mill was built before 1707, for in that year it was part of the Daneway Estate in the parish of Bisley. It was constructed of stone, and was sold to Earl Bathhurst, who continued to operate it as a corn mill until the early 20th century. Soon after purchase, Earl Bathurst replaced the breastshot water wheel with a water turbine manufactured by Gilbert Gilkes of Kendal. Since operation ceased, the building has fallen down, and the turbine lies buried beneath rubble, which also makes it difficult to understand how the power from the turbine was utilised. The building was L-shaped, and there were two mill ponds, an upper and a lower one. The turbine was fed from the lower one.

Dorval Mill was constructed as a grist mill in the early 1760s by Earl Bathurst, who leased it to the miller William Fowler. On Fowler's death, it was acquired by the Thames and Severn Canal Company, and Richard William Walter Hancox was the last recorded miller. It probably ceased to operate in the late 1890s, but certainly by 1901, and had gradually fallen down. Most of the stone and ironwork have been robbed, and what remains lies beneath thick undergrowth.

Daneway Mill was a steam-powered saw mill, which relied on the Thames and Severn Canal to supply coal, and was operational by 1849. A portable steam engine drove several circular saws, the largest of which was 6 feet (1.8 m) in diameter. Most of the timber was sourced from the local woodland. As well as providing raw timber for use by local industries, at times it produced finished items, including barrel staves which were shipped to Birmingham, wooden block planes and wooden broom heads. Ernest Gimson, a resident of Daneway, used the wood to produce chairs, a process which was aided by a water-powered pole lathe. When the saw mill closed in 1914-15, the steam engine was sold on to a mill at Shipton Moyne near Tetbury.

When the Domesday Book was compiled in 1086, the manor of Bisley, which included the villages of Chalford and Stroud, had five mills. Three mills were recorded in Chalford in 1170, all belonging to the manor of Minchinhampton, with more further down river in Stroud. Some had become fulling mills by 1360, and although there were several small mills that were only ever used for corn milling, there were 24 sites where cloth production is known to have occurred within the manor. By 1831, the movement from agriculture to cloth production in Bisley was considerable, with 277 families obtaining their income from agriculture, and 677 from trade. Between 1750 and 1820, there were 39 cloth mills at Stroud and above, with another 16 downstream of Stroud. Several of the Frome's tributaries were also involved in cloth milling, with seven sites on the Toadsmoor Brook, eleven on Slad Brook, 25 on the Painswick Stream, three on Ruscombe Brook and 30 on Nailswick Stream.

The operation of so many mills on a relatively short river required significant engineering skill, both in the design of the channels and of the waterwheels, to gain the maximum amount of power at each site. Upstream mills had smaller amounts of water to play with, but the advantage that the water was available from early in the morning. Those further downstream had a greater volume of water, but it often did not start to flow until midday, after it had been released by the mills further upstream. The cloth industry was badly affected by a series of depressions from the early 19th century. In 1826, there were 2,026 people unemployed in the Chalford area, out of a population of under 6,000. Aid was received from the London committee for the relief of manufacturing districts. They were further affected in the 1830s, when the East India Company ceased trading, and a lucrative market in 'stripe' cloth with China consequently disappeared. Some people emigrated, to New South Wales in Australia, to Yorkshire and to Shrewsbury, but few of the cloth mills in Chalford survived, and they turned to the manufacture of silk and walking sticks instead.

From the early 1840s, the manufacture of walking sticks and umbrella sticks, with their handles and fittings, provided prosperity to many along the river. A significant proportion of the sticks were exported to the colonies and to India, until the gradual demise of the fashion for walking sticks in the 1930s and 1940s. A significant player in the industry was William Dangerfield, who started making walking sticks in 1845 at Gussage Mill, on the Toadsmoor Brook. The business prospered, and soon outgrew the premises. A new site was found at Bliss Mill, and the machinery was relocated to that site, although wooden components continued to be made at Gussage Mill. The workforce marched ceremoniously to the new site, accompanied by flags, banners and a brass band, and the site expanded, using other mill buildings and new buildings erected after a fire occurred in 1888. By 1876, 1,0006 people were employed at Bliss Mill, and an internal tramway was used to move materials around the site. Water power was replaced by steam power, when a 46 hp (34 kW) engine was obtained from a manufacturer in Gloucester. Other companies also made sticks, including Hoopers at Griffin Mill, which lasted until the mid-1930s, Henry S Hack who manufactured umbrella sticks at Bourne Mill until the 1960s, and the Chalford Stick Company, which occupied St Mary's Mill at Chalford in 1903, and continued to make walking sticks there until 1981. They then moved to Churches Mill at Woodchester, where they made walking sticks for the National Health Service until 1990, becoming the last survivor of the industry in the district. More than 20 mill sites were involved in the industry between 1840 and its demise.

With water power not always sufficient, there was a gradual transition towards steam power. The first mill to acquire a Boulton and Watt steam engine on the Frome system was Longfords Mill, Avening, on the Nailsworth Brook. They bought a 14 hp (10 kW) beam engine in 1814, and Bond's Mill at Eastington on the Frome bought a 10 hp (7.5 kW) beam engine in 1818. However, many of the mills only saw steam as supplementary power, and continued to rely on water power where they could. St Mary's Mill at Chalford reported that they only used their steam engine in very dry seasons, while William Lewis of Brimscombe had between 60 and 80 hp (45 and 60 kW) of water power, and a steam engine capable of producing 80 hp (60 kW), but only half of the steam power was actually used. St Mary's Mill claimed that their engine had been made by Boulton and Watt, but Boulton and Watt's records do not show that they supplied the engine. By 1850, there were steam engines totalling 806 hp (601 kW) powering the Gloucestershire woollen industry, which included mills on the River Cam and Little Avon River as well as the Frome system, while water power contributed 1,495 hp (1,115 kW), or 65 per cent of the total. The number of steam engines increased as the woollen industry gave way to other manufacturing processes, and these were in turn replaced by oil or gas engines, and finally by electric power.

== Cotswold Canals ==
Below Sapperton the Frome runs adjacent to the Thames and Severn Canal, parts of which have been restored, although much remains disused. The canal joins the Stroudwater Navigation at Wallbridge. The Stroudwater Navigation is fed by the Slad Brook and the Painswick stream. Changes to water drainage to reduce flooding, carried out by the Severn River Board in 1957 and 1958, resulted in the Ruscombe or Randwick brook discharging into the canal route instead of passing under it through a siphon beneath Foundry Lock. The Stroudwater Navigation runs parallel to the Frome for most of its length westwards from Stroud, and was an important and essential part of Stroud's growth as a town. The canal was a thriving thoroughfare for trade, putting Stroud on the map during the Industrial Revolution.

== Golden Valley ==
The valley from Chalford to Stroud, known as the Golden Valley, is one of Stroud's Five Valleys; it carries the Stroud-Swindon railway (known informally as the Golden Valley line) and the Thames and Severn Canal towards the Cotswolds. The Sapperton Valley nature reserve is one of several in the area.

The earliest mention of Golden Valley is as a reference in Isaac Taylor's map, dated 1777; following this, the first reference in literature is found in Samuel Rudder's 1779 History of Gloucestershire. The Place Names of Gloucestershire (1965) notes that Rudder's is the first written record and also notes that the valley is "doubtless so called from the wealth that came from its industries".

The name of the valley is occasionally falsely attributed to Queen Victoria, by whose time the name 'Golden Valley' had already entered common use. (Note: The Victoria County History for Gloucestershire (1976) notes that "Golden Valley in the south-east part [...] acquired its name by the late 18th century, either from its autumn hues or from the prosperity of the local cloth-mills," and refers to Isaac Taylor's 1777 map of Gloucestershire as a footnote. A Handbook for Travellers in Gloucestershire, Worcestershire, and Herefordshire, published in 1867, records, when describing the rail journey to Stroud, that "the traveller is carried along the side of a steep valley, thickly timbered, whose tints in autumn have given it the name the Golden Valley." Other references include the Journal of Horticulture, Cottage Gardener, Country Gentleman, Bee-Keeper, published in Country Life in 1870, ("golden valley in Stroud and beautiful it is"), and Paul Hawkins Fisher in his Notes and Recollections of Stroud, published in 1871, who describes the Golden Valley and notes that "in autumn it is all a-glow with the bright golden tints of its beech leaves.")

== Water quality ==
The Environment Agency measure the water quality of the river systems in England. Each is given an overall ecological status, which may be one of five levels: high, good, moderate, poor and bad. There are several components that are used to determine this, including biological status, which looks at the quantity and varieties of invertebrates, angiosperms and fish. Chemical status compares the concentrations of various chemicals against known safe concentrations and is rated good or fail.

The water quality of the Frome was as follows in 2019.

| Section | Ecological Status | Chemical Status | Length | Catchment | Channel |
|---|---|---|---|---|---|
| Frome - source to Ebley Mill | Moderate | Fail | 17.2 miles (27.7 km) | 34.62 square miles (89.7 km^{2}) | |
| Stroudwater Navigation (Dudbridge east) | Good | Fail | 2.6 miles (4.2 km) | | artificial |
| Frome - Ebley Mill to conf R Severn | Moderate | Fail | 7.6 miles (12.2 km) | 11.38 square miles (29.5 km^{2}) | |

The river has not been classed as good quality because of physical modification of the channel, which particularly affects fish populations. Historical weirs and modern flood protection structures prevent fish from moving freely along its course, and surface water abstraction, both for navigation on the Cotswold Canals and for the water industry, reduces its flow, again affecting fish. Like many rivers in the UK, the chemical status changed from good to fail in 2019, due to the presence of polybrominated diphenyl ethers (PBDE), perfluorooctane sulphonate (PFOS), and mercury compounds, none of which had previously been included in the assessment.
