= Frome Banks =

Nature reserve in Gloucestershire, England

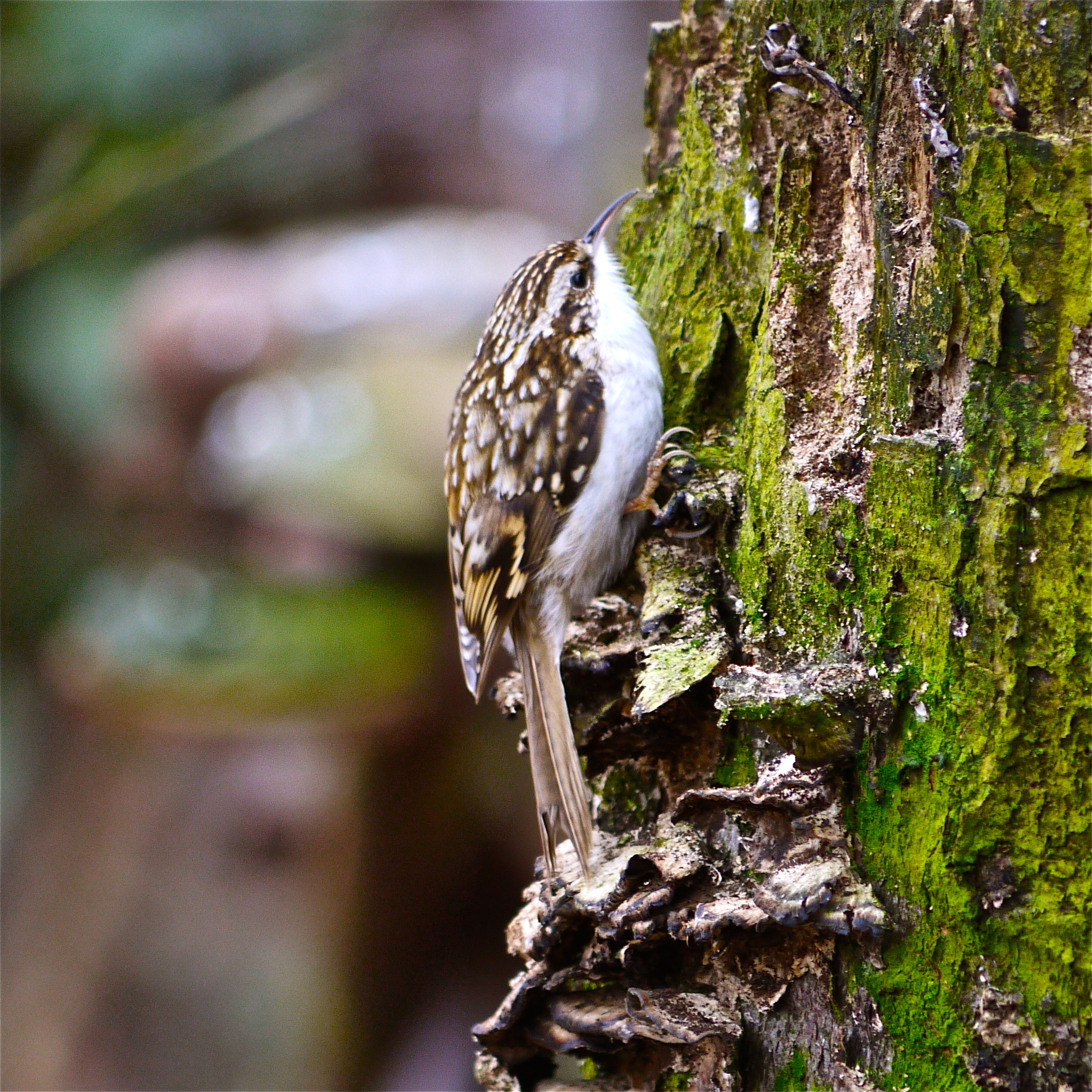
- Example – tree creeper (Certhia familiaris)

- Location within Gloucestershire
- Type: Gloucestershire Wildlife Trust nature reserve
- Location: between River Frome and Stroud by-pass
- Coordinates: 51°44′31.75″N 2°12′59.3″W
- Area: 3.2 acres (1.3 ha)
- Created: 1990
- Operator: Gloucestershire Wildlife Trust Gloucestershire County Council and private owner
- Status: Open all year

Frome Banks (grid reference SO851048) is a 1.3-hectare (3.2-acre) nature reserve in Gloucestershire.

The site is managed by the Gloucestershire Wildlife Trust under lease from Gloucestershire County Council and a private owner. The reserve was established in 1990. It is operated in partnership with the Stroud Valleys Project.

== Location and habitat ==
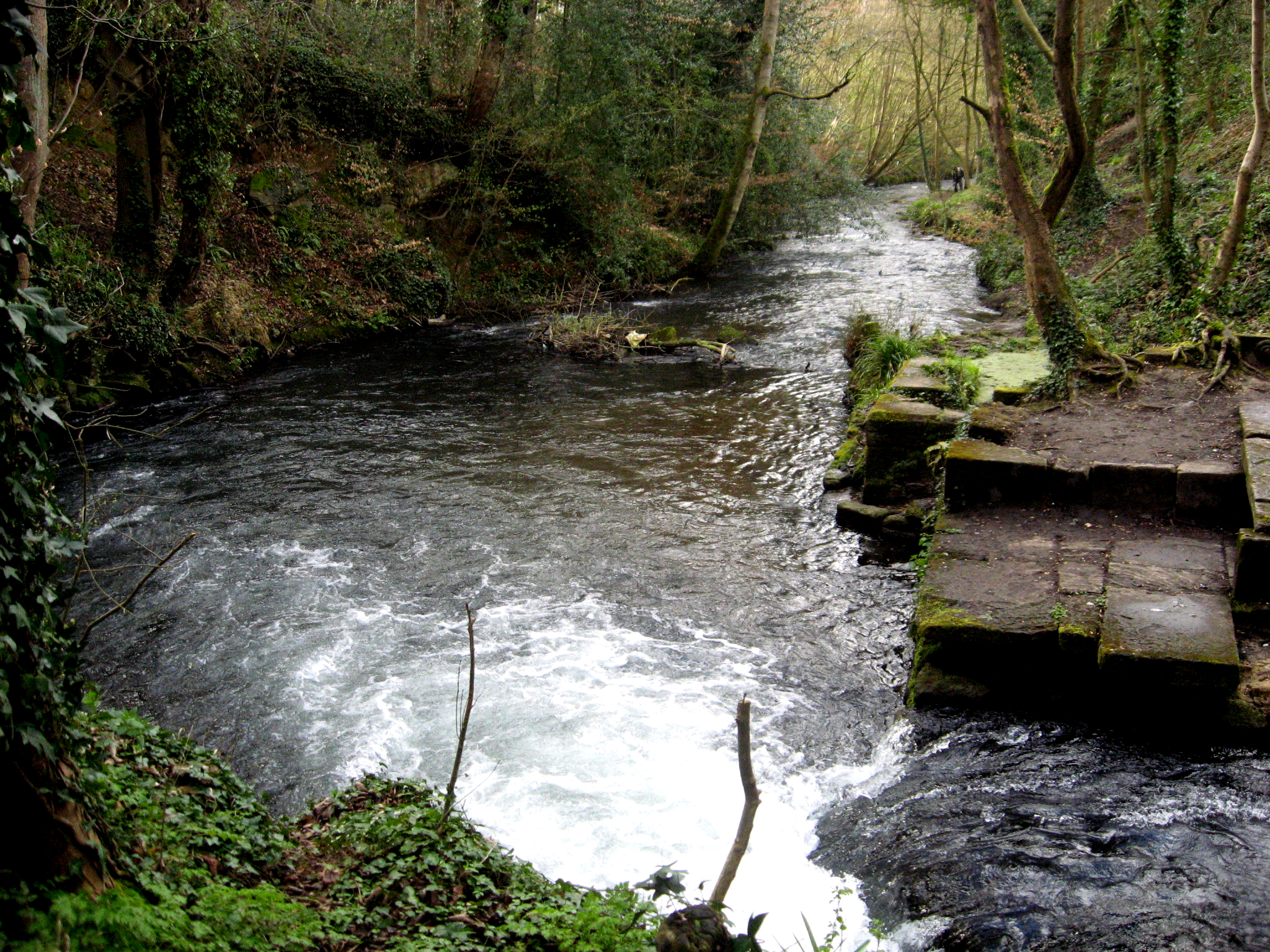
River Frome, Stroud, opposite Waitrose

The reserve is a narrow strip of land which lies between the River Frome and the Stroud by-pass. The by-pass is on the south side of the town. Stroud is below the escarpment of the Cotswold Hills and is surrounded by the Cotswold Area of Outstanding Natural Beauty. Access is from the A419 road, Dr Newtons Way, Stroud, between the Wallbridge and Waitrose roundabouts.

This is riverside woodland and a large part of it has grown up over an old rubbish tip. Thus land has been reclaimed with any dangerous material being removed first. There are public footpaths at both ends of this ribbon-like site which link with a permissive footpath. Rodborough Fields are on the opposite side of the river and footpaths link up for extended walks.

== Flora ==
The woodland is mostly made up of ash and sycamore. Also present are hazel, field maple, hawthorn, holly, guelder-rose, pedunculate oak, goat willow and beech. alder and crack willow grow along the river edge together with bushes of various species including cherry laurel.

There is a good range of flowers established. These include sanicle, common dog-violet, ramsons and ferns such as hart's tongue. The more open areas support plants such as common valerian, great willowherb, meadowsweet and Pendulous sedge. The river edges and wetter places support marsh-marigold, water mint, purple-loosestrife and yellow iris. water-crowfoot is seen in the river.

== Bird life ==
Woodland birds thrive in this reserve. Recorded are treecreeper, long-tailed tit, nuthatch, wren and chaffinch. Birds seen using the river include dipper, kingfisher, grey wagtail, moorhen and mallard.

== Conservation ==
The work carried out originally to make this area into part of Stroud's green heritage was carried out by Gloucestershire Wildlife Management, the Stroud Valleys Project and the British Trust for Conservation Volunteers (BTCV). The area was previously inaccessible. Maintenance work is needed to keep pathways clear, and to remove any timber which heavily shades areas, restricting the growth of the ground flora.

== Publications ==
- Kelham, A, Sanderson, J, Doe, J, Edgeley-Smith, M, et al., 1979, 1990, 2002 editions, 'Nature Reserves of the Gloucestershire Trust for Nature Conservation/Gloucestershire Wildlife Trust'
- "Nature Reserve Guide – discover the wild Gloucestershire on your doorstep" – 50th Anniversary, January 2011, Gloucestershire Wildlife Trust
