= The Gatehouse at Bonds Mill =

World War II defensive structure at Stonehouse, Gloucestershire

Coordinates: 51°44′44″N 2°18′02″W

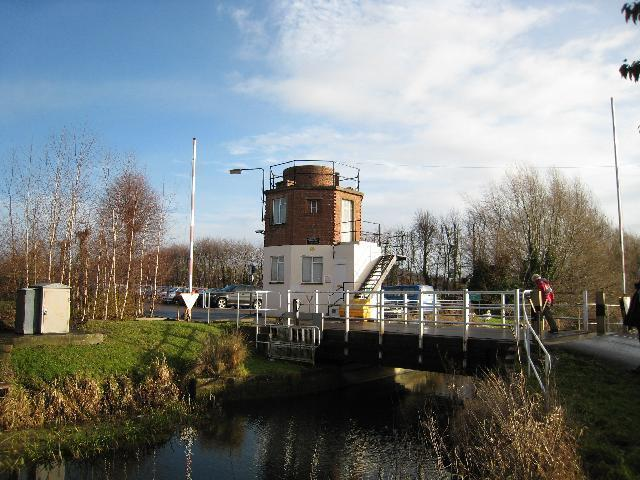
The pillbox and bridge

The Gatehouse at Bonds Mill at Stonehouse, Gloucestershire, England, was constructed during World War II as a defensive pillbox as part of the Stop Line Green. It is a rare example of a two-storey pillbox with a rooftop gun emplacement and is a Grade II listed building. It is now used as a visitor centre run by the Cotswold Canals Trust.

It was built in 1940, as one of sixteen pillboxes alongside the Stroudwater Navigation, a canal that links Stroud to the Severn Estuary. It has an octagonal floorplan based on the Type 24 pillbox, the ground floor being constructed of reinforced concrete and the upper storey is red brick. It is situated on the north side of the canal, across from the former Bond's Mill, which was being used during the war by Sperry as a dispersal factory to manufacture gyroscopic compasses. After the war it was adapted for use as a gatehouse for the mill and later to include hydraulic controls for the bridge that crosses the canal.

The historic swing bridge had survived the closure of the navigation in 1954, but had been widened and was no longer operable - it was in a very poor structural condition by the early 1990s. In 1994 the original bridge was replaced with the world's first composite plastic lift bridge for vehicular traffic, with the weight savings enabling reuse of the original abutments and no requirement for a counterweight.

The composite lift bridge was not in regular operation while awaiting restoration of the rest of the canal, and the deck structure and hydraulic lifting system deteriorated to the point where replacement was necessary as part of Cotswold Canals Connected Phase 1B. A temporary Bailey bridge was installed across the canal to allow the composite bridge to be removed. The new bridge deck, which is 57.3 feet (17.5 m) long by 17.9 feet (5.45 m) wide and weighs 46.589 tonnes was moved to site by road from Strensham services on the morning of 22 September and was craned into position on 4 November 2025. The temporary Bailey bridge was removed on 27 January 2026, and the lift bridge was raised for the first time on the following day, to allow a tug and an empty mud hopper to access the canal to the west of the site. The new bridge is a conventional steel/counterweight design similar to that fitted at Lodgemore.

While the bridge works were taking place the visitor centre was closed for about a year, to allow the project team to use it. With the work completed, the centre was refurbished and reopened on 1 March 2026. It is normally open on Sunday afternoons during the summer season.
