= Ruscombe Brook =

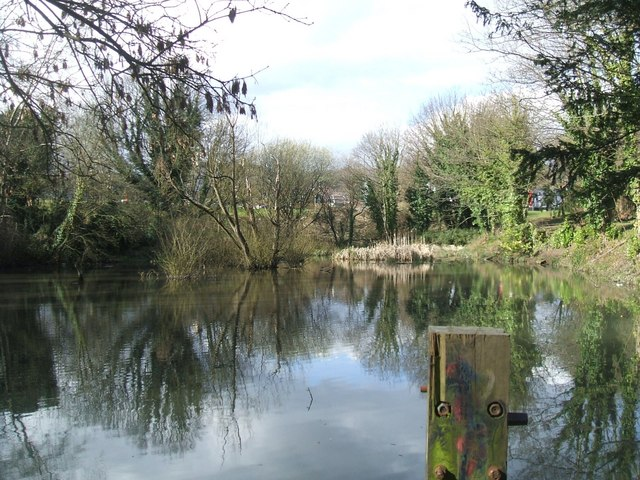
- The brook flows through the pond at The Lawn, Cainscross

- Location within Gloucestershire

Location
- Country: England
- Counties: Gloucestershire

Physical characteristics
- Source
  - location: Ruscombe
  - coordinates: 51.7652°N 2.2370°W
- Mouth
  - location: Stroudwater Navigation
  - coordinates: 51.7425°N 2.2377°W

Ruscombe Brook is a small river in Gloucestershire, England. It rises on the southern edge of the village of Ruscombe and flows southwards. At Puckshole it is joined on its right bank by a tributary originating near Randwick. It continues southwards and flows into the Stroudwater Navigation, although formerly it passed under the canal in a culvert and flowed into the River Frome. Historically, it supplied power to several water mills.

== Route ==
Ruscombe Brook rises as a series of springs to the south-east of the small village of Ruscombe, emerging from the Cotswolds limestone escarpment. To the east is Whiteshill, which is part of the civil parish of Whiteshill and Ruscombe. Near Ruscombe Farm it flows through a pond. It continues southwards to reach Humphries End, where it is joined on its right bank by its main tributary. This flows southwards from a series of springs near Randwick, turns towards the south-east, and passes under Ruscombe Road to reach the junction. The combined flow passes through Puckshole, and then between Hamwell Leaze to the west and Park End and Highfield to the east. A five-arched viaduct carries the Golden Valley Railway over the brook, which continues under the A4171 and A419 roads to reach Cainscross. It flows through another pond, and then empties into the Stroudwater Navigation close to Dudbridge Lock. Formerly, it flowed under the canal through a culvert, and continued to the west of Stroud Urban District Council's sewage works to enter the River Frome.

== History ==
Originally, Ruscombe Brook flowed into the River Frome to the north of Rodborough, passing under the Stroudwater Navigation at the tail of Foundry or Upper Dudbridge Lock. In the 1950s, when the canals were derelict, Slad Brook was diverted into the Thames and Severn Canal while Painswick Stream and Ruscombe Brook were diverted into the Stroudwater Navigation. This was part of a flood alleviation scheme, to reduce levels in the River Frome. The top gates at Lower Wallbridge Lock, the last lock on the Thames and Severn Canal, and the first two on the Stroudwater Navigation, Dudbridge Upper Lock and Dudbridge Lower Lock, were replaced by concrete weirs, which maintained levels in the canal about 3.3 feet (1.0 m) lower than they had been when the canal was navigable. The combined flow of the three watercourses rejoined the Frome at Ebley. When the canal was reinstated, a new weir which carries a towpath bridge was constructed where the water leaves the canal to enter the River Frome, and a set of floodgates was constructed beyond the weir, to protect the canal from high water levels. The floodgates were used for the first time in November 2012, after a period of heavy rain increased the volume of water entering the canal from the streams.

The canal includes a hydro-electric scheme, which utilises the flow from the first two streams. Contractors building the tailwash channel from the turbine broke into the culvert formerly used by Ruscombe Brook, which contained water leaking into it from Dudbridge Upper Lock. The base of the lock had to be repaired to remedy this.

== Milling ==
Despite its small size, the brook has supplied power to at least four water mills which were associated with the woollen industry, although some also served as corn mills. Following the river downstream, these were Ruscombe Mill, Puckshole Mill, Paganhill Mill, which was also known as Little Mill or Bournes Mill, and Ozlebrook Mill. All of the mills have been demolished. There was a fifth mill at Cainscross, which was used for milling corn.

Ruscombe Mill was part of the Ruscombe Farm estate, and the first documentary evidence for it dates from 1439. At the time it was a corn mill, and was still in use as a corn mill in 1728. A farmhouse has been recorded there since 1532, but the present building dates from around 1600. The farmhouse is a grade II listed structure, as is the nearby barn, which dates from the mid-18th century. The mill may have been used to produce cloth at some point, since it was leased by a clothier called Daniel Gardner in 1648, and by his son Giles Gardner in 1677, who also worked in the cloth trade. It had been demolished by 1819.

Puckshole Mill benefitted from the increase in flow as it was located below the confluence with the stream from Randwick. Thomas Ellery owned it in 1822, and it was subsequently taken over by Harman and Adey, who manufactured cloth. Their business failed in 1871, when they became bankrupt. It then became a corn mill, known as Vale Mill, and was still shown as operational in 1914. Although the mill building was demolished in 1936, the three-storey mill house, which dates from the early 18th century, still occupies the site.

Paganhill Mill may have been the one mentioned in a deed dating from 1679, when a former grist mill was sold to Thomas Warner of Paganhill. At the time of the sale, it was in use as a fulling mill, part of the process of producing woollen cloth. Warner was a clothier by trade. The mill was leased by various owners to tenants during the early 19th century, and from 1897 to 1906 was worked by the King family. By 1914 it was known as Little Mill, and was milling corn. There was a millpond with a sluice just to the north of the building. Other sources record that a new corn mill was built on the site in 1815, and that the mill house was used as the farm house for Little Mill Farm from 1936 until the 1960s.

Ozlebrook Mill was probably the corn mill leased by Mrs Field of Paganhill in 1736, which may have been a cloth mill as some point. By 1830 it was being operated by a grinder of shears called William Clutterbuck. It reverted to a corn mill, before being demolished. 1914 mapping shows a large pond, which begins to the north of the railway viaduct and continues through it, with a brewery located at its southern end. Carpenter's Brewery began trading in 1840, and closed in 1926, after a number of small brewery companies merged.

To the south of the brewery was a fifth mill. This was a corn mill, and was fed from a large mill pond. William Copner was working the mill in 1840, and a company called Butt & Skurray worked it between 1863 and 1889. The mill closed around 1890, after which the site was cleared, and the mill pond became an ornamental lake in the grounds of The Lawn, a large Victorian house. The house was demolished when its site was required for Cainscross roundabout, to improve the junction between the A419, the A4171 and the B4008 roads. Its grounds became a wildlife haven after they were adopted by the Stroud Community Land Trust.

== Water quality ==
Ruscombe Brook is in an Environment Agency catchment area where the only watercourse for which quality data is collected is the Dudbridge East section of the Stroudwater Navigation, which terminates where the flow from Ruscombe Brook, Painswick Stream and Slad Brook flow into the River Frome. They do not publish separate data for Ruscombe Brook.

There have been issues with water quality due to the leakage of sewage into the brook. In 2005, over 70 residents met with officers from the council and Severn Trent Water, as well as the member of parliament for Stroud, David Drew. The residents had removed sanitary products from the brook, filling two buckets in a single day. An environmental group called Vision 21 suggested that the creation of a reed bed would significantly improve the situation, at a relatively small cost, but Severn Trent, who had built over 200 reed beds in other locations, stated that they were not always appropriate, due to the amount of space they require. Sewage was still entering the brook six years later, when Severn Trent carried out remedial work on sewage pipes that run close to the brook in 2011. The pipework had become cracked, due to tree roots growing into them. The roots were cut back and a new lining inserted into the pipes to prevent further growth. The Ruscombe Brook Action Group had been campaigning for improvements since they were formed in 2005, and were also working to enhance the biodiversity of the brook.

== Bibliography ==
- Morgan, Kathleen; Smith, Brian S (1972). "Stonehouse: Economic history". Victoria County History. British History Online. pp. 276–284.
- Stenning, Theo (2012). The Restoration of the Cotswold Canals: August 2012 Update (PDF). Gloucestershire Society for Industrial Archaeology Journal for 2011.
- Tann, Jennifer (2012). Wool and Water. History Press. ISBN 978-0-7524-6215-8.
