= Pitchcombe =

Village in Gloucestershire, England

Coordinates: 51.766895°N 2.2174765°W

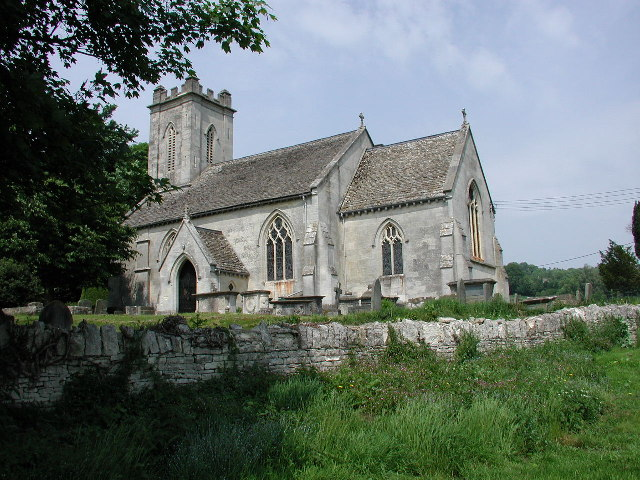

- Location within Gloucestershire
- Area: 2.034 km^{2} (0.785 sq mi)
- Population: 232 (2011 census)
  - Density: 114/km^{2} (300/sq mi)
- Civil parish: Pitchcombe
- District: Stroud
- Shire county: Gloucestershire
- Region: South West
- Country: England
- Sovereign state: United Kingdom
- Police: Gloucestershire
- Fire: Gloucestershire
- Ambulance: South Western
- Website: https://pitchcombepc.org.uk/

Pitchcombe is a village and civil parish 6 miles (9.7 km) south of Gloucester, in the Stroud district, in the county of Gloucestershire, England. In 2011 the parish had a population of 232. The parish touches Harescombe, Painswick and Whiteshill and Ruscombe.

== Landmarks ==
There are 27 listed buildings in Pitchcombe. Pitchcombe has a church called St John the Baptist and a village hall that was originally the village school.

== History ==
The name origin of "Pitchcombe" is uncertain and probably means 'Pincen's valley' but may mean 'pitch valley'. Pitchcombe has been called Pichelecumb, Pinchenecumbe and Pychecombe in the past. In 1327 Pitchcombe was in Standish parish.
