= Slad Brook =

River in Gloucestershire, England

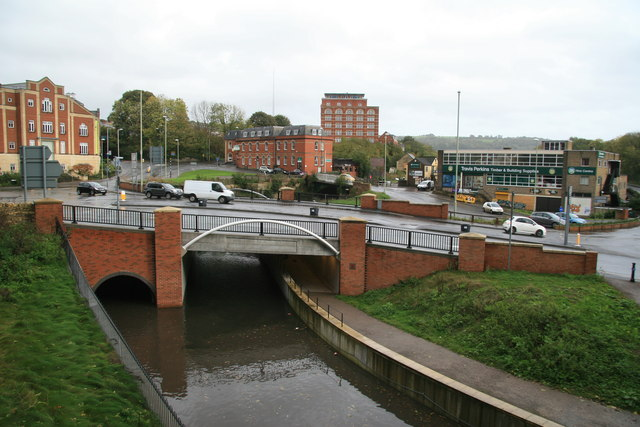
- Slad Brook enters the Thames and Severn Canal through the arch on the left of Stroud Brewery Bridge, Wallbridge

- Location within Gloucestershire

Location
- Country: England
- Counties: Gloucestershire

Physical characteristics
- Source
  - location: Ruscombe
  - coordinates: 51.7795°N 2.1629°W
- Mouth
  - location: Thames and Severn Canal
  - coordinates: 51.7443°N 2.2212°W

Basin features
- Tributaries
  - left: Dillay Brook

Slad Brook is a small river in Gloucestershire, England. It rises in woodland to the north of Down Hill, and to the south of the village of Sheepscombe. It heads in a southerly and south-westerly direction through open countryside until it reaches the north-easterly edge of Stroud. It is then culverted beneath the town. Formerly it was a tributary of the River Frome, but was diverted into the Thames and Severn Canal as part of flood defence works shortly after the canal was abandoned in 1954.

== Route ==
Slad Brook rises in Longridge Wood, to the north of Down Hill. It flows through a pond and around the north-western side of Down Hill. Its flow is swelled by water from several springs. After it passes to the west of Steanbridge Farm, it is crossed by a minor road, and joined by Dillay Brook on its left bank. Dillay Brook rises at Famish Hill, and is also swelled by a number of springs along its route. Below the junction, Slad Brook passes close to the hamlet of Steanbridge and to the east of the village of Slad. A small tributary from Elcombe joins on its left bank, and after being crossed by another minor road called Slad Lane, a tributary which rises to the east of the hamlet of The Vatch joins, also on the left bank. As it approaches Stroud, there are several short culverts, and then a much longer culvert, which ends at Stroud Brewery Bridge, WallBridge, where the river empties into the Thames and Severn Canal.

== History ==
The culverting of Slad Brook through Stroud appears to have occurred in the latter half of the 19th century. When the tithe maps were produced in 1839 and 1842, the river was still shown as running on the surface, but by the time the Ordnance Survey produced their map of 1882, the river had been culverted. Subsequently, there have been several occasions when Slad Brook has caused flooding. In July 1907 and August 1931, houses were flooded following severe thunderstorms. After the 1907 event, Philip Ford complained to Stroud Council that the stream, which he thought was effectively a sewer, had been a nuisance for some time. Ford was a counciller himself, and chairman of the Baths and Sanitary Committee, which was responsible for sewers. Two months later, the council decided that the stream was not a sewer and so was not their responsibility. A survey found that the culvert under the Painswick Inn was partially blocked, and they tried to get the brewery to deal with it. When they did not do anything, the council decided that the problem qualified as a statutory nuisance as defined by the Public Health Act 1875. Ultimately, the brewery paid the council to carry out the work on their behalf. Other parts of the brook also needed attention, with Stroud News reporting on 7 December 1907 that wood had been removed from the brook, and that riparian owners were prepared to pay their share of the cost of further work.

Property adjacent to Slad Brook was again affected by flooding in February 2001, August 2004, and in June and July 2007. Investigation after the July 2007 flooding found that parts of the culvert were affected by silting, reducing its capacity, and by rubbish blocking the grating where the culvert starts. Gloucester Speleological Society carried out a survey of the culverted section, to look for blockages. Some of the brook was culverted after 1882, and its size is quite variable. There are sections where the culvert is over 8 feet (2.4 m) high, and so the team could easily stand up, and others where they could barely get through, even when crouched down. After they reported what they had found, the Environment Agency investigated, and in February 2008 dug up the car park at Locking Hill Surgery to break into the culvert. Items removed included three surfboards, a bedstead, large plastic drums, and a lot of silt. The Environment Agency stated that those responsible for keeping rivers clear were the riparian landowners, but that they had carried out the work in this case because it would have been very difficult for riverside landowners to do it.

Prior to the 1950s, Slad Brook was a tributary of the River Frome. The Thames and Severn Canal, which runs parallel to the river near Stroud, was abandoned in 1933, while the Stroudwater Navigation, which it joins, ceased trading in 1941 and was formally abandoned by Act of Parliament in 1954. Shortly afterwards, Slad Brook was diverted into the Thames and Severn Canal, with Painswick Stream and Ruscombe Brook being diverted into the Stroudwater Navigation. This was part of a flood alleviation scheme, to reduce the amount of water entering the Frome in Stroud. The top gates of Lower Wallbridge Lock, Foundry Lock and Dudbridge Lock were replaced by concrete weirs, which maintained water levels at normal flows around 3.3 feet (1.0 m) lower than navigable levels had been.

When the canal was restored in the early 21st century, silt had to be removed from the canal channel between Wallbridge Upper and Lower Locks. This had been carried down Slad Brook and had settled out. Gabion baskets were used to slow down the outflow from the Slad Brook culvert, to prevent high flows from scouring the canal bed. Designs for reinstatement of the canals had to accommodate large flows and included underground bywash culverts, capable of carrying the full flood flow of Slad Brook and the other two streams. A new weir which carries a towpath bridge was constructed where the water leaves the canal to enter the River Frome, and a set of floodgates was constructed beyond the weir, to protect the canal from high water levels.

Slad Brook became a designated rapid response catchment in 2012, meaning that water levels rise rapidly after heavy rain, posing a significant flood risk. Following the 2007 floods, consideration was given to a flood storage scheme, but this was found not to be viable. Stroud District Council then supported various Community Flood Action Groups to look at the idea of a natural flood management scheme. This led to a partnership between Stroud District Council and the Environment Agency in May 2014, and the appointment of a project officer, funded by the Regional flood and coastal committee, initially for three years but later extended to six. The local community were keen that the project should not get bogged down by protracted planning and evaluation, and so the project officer worked with the National Trust and the Gloucestershire Wildlife Trust to implement natural flood management solutions. These include dams made from large woody debris, designed to slow peak flows and spread the water over a wider area so that it can soak into the ground, and soakaways on forest road culverts. As landowners have seen real progress, they have bought into the project, with many implementing or planning measures on their own land. A key factor has been dialogue with landowners, so that structures are placed where they will not have severe implications for farming practices.

Of the 684 interventions carried out under the scheme up to 2016, 122 were implemented on the Slad Brook. These included leaky dams and timber filled gullies, shallow in-field dams, soakaways where culverts cross tracks, with flow restrictions downstream of the crossing, and erosion prevention through the planting of trees and the provision of cattle drinking troughs. Assessment of the effects of the measures has been assisted by a river level gauge at Slad Road. The underlying geology is limestone, and large volumes of surface water have soaked into the ground to become groundwater. Comparison of a rainfall event in March 2016 with previous similar events suggested that peak water levels on the brook had been reduced by up to 3.3 feet (1 m) as a result of the interventions.

== Milling ==
The river has been used to provide power to water mills, particularly those associated with the woollen industry. Mills are known to have existed at eleven sites, with nine on the main channel and two more on a small tributary near The Vatch.

Steanbridge Mill, or The Jenny Mill, was the furthest upstream. It was operated by a clothier from 1763, and when it was advertised to be rented in 1815, it was described at being "employed wholly for machinery." It was worked until the second half of the 19th century. The present building dates from the early 18th century, and has been converted into a house. Historic England list it as two cottages, Steanbridge Mill and Upper Steanbridge Mill, dating from the later 17th century, and place them on Dillay Brook, rather than on the main channel of Slad Brook. They are grade II listed structures. Below the junction of Dillay Brook and Slad Brook, there is a pond on the north side of the river. Lower Steanbridge Mill was also known as The Weaving or The Slad Mill, as was located below the pond. It was worked from 1601 onwards, and from 1721 was owned by Henry Townsend. When he died in 1779, it was worked by his brother Theyer Townsend, who died in 1801, and then by his brother Charles Townsend until his death in 1803. It was left to a cousin who was an Anglican priest called Robert Lawrence. He changed his name to Robert Townsend, to respect the wishes of Charles, but then moved to a new parish at Bishop's Cleeve, where murals were produced depicting the mill and other parts of the Steanbridge estate. The mill had a 12-foot (3.7 m) overshot waterwheel in 1815, and two large waterwheels in 1853. It was demolished some time after 1895.

The next mill was called Wyatt's Mill or New Mill, which was working from around the time of the tithe survey of 1839/42, and was demolished some time after 1895. Vatch Mill was operated by the Clissold family during the 17th and 18th centuries, and was probably a fulling mill. There was a paper mill nearby in the late 18th century, known as Hermitage Mill, but sometimes also referred to as Vatch Mill. Vatch Mill was destroyed in a fire and rebuilt in 1827, with three steam engines producing a total of 66 hp and two water wheels producing 12 hp each. In 1838 Nathaniel Marling owned it, and added six power looms to supplement the five hand looms that were already there. The mills stopped operating before the 1890s. There was a second set of buildings, which were also known as Vatch Mill, powered initially by a small tributary, and later by steam engines. Upper Vatch Mill was further upstream, and was rebuilt in 1830. Tann shows both Vatch Mill and Upper Vatch Mill on a tributary to Slad Brook Historic England lists two attached cottages known as Upper Vatch Mill and dating from the 17th century. They are now a single dwelling, and are located to the south of the Upper Vatch paper mill, which was repurposed as a cloth mill around 1824 and rebuilt in 1830 and 1833. The mill was disused by 1882 and demolished by 1901. The cottages were derelict from the 1950s to the 1970s, but were refurbished as a single house in the late 1970s. The cottages are shown on Slad Brook, rather than the tributary. Vatch House is a 19th-century detached house, with some of its fabric dating from the 17th century. It is to the north of Slad Lane, and with Slad Cottages and Spring Cottages, covers a considerable length of Slad Brook.

Hazel Mill is known to have been active before 1798, and was used for the manufacture of cloth. From the 1850s until the 1870s it was used for grinding dyewood. The building has three storeys and dormer windows. There is a grade II listed house just to the west of it, which is also called Hazel Mill. The house dates from the late 17th century, with 18th, 19th and 20th century modifications. Historic England do not think the mill building is of special interest. Not much is known about Wade's Mill, the next downstream, except that it was used for grinding dyewood in the 1870s. Piggas or Peghouse Mill was a grain and fulling mill in 1639. Four looms were operational in 1802, and separate tenants made ropes on a rope walk. The mills and stoves were partially rebuilt in 1823, and by 1834 the site had a waterwheel, five stocks, five gigs, a steam engine, a press shop, a dyehouse and a drying house. The waterwheel was rated at 10 hp, and the steam engine at 30 hp. It was briefly used for paper making between 1846 and 1851, while in 1863 it was being used for silk throwing. The rope walk was stil in use at that time. By the 1870s it was again in use for cloth production, and there were 42 looms in use in 1889. Production continued into the early 20th century, after which the mill was demolished.

New Mills are known from documents dating from 1589. Thomas Bayliss rebuilt them in 1776 in Palladian style, and also built New Mills Court. Both the house and the mill were part of the same structure, which was designed to blur the distinctions between house and factory. Cloth production continued until 1898, when the mill shut down. New Mills Court including part of the mill still exists, although the buildings have been altered significantly. Little Mill, also known as the Mill behind the Church, was used for making cloth from 1671 until at least 1839. By 1856 it was in use as a saw mill and from 1863 until the 1890s was run by the Ockford family as a corn mill. From 1898 it was used by a cabinet maker, but the building burnt down in 1905. Slad Mill, which was close by, was built in the 1890s and expanded in the 20th century. It was a clothing factory until 1929, produced animal feed until 1936, and then became an engineering business until that was sold in 1975. The mill building was converted into flats some time after 2000. Badbrook Mill was used for cloth production from around 1822 until after 1844. It then became a flour mill until it burnt down in 1898. The final mill on Slad Brook was Cuttles Mill. Its water supply was supplemented by surplus water from the Thames and Severn Canal, which cascaded down a tumble weir. It was a fulling mill, and then was used for grinding shears in the later 18th century.

== Water quality ==
The Environment Agency measure the water quality of the river systems in England. Each is given an overall ecological status, which may be one of five levels: high, good, moderate, poor or bad. There are several components that are used to determine this, including biological status, which looks at the quantity and varieties of invertebrates, angiosperms and fish. Chemical status compares the concentrations of various chemicals against known safe concentrations and is rated good or fail.

The water quality of Slad Brook was as follows in 2019.

Section	Ecological Status	Chemical Status	Length	Catchment	Channel
Slad Brook source to conf Stroudwater Canal	Moderate	Fail	3.9 miles (6.3 km)	5.67 square miles (14.7 km^{2})	

The channel is not designated as artificial or heavily modified, despite the fact that some of the main causes of the water quality being rated less than good are related to physical modification of the channel. Like most rivers in the UK, the chemical status changed from good to fail in 2019, due to the presence of polybrominated diphenyl ethers (PBDE), perfluorooctane sulphonate (PFOS) and mercury compounds, none of which had previously been included in the assessment.

== Bibliography ==
- Hadfield, Charles (1969). The Canals of South and South East England. David and Charles. ISBN 978-0-7153-4693-8.
- Hartland, Fiona; et al. (May 2021). "Stroud Level 2 Strategic Flood Risk Assessment" (PDF). Stroud District Council. Archived (PDF) from the original on 27 September 2024.
- Tann, Jennifer (2012). Wool and Water. History Press. ISBN 978-0-7524-6215-8.
- Townley, Chas (2009). "Slad Brook Flooding 20 July 2007 - A preventable Flood?" (PDF). Stroud Town Council. Archived (PDF) from the original on 28 November 2024.
- Smith, Brian; Uttley, Chris (October 2016). "Stroud Rural SuDS Project: Community Engagement in NFM" (PDF). Shipston Area Flood Action Group. Archived (PDF) from the original on 2 December 2024.
