= List of acts of the Parliament of the United Kingdom from 1815 =

This is a complete list of acts of the Parliament of the United Kingdom for the year 1815.

Note that the first parliament of the United Kingdom was held in 1801; parliaments between 1707 and 1800 were either parliaments of Great Britain or of Ireland). For acts passed up until 1707, see the list of acts of the Parliament of England and the list of acts of the Parliament of Scotland. For acts passed from 1707 to 1800, see the list of acts of the Parliament of Great Britain. See also the list of acts of the Parliament of Ireland.

For acts of the devolved parliaments and assemblies in the United Kingdom, see the list of acts of the Scottish Parliament, the list of acts of the Northern Ireland Assembly, and the list of acts and measures of Senedd Cymru; see also the list of acts of the Parliament of Northern Ireland.

The number shown after each act's title is its chapter number. Acts passed before 1963 are cited using this number, preceded by the year(s) of the reign during which the relevant parliamentary session was held; thus the Union with Ireland Act 1800 is cited as "39 & 40 Geo. 3 c. 67", meaning the 67th act passed during the session that started in the 39th year of the reign of George III and which finished in the 40th year of that reign. Note that the modern convention is to use Arabic numerals in citations (thus "41 Geo. 3" rather than "41 Geo. III"). Acts of the last session of the Parliament of Great Britain and the first session of the Parliament of the United Kingdom are both cited as "41 Geo. 3". Acts passed from 1963 onwards are simply cited by calendar year and chapter number.

All modern acts have a short title, e.g. "the Local Government Act 2003". Some earlier acts also have a short title given to them by later acts, such as by the Short Titles Act 1896.

== 55 Geo. 3 ==
Continuing the third session of the 5th Parliament of the United Kingdom, which met from 8 November 1814 until 12 July 1815.

This session was also traditionally cited as 55 G. 3.

=== Public general acts ===
Short title	Citation	Royal assent
Long title
Account of Civil List Revenues Act 1815 (repealed)	55 Geo. 3. c. 15	23 March 1815
An act to amend an Act made in the Fifty second Year of His present Majesty, (Note: Civil List during King's Illness Act 1812 (52 Geo. 3. c. 6)) for making Provision for the better Support of His Majesty's Household, during the Continuance of His Majesty's Indisposition. (Repealed by Statute Law Revision Act 1873 (36 & 37 Vict. c. 91))
Loan from Bank of England Act 1815 (repealed)	55 Geo. 3. c. 16	23 March 1815
An act to continue and amend an Act, passed in the Forty eighth Year of the Reign of His present Majesty, (Note: Advance from Bank of England Act 1808 (48 Geo. 3. c. 3)) intituled "An act for empowering the Governor and Company of the Bank of England to advance the Sum of Three Millions towards the Supply for the Service of the Year One thousand eight hundred and eight." (Repealed by Statute Law Revision Act 1870 (33 & 34 Vict. c. 69))
Indemnity Act 1815 (repealed)	55 Geo. 3. c. 17	23 March 1815
An act to indemnify such Persons in the United Kingdom as have omitted to quality themselves for Offices and Employments, and for extending the times limited for the Purposes respectively, until the Twenty fifth Day of March One thousand eight hundred and sixteen; and to permit such Persons in Great Britain as have omitted to make and file Affidavits of the Execution of Indentures of Clerks to Attornies and Solicitors to make and file the same on or before the First Day of Hilary Term One thousand eight hundred and sixteen. (Repealed by Promissory Oaths Act 1871 (34 & 35 Vict. c. 48))
Annuity to Lord Walsingham Act 1815 (repealed)	55 Geo. 3. c. 18	23 March 1815
An act to settle and secure an Annuity on Lord Walshingham, in Consideration of his Services as Chairman of the Committees of the House of Lords. (Repealed by Statute Law Revision Act 1873 (36 & 37 Vict. c. 91))
Intoxicating Liquors (Ireland) Act 1815 or the Excise Duties and Licences (Ireland) Act 1815 (repealed)	55 Geo. 3. c. 19	23 March 1815
An Act to grant certain Duties of Excise upon Licences for the Sale of Spirituous and other Liquors by Retail, and upon Licences to Persons dealing in Exciseable Commodities in Ireland in lieu of the Stamp Duties payable upon such Licences, and to secure the Payment of such Excise Duties, and to regulate the issuing of such Licences, and to discourage the immoderate Use of Spirituous Liquors in Ireland. (Repealed by Licensing Act (Northern Ireland) 1971 (c. 13 (N.I.)))
Mutiny Act 1815 (repealed)	55 Geo. 3. c. 20	23 March 1815
An act for punishing Mutiny and Desertion; and for the better Payment of the Army and their Quarters. (Repealed by Statute Law Revision Act 1873 (36 & 37 Vict. c. 91))
Marine Mutiny Act 1815 (repealed)	55 Geo. 3. c. 21	23 March 1815
An act for regulating of His Majesty's Royal Marine Forces while on Shore. (Repealed by Statute Law Revision Act 1873 (36 & 37 Vict. c. 91))
Customs Act 1815 (repealed)	55 Geo. 3. c. 22	23 March 1815
An act to repeal the Duties of Customs payable on the Importation of Tobacco, and to grant other Duties in lieu thereof. (Repealed by Statute Law Revision Act 1861 (24 & 25 Vict. c. 101))
Customs Act (No. 2) 1815 (repealed)	55 Geo. 3. c. 23	23 March 1815
An act to repeal the Duties of Customs upon the Importation of Citrat of Lime, and to grant other Duties in lieu thereof. (Repealed by Statute Law Revision Act 1861 (24 & 25 Vict. c. 101))
Customs (Ireland) Act 1815 (repealed)	55 Geo. 3. c. 24	23 March 1815
An act to grant Duties of Customs on the Exportation of certain Goods, Wares and Merchandize, from Ireland, in lieu of the Duties of Customs heretofore payable on such Exportation. (Repealed by Customs Law Repeal Act 1825 (6 Geo. 4. c. 105))
Brown Linen Manufacture (Ireland) Act 1815 (repealed)	55 Geo. 3. c. 25	23 March 1815
An act for the better Regulation of the Manufacture of Brown Linens in Ireland. (Repealed by Linen Manufacturers (Ireland) Act 1825 (6 Geo. 4. c. 122))
Importation Act 1815 or the Corn Law (repealed)	55 Geo. 3. c. 26	23 March 1815
An Act to amend the Laws now in force for regulating the Importation of Corn. (Repealed by Importation of Corn Act 1828 (9 Geo. 4. c. 60))
Excise Act 1815 (repealed)	55 Geo. 3. c. 27	23 March 1815
An act to continue until the Fifth Day of July One thousand eight hundred and sixteen, certain Additional Duties of Excise in Great Britain. (Repealed by Statute Law Revision Act 1873 (36 & 37 Vict. c. 91))
Restriction on Cash Payments Act 1815 (repealed)	55 Geo. 3. c. 28	23 March 1815
An act for further continuing, until the Fifth Day of July One thousand eight hundred and sixteen, an Act of the Forty fourth Year of His present Majesty, (Note: Restriction on Cash Payments Act 1803 (44 Geo. 3. c. 1)) to continue the Restrictions contained in the several Acts of His present Majesty on Payments of Cash by the Bank of England. (Repealed by Statute Law Revision Act 1873 (36 & 37 Vict. c. 91))
Trade of Malta Act 1815 (repealed)	55 Geo. 3. c. 29	23 March 1815
An act to regulate the Trade between Malta and its Dependencies, and His Majesty's Colonies and Plantations in America; and also between Malta and the United Kingdom. (Repealed by Statute Law Revision Act 1861 (24 & 25 Vict. c. 101))
Excise (No. 2) Act 1815 (repealed)	55 Geo. 3. c. 30	23 March 1815
An act for granting to His Majesty, until the Fifth Day of April One thousand eight hundred and nineteen additional Duties of Excise in Great Britain, on Sweets, Tobacco, Snuff and Excise Licences. (Repealed by Statute Law Revision Act 1873 (36 & 37 Vict. c. 91))
Exportation and Importation Act 1815 (repealed)	55 Geo. 3. c. 31	2 May 1815
An act to amend certain Acts respecting the Exportation and Importation of Sugar, and further to regulate the Importation of Sugar, Coffee and other Articles, from certain Islands in the West Indies. (Repealed by Customs Law Repeal Act 1825 (6 Geo. 4. c. 105))
Customs Act (No. 3) 1815 (repealed)	55 Geo. 3. c. 32	2 May 1815
An act to rectify a Mistake in an Act of the present Session of Parliament (Note: Duties on Malt, etc. Act 1814 (55 Geo. 3. c. 3)) with respect to the Duties on Sugar imported from the East Indies; and for further continuing, until the End of Six Weeks from and after the Expiration of any Act or Acts of Parliament continuing the Temporary or War Duties upon Sugar imported into Great Britain certain Countervailing Duties, Drawbacks and Bounties, on Mined Sugar. (Repealed by Statute Law Revision Act 1873 (36 & 37 Vict. c. 91))
Customs Act (No. 4) 1815 (repealed)	55 Geo. 3. c. 33	2 May 1815
An act to continue, until the Fifth Day of July One thousand eight hundred and sixteen, certain Temporary or War Duties of Customs on the Importation into Great Britain of Goods, Wares and Merchandize. (Repealed by Statute Law Revision Act 1873 (36 & 37 Vict. c. 91))
Importation Act (No. 2) 1815 (repealed)	55 Geo. 3. c. 34	2 May 1815
An act to continue, until the Twenty fifth Day of March One thousand eight hundred and seventeen, an Act made in the Forty ninth Year of His present Majesty, (Note: Importation (No. 4) Act 1809 (49 Geo. 3. c. 25)) to permit the Importation of Tobacco into Great Britain from any Place whatever. (Repealed by Statute Law Revision Act 1873 (36 & 37 Vict. c. 91))
Excise (No. 3) Act 1815 (repealed)	55 Geo. 3. c. 35	2 May 1815
An act to grant to His Majesty an additional Duty of Excise on Tobacco in Ireland. (Repealed by Statute Law Revision Act 1861 (24 & 25 Vict. c. 101))
Customs Act (No. 5) 1815 (repealed)	55 Geo. 3. c. 36	2 May 1815
An act to grant to His Majesty a Duty of Customs on Tobacco imported into Ireland. (Repealed by Statute Law Revision Act 1861 (24 & 25 Vict. c. 101))
Exportation and Importation (No. 2) Act 1815 (repealed)	55 Geo. 3. c. 37	2 May 1815
An act to amend several Acts respecting the Exportation and Importation of Sugar into and from Ireland; and further to regulate the Importation into Ireland of Sugar, Coffee and other Articles, from certain Islands in the West Indies. (Repealed by Statute Law Revision Act 1861 (24 & 25 Vict. c. 101))
Bleaching Powder Act 1815 (repealed)	55 Geo. 3. c. 38	2 May 1815
An act to repeal so much of an Act of the last Session of Parliament, (Note: Excise (No. 3) Act 1814 (54 Geo. 3. c. 183)) as directs that no Bleaching Powder, made in Ireland and brought into Scotland, should be removed into England. (Repealed by Statute Law Revision Act 1873 (36 & 37 Vict. c. 91))
Greenland Whale Fisheries Act 1815 (repealed)	55 Geo. 3. c. 39	2 May 1815
An act to revive and continue, until the Twenty fifth Day of March One thousand eight hundred and twenty, several Laws relating to the Encouragement of the Greenland Whale Fisheries, and to the allowing Vessels employed in the said Fisheries to complete their full Number of Men at certain Ports. (Repealed by Statute Law Revision Act 1873 (36 & 37 Vict. c. 91))
Treasury Bills (Ireland) Act 1815 (repealed)	55 Geo. 3. c. 40	2 May 1815
An act for raising the Sum of Two millions three hundred and twenty three thousand seven hundred and fifty Pounds Irish Currency, by Treasury Bills, for the Service of Ireland, for the Year One thousand eight hundred and fifteen. (Repealed by Statute Law Revision Act 1873 (36 & 37 Vict. c. 91))
Restriction on Cash Payments (No. 2) Act 1815 (repealed)	55 Geo. 3. c. 41	2 May 1815
An act to continue, until Three Months after the ceasing of any Restriction imposed on the Bank of England from issuing Cash in Payment, the several Acts for confirming and continuing the Restrictions on Payments in Cash by the Bank of Ireland. (Repealed by Statute Law Revision Act 1873 (36 & 37 Vict. c. 91))
Jury Trials (Scotland) Act 1815	55 Geo. 3. c. 42	2 May 1815
An Act to facilitate the Administration of Justice in Scotland by the extending Trial by Jury to Civil Causes.
Weights and Measures Act 1815 (repealed)	55 Geo. 3. c. 43	2 May 1815
An Act for the more effectual Prevention of the Use of false and deficient Measures. (Repealed by Weights and Measures Act 1878 (41 & 42 Vict. c. 49))
Prize Vessels, etc. (Ireland) Act 1815 (repealed)	55 Geo. 3. c. 44	2 May 1815
An act for the Relief of the Captors of Prizes, with respect to the admitting and landing of certain Prize Vessels and Goods in Ireland; to continue in force until the Twenty fifth Day of March One thousand eight hundred and sixteen. (Repealed by Statute Law Revision Act 1873 (36 & 37 Vict. c. 91))
Southern Whale Fishery Act 1815 (repealed)	55 Geo. 3. c. 45	2 May 1815
An act for continuing the Premiums allowed to Ships employed in the Southern Whale Fishery. (Repealed by Customs Law Repeal Act 1825 (6 Geo. 4. c. 105))
Pauper, etc., Lunatics (England) Act 1815 (repealed)	55 Geo. 3. c. 46	2 May 1815
An act to amend an Act passed in the Forty eighth Year of the Reign of His present Majesty, (Note: County Asylums Act 1808 (48 Geo. 3. c. 96)) intituled "An act for the better Care and Maintenance of Lunatics, being Paupers or Criminals, in England." (Repealed by County Lunatic Asylums (England) Act 1828 (9 Geo. 4. c. 40))
Poor (England) Act 1815 (repealed)	55 Geo. 3. c. 47	12 May 1815
An act for procuring Returns relative to the Expence and Maintenance of the Poor in England; and also relative to the Highways. (Repealed by Statute Law Revision Act 1873 (36 & 37 Vict. c. 91))
Chaplains in Gaols, etc. (England) Act 1815 (repealed)	55 Geo. 3. c. 48	12 May 1815
An act for enlarging the Powers of Two Acts of His present Majesty, (Note: Gaols Act 1772 (13 Geo. 3. c. 58)) (Note: Houses of Correction Act 1782 (22 Geo. 3. c. 64)) for providing Clergymen to officiate in Gaols and Houses of Correction within England and Wales. (Repealed by Statute Law Revision Act 1873 (36 & 37 Vict. c. 91))
Return of Persons Committed, etc. Act 1815 (repealed)	55 Geo. 3. c. 49	12 May 1815
An act to procure Returns of Persons committed, tried and convicted for Criminal Offences and Misdemeanours. (Repealed by Criminal Returns Act 1830 (11 Geo. 4 & 1 Will. 4. c. 25))
Gaol Fees Abolition Act 1815 (repealed)	55 Geo. 3. c. 50	12 May 1815
An act for the Abolition of Gaol and other fees connected with the Gaols in England. (Repealed by Theft Act 1968 (c. 60))
County Rates Act 1815 (repealed)	55 Geo. 3. c. 51	12 May 1815
An act to amend an Act of His late Majesty King George the Second, for the more easy assessing, collecting and levying of County Rates. (Repealed by Middlesex County Rates Act 1831 (1 Will. 4. c. xlviii), County Rates Act 1852 (15 & 16 Vict. c. 81), Municipal Corporations Act 1882 (45 & 46 Vict. c. 50), Local Government Act 1933 (23 & 24 Geo. 5. c. 51) and London Government Act 1939 (2 & 3 Geo. 6. c. 40))
Customs Act (No. 6) 1815 (repealed)	55 Geo. 3. c. 52	12 May 1815
An act to revive and continue, until the Twenty fifth Day of March One thousand eight hundred and twenty, several Acts for charging additional Duties on Copper imported into Great Britain. (Repealed by Statute Law Revision Act 1873 (36 & 37 Vict. c. 91))
Duties on Property, etc. (Great Britain) Act 1815 (repealed)	55 Geo. 3. c. 53	12 May 1815
An act to revive and continue for One Year the Duties and Contributions on the Profits arising from Property, Professions, Trades and Offices in Great Britain. (Repealed by Statute Law Revision Act 1873 (36 & 37 Vict. c. 91))
Aliens Act 1815 (repealed)	55 Geo. 3. c. 54	12 May 1815
An act to repeal an Act of the last Session of Parliament, (Note: Aliens Act 1814 (54 Geo. 3. c. 155)) for establishing Regulations respecting Aliens arriving in this Kingdom, or resident therein; and to establish, for Twelve Months, other Regulations respecting Aliens arriving in this Kingdom, or residing therein, in certain Cases. (Repealed by Statute Law Revision Act 1873 (36 & 37 Vict. c. 91))
Land Revenue of the Crown Act 1815 (repealed)	55 Geo. 3. c. 55	12 May 1815
An act to enable the Commissioners of His Majesty's Woods, Forests and Land Revenues, to contract for the Purchase and Surrender of Crown Leases, and to sell His Majesty's Interest in the Thornhill estate, in the Parish of Stallbridge, in the County of Dorset, and in certain small Parcels of Land belonging to His Majesty's Subjects within the Royal Forests; and to remove Doubts as to Estates of The Crown, sold by Order of the said Commissioners, being exempted from the Auction Duty. (Repealed by Statute Law Revision Act 1861 (24 & 25 Vict. c. 101))
Greenwich Hospital Act 1815 (repealed)	55 Geo. 3. c. 56	12 May 1815
An act to authorize the Commissioners and Governors of the Royal Hospital for Seamen at Greenwich, to transfer a certain Sum in the Three Pounds per Centum Consolidated Annuities, now standing in the Name of the Corporation of the Chest of Greenwich, into the Name of the said Commissioners; and also to receive such Dividends as are now due upon such Annuities. (Repealed by Greenwich Hospital Outpensions, etc. Act 1829 (10 Geo. 4. c. 26))
South Sea Company Act 1815 (repealed)	55 Geo. 3. c. 57	12 May 1815
An act to repeal the Provisions of former Acts, granting exclusive Privileges of Trade to the South Sea Company, and to indemnify the said Company for the Loss of such Privileges. (Repealed by Statute Law Revision Act 1861 (24 & 25 Vict. c. 101))
National Debt Act 1815 (repealed)	55 Geo. 3. c. 58	12 May 1815
An act for granting Annuities to discharge certain Exchequer Bills. (Repealed by Statute Law Revision Act 1870 (33 & 34 Vict. c. 69))
Firearms Act 1815 (repealed)	55 Geo. 3. c. 59	12 May 1815
An Act for amending an Act of His present Majesty, to insure the proper and careful Manufacturing of Fire Arms in England, and for making Provision for proving the Barrels of such Fire Arms. (Repealed by Gun Barrel Proof Act 1855 (18 & 19 Vict. c. cxlviii))
Wills, etc., of Seamen, etc. Act 1815 (repealed)	55 Geo. 3. c. 60	25 May 1815
An act to repeal several Acts relating to the Execution of Letters of Attorney and Wills of Petty Officers, Seamen and Marines, in His Majesty's Navy, and to make new Provisions respecting the same. (Repealed by Pay of the Navy Act 1830 (11 Geo. 4 & 1 Will. 4. c. 20))
Assessed Taxes (Ireland) Act 1815 (repealed)	55 Geo. 3. c. 61	25 May 1815
An act to grant to His Majesty certain increased Rates, Duties and Taxes in Ireland, in respect of Windows, Male Servants, Carriages, Horses and Dogs, in lieu of former Rates, Duties and Taxes in respect of the like Articles. (Repealed by Assessed Taxes, etc. (Ireland) Act 1816 (56 Geo. 3. c. 57))
Excise (No. 4) Act 1815 (repealed)	55 Geo. 3. c. 62	25 May 1815
An act to grant to His Majesty certain increased Duties of Excise in Ireland on Malt. (Repealed by Statute Law Revision Act 1861 (24 & 25 Vict. c. 101))
Excise (No. 5) Act 1815 (repealed)	55 Geo. 3. c. 63	25 May 1815
An act to repeal the additional Duty on British-made Wine or Sweets granted by an Act of this Session of Parliament. (Note: Excise (No. 2) Act 1815 (55 Geo. 3. c. 30)) (Repealed by Statute Law Revision Act 1873 (36 & 37 Vict. c. 91))
East India Company Act 1815 (repealed)	55 Geo. 3. c. 64	25 May 1815
An act to explain and amend an Act of the Fifty third Year of His present Majesty, (Note: East India Company Act 1813 (53 Geo. 3. c. 155)) as far as relates to the granting Gratuities by the East India Company. (Repealed by Statute Law Revision Act 1873 (36 & 37 Vict. c. 91))
Militia (Medical Examination) Act 1815 (repealed)	55 Geo. 3. c. 65	25 May 1815
An act to amend the Laws relating to the Militia of Great Britain. (Repealed by Militia Act 1816 (56 Geo. 3. c. 64), Statute Law Revision Act 1873 (36 & 37 Vict. c. 91), Militia (Voluntary Enlistment) Act 1875 (38 & 39 Vict. c. 69), Militia Act 1882 (45 & 46 Vict. c. 49) and Territorial Army and Militia Act 1921 (11 & 12 Geo. 5. c. 37))
Excise and Customs Act 1815 (repealed)	55 Geo. 3. c. 66	25 May 1815
An act for allowing Makers of Oxygenated Muriatic Acid to take Salt Duty-free for making such Acid or Oxymuriate of Lime for bleaching Linen and Cotton; for repealing the Excise Duties on Glauber Salt, and on Bleaching Powder imported from Ireland; and to allow a further Drawback on Foreign Brimstone used in making Oil of Vitriol. (Repealed by Statute Law Revision Act 1861 (24 & 25 Vict. c. 101))
Assessed Taxes (Ireland) (No. 2) Act 1815 (repealed)	55 Geo. 3. c. 67	7 June 1815
An act to grant to His Majesty certain Duties and Taxes in Ireland, in respect of certain Male Servants, Carriages and Horses kept to be let to Hire. (Repealed by Assessed Taxes, etc. (Ireland) Act 1816 (56 Geo. 3. c. 57))
Highways, etc. (England) Act 1815 (repealed)	55 Geo. 3. c. 68	7 June 1815
An act to amend an Act of the Thirteenth Year of His present Majesty, (Note: Highways Act 1773 (13 Geo. 3. c. 78)) for the Amendment and Preservation of the Public Highways, in so far as the same relates to Notice of Appeal against turning or diverting a Public Highway; and to extend the Provisions of the same Act to the stopping up of unnecessary Roads. (Repealed by Highway Act 1835 (5 & 6 Will. 4. c. 50))
Madhouses (Scotland) Act 1815 (repealed)	55 Geo. 3. c. 69	7 June 1815
An act to regulate Madhouses in Scotland. (Repealed by Lunacy (Scotland) Act 1857 (20 & 21 Vict. c. 71))
Court of Session (Records) Act 1815 (repealed)	55 Geo. 3. c. 70	7 June 1815
An act for better regulating the Formation and Arrangement of the Judicial and other Records of the Court of Session in Scotland. (Repealed by Statute Law Revision Act 1873 (36 & 37 Vict. c. 91) and Public Records (Scotland) Act 1937 (1 Edw. 8 & 1 Geo. 6. c. 43))
Hawkers (Scotland) Act 1815 (repealed)	55 Geo. 3. c. 71	7 June 1815
An act to regulate Hawkers and Pedlars in Scotland. (Repealed by Hawkers Act 1888 (51 & 52 Vict. c. 33))
Glamorganshire Election Act 1815 (repealed)	55 Geo. 3. c. 72	7 June 1815
An act to fix the Election for Glamorganshire at a central Place within the said County. (Repealed by Statute Law Revision Act 1890 (53 & 54 Vict. c. 33))
Lotteries Act 1815 (repealed)	55 Geo. 3. c. 73	7 June 1815
An act for granting to His Majesty a Sum of Money to be raised by Lotteries. (Repealed by Statute Law Revision Act 1873 (36 & 37 Vict. c. 91))
National Debt (No. 2) Act 1815 (repealed)	55 Geo. 3. c. 74	7 June 1815
An act for granting Annuities to discharge certain Exchequer Bills; and for raising a Sum of Money by Annuities, for the Service of Great Britain. (Repealed by Statute Law Revision Act 1870 (33 & 34 Vict. c. 69))
Discovery of Longitude at Sea Act 1815 (repealed)	55 Geo. 3. c. 75	7 June 1815
An act to continue the Encouragement of Persons making Discoveries for finding the Longitude at Sea, or other useful Discoveries and Improvements in Navigation, and for making Experiments relating thereto; and for discharging certain Debts incurred by the Commissioners of the Longitude, in carrying the Acts relating thereto into Execution. (Repealed by Statute Law Revision Act 1873 (36 & 37 Vict. c. 91))
Local Militia (Great Britain) Act 1815 (repealed)	55 Geo. 3. c. 76	14 June 1815
An act to enable His Majesty, until the First Day of May One thousand eight hundred and sixteen, to accept the Services of the Local Militia, either in or out of their Counties, under certain Restrictions. (Repealed by Statute Law Revision Act 1873 (36 & 37 Vict. c. 91))
Militia Act 1815 (repealed)	55 Geo. 3. c. 77	14 June 1815
An act to authorize, under present Circumstances, the Drawing out and Embodying of the British and Irish Militia, or any Part thereof. (Repealed by Statute Law Revision Act 1873 (36 & 37 Vict. c. 91))
Stamps (Ireland) Act 1815 (repealed)	55 Geo. 3. c. 78	14 June 1815
An act to repeal the several Duties under the Care of the Commissioners for managing the Stamp Duties, in Ireland, and to grant new Duties in lieu thereof. (Repealed by Probate Duty (Ireland) Act 1816 (56 Geo. 3. c. 56))
Stamps (Ireland) (No. 2) Act 1815 (repealed)	55 Geo. 3. c. 79	14 June 1815
An act to regulate the Collection and Management of the Stamp Duties on Law Proceedings, Attornies, Solicitors, Proctors and Corporate Officers in Ireland. (Repealed by Probate Duty (Ireland) Act 1816 (56 Geo. 3. c. 56))
Stamps (Ireland) (No. 3) Act 1815 (repealed)	55 Geo. 3. c. 80	14 June 1815
An act to provide for the Collection and Management of Stamp Duties on Pamphlets, Almanacks and Newspapers, in Ireland. (Repealed by Stamp Duties on Newspapers Act 1836 (6 & 7 Will. 4. c. 76))
Stamps (Ireland) (No. 4) Act 1815 (repealed)	55 Geo. 3. c. 81	14 June 1815
An act to repeal the several Acts for the Collection and Management of Stamp Duties in Ireland, and to make more effectual Regulations for collecting and managing the said Duties in general. (Repealed by Probate Duty (Ireland) Act 1816 (56 Geo. 3. c. 56))
Customs, etc. Act 1815 (repealed)	55 Geo. 3. c. 82	14 June 1815
An act to grant Duties of Customs, and to allow Drawbacks and Bounties on certain Goods, Wares and Merchandize imported into and exported from Ireland, in lieu of former Duties, Drawbacks and Bounties; and to make further Regulations for securing the Duties of Customs in Ireland. (Repealed by Customs Law Repeal Act 1825 (6 Geo. 4. c. 105))
Customs, etc. (No. 2) Act 1815 (repealed)	55 Geo. 3. c. 83	14 June 1815
An act to regulate the Payment of the Duties of Customs on Foreign Goods imported into Great Britain from Ireland, or into Ireland from Great Britain; and of the Drawbacks on the Exportation of Goods the Growth, Produce or Manufacture of Great Britain or Ireland, having been imported into either Country from the other. (Repealed by Customs Law Repeal Act 1825 (6 Geo. 4. c. 105))
Indian Presidency Towns Act 1815 (repealed)	55 Geo. 3. c. 84	14 June 1815
An act to amend so much of an Act of the Thirty third Year of His present Majesty, (Note: East India Company Act 1793 (33 Geo. 3. c. 52)) as relates to the fixing the Limits of the Towns of Calcutta, Madras and Bombay; and also so much of an Act of the Thirty ninth and Fortieth Year of His present Majesty, (Note: Government of India Act 1800 (39 & 40 Geo. 3. c. 79)) as relates to granting Letters of Administration to the Effects of Persons dying intestate within the several Presidencies in the East Indies, to the Registrar of the Ecclesiastical Courts; and to enable the Governor in Council of the said Presidencies to remove Persons, not being British Subjects; and to make Provision for the Judges in the East Indies in certain Cases. (Repealed by Government of India Act 1915 (5 & 6 Geo. 5. c. 61))
Enlistment of Foreigners Act 1815 (repealed)	55 Geo. 3. c. 85	14 June 1815
An act to amend and continue for One Year, and until Twelve Months after the Termination of the present War by the Ratification of a Definitive Treaty of Peace, Two Acts of His present Majesty, (Note: Enlistment of Foreigners Act 1804 (44 Geo. 3. c. 75)) (Note: Enlistment of Foreigners Act 1806 (46 Geo. 3. c. 23)) for enabling Subjects of Foreign States to enlist and serve as Soldiers in His Majesty's Service; and to enable His Majesty to grant Commissions to Subjects of Foreign States to serve as Officers, under certain Restrictions. (Repealed by Statute Law Revision Act 1873 (36 & 37 Vict. c. 91))
Importation Act (No. 3) 1815 (repealed)	55 Geo. 3. c. 86	14 June 1815
An act to continue, until the Twenty fifth Day of March One thousand eight hundred and twenty, an Act made in the Forty sixth Year of His present Majesty, (Note: Importation (No. 4) Act 1806 (46 Geo. 3. c. 117)) for permitting the Importation of Masts, Yards, Bowsprits and Timber for Naval Purposes, from the British Colonies in North America. (Repealed by Statute Law Revision Act 1873 (36 & 37 Vict. c. 91))
Pilotage of Foreign Vessels Act 1815 (repealed)	55 Geo. 3. c. 87	14 June 1815
An act to relieve certain Foreign Vessels resorting to the Port of London, in respect of Pilotage; and to regulate the Mode of Payment of Pilotage on Foreign Vessels in the said Port. (Repealed by Pilotage Act 1825 (6 Geo. 4. c. 125))
Assaults (Ireland) Act 1815 (repealed)	55 Geo. 3. c. 88	14 June 1815
An act to amend an Act of the last Session of Parliament, (Note: Assaults (Ireland) Act 1814 (54 Geo. 3. c. 181)) for rendering more easy and effectual Redress for Assaults in Ireland. (Repealed by Offences Against the Person (Ireland) Act 1829 (10 Geo. 4. c. 34))
Court Houses (Ireland) Act 1815 (repealed)	55 Geo. 3. c. 89	14 June 1815
An act to amend an Act of the Fifty third Year of His Majesty's Reign, (Note: Court Houses (Ireland) Act 1813 (53 Geo. 3. c. 131)) for making Regulations for the building and repairing of Court Houses and Sessions Houses in Ireland. (Repealed by Statute Law Revision Act 1873 (36 & 37 Vict. c. 91), Statute Law Revision Act 1890 (53 & 54 Vict. c. 33) and Local Government (Ireland) Act 1898 (61 & 62 Vict. c. 37))
Limitation of Time (Ireland) (Canal Companies) Act 1815 (repealed)	55 Geo. 3. c. 90	14 June 1815
An act to explain an Act made in the Parliament of Ireland, in the Thirty second Year of His Majesty's Reign, (Note: Inland Navigation Act 1792 (32 Geo. 3. c. 15 (I))) relative to Inland Navigations there, so far as relates to the Limitation of Actions against Canal Companies and others. (Repealed by Statute Law Revision Act 1894 (57 & 58 Vict. c. 56))
Criminal Costs (Dublin) Act 1815 (repealed)	55 Geo. 3. c. 91	14 June 1815
An act for the Payment of Costs and Charges to Prosecutors and Witnesses, in Cases of Felony in Ireland. (Repealed by Statute Law Revision Act 1873 (36 & 37 Vict. c. 91))
Prisons (Ireland) Act 1815 (repealed)	55 Geo. 3. c. 92	14 June 1815
An act to amend an Act of the Fiftieth Year of His present Majesty's Reign, (Note: Prisons (Ireland) Act 1810 (50 Geo. 3. c. 103)) relating to Prisons in Ireland, so far as concerns Contracts for building or repairing such Prisons. (Repealed by Prisons (Ireland) Act 1826 (7 Geo. 4. c. 74))
Duty on Silk Handkerchiefs Act 1815 (repealed)	55 Geo. 3. c. 93	14 June 1815
An act to repeal the Duties payable on, and the Permission to enter for Home Consumption, Silk Handkerchiefs imported by the East India Company. (Repealed by Statute Law Revision Act 1873 (36 & 37 Vict. c. 91))
Herring Fishery (Scotland) Act 1815 (repealed)	55 Geo. 3. c. 94	14 June 1815
An act to continue and amend several Acts relating to the British White Herring Fishery. (Repealed by Inshore Fishing (Scotland) Act 1984 (c. 26))
Customs Act (No. 8) 1815 (repealed)	55 Geo. 3. c. 95	14 June 1815
An act to repeal the Duties payable on the Importation into Great Britain of solid Vegetable Extract from Oak Bark, and other Vegetable Substances used in the Tanning of Leather; and to grant a Duty in lieu thereof. (Repealed by Statute Law Revision Act 1861 (24 & 25 Vict. c. 101))
Purchase of Estate for Lord Nelson Act 1815	55 Geo. 3. c. 96	14 June 1815
An act to grant a further Sum of Money for purchasing an Estate to accompany the Title of Earl Nelson, and also to amend Two Acts of the Forty sixth (Note: Lord Nelson (Annuity) Act 1806 (46 Geo. 3. c. 146)) and Fifty third (Note: Settlement of Estate on Lord Nelson Act 1813 (53 Geo. 3. c. 134)) Years of His present Majesty's Reign, for making such Purchase.
Commissary Court of Edinburgh Act 1815 (repealed)	55 Geo. 3. c. 97	14 June 1815
An act to grant to the Judges of the Commissary Court of Edinburgh a fixed Salary in place of their present Salary and certain Fees and Payments. (Repealed by Statute Law Revision Act 1873 (36 & 37 Vict. c. 91))
Downpatrick Election Committee Act 1815 (repealed)	55 Geo. 3. c. 98	14 June 1815
An act to enable the select Committee on the Downpatrick Election to re-assemble, and to suspend the Transmission of the Warrants and other Proceedings for the Appointment of Commissioners to examine Witnesses in Ireland. (Repealed by Statute Law Revision Act 1873 (36 & 37 Vict. c. 91))
Duties on Malt (Ireland) Act 1815 (repealed)	55 Geo. 3. c. 99	22 June 1815
An act to make further Provisions for collecting and securing the Duties of Excise on Malt made in Ireland. (Repealed by Statute Law Revision Act 1861 (24 & 25 Vict. c. 101))
Stamp Duties (Ireland) Act 1815 (repealed)	55 Geo. 3. c. 100	22 June 1815
An Act to provide for the Collection and Management of Stamp Duties payable on Bills of Exchange, Promissory Notes, Receipts, and Game Certificates in Ireland. (Repealed by Inland Revenue Repeal Act 1870 (33 & 34 Vict. c. 99), Finance (No. 2) Act (Northern Ireland) 1928 (18 & 19 Geo. 5. c. 29 (N.I.)) and Statute Law Revision Act (Northern Ireland) 1954 (c. 35 (N.I.)))
Stamps Act 1815 (repealed)	55 Geo. 3. c. 101	22 June 1815
An act to regulate the Collection of Stamp Duties on Matters in respect of which Licences may be granted by the Commissioners of Stamps in Ireland. (Repealed by Inland Revenue Repeal Act 1870 (33 & 34 Vict. c. 99))
Duties on Leather Act 1815 (repealed)	55 Geo. 3. c. 102	22 June 1815
An act to repeal certain Duties on Leather dressed in Oil in Great Britain, or imported from Ireland. (Repealed by Statute Law Revision Act 1873 (36 & 37 Vict. c. 91))
Postage Act 1815 (repealed)	55 Geo. 3. c. 103	22 June 1815
An act to regulate the Postage of Ship Letters to and from, Ireland. (Repealed by Post Office (Repeal of Laws) Act 1837 (7 Will. 4 & 1 Vict. c. 32))
Spirits (Ireland) (No. 2) Act 1815 (repealed)	55 Geo. 3. c. 104	22 June 1815
An Act to make further Provisions for the issuing of Licences to Persons to deal in, retail, make, or manufacture Spirits and other Exciseable Commodities in Ireland. (Repealed by Licensing Act (Northern Ireland) 1971 (c. 13 (N.I.)))
Duties on Hides, etc. Act 1815 (repealed)	55 Geo. 3. c. 105	22 June 1815
An act to make further Provisions for collecting and securing the Duties of Excise on Hides and Skins tanned in Ireland. (Repealed by Statute Law Revision Act 1861 (24 & 25 Vict. c. 101))
Duty on Paper Hangings, etc. (Ireland) Act 1815 (repealed)	55 Geo. 3. c. 106	22 June 1815
An act to make further Provisions for collecting and securing the Duties of Excise on Paper printed, painted or stained in Ireland, to serve for Hangings and other Uses. (Repealed by Duties on Hides, etc. Act 1824 (5 Geo. 4. c. 55))
Richmond Lunatic Asylum (Ireland) Act 1815 (repealed)	55 Geo. 3. c. 107	22 June 1815
An act to regulate the Appointment of Governors of the Richmond Lunatic Asylum in Dublin. (Repealed by Richmond Lunatic Asylum Act 1830 (11 Geo. 4 & 1 Will. 4. c. 22))
Mutiny (No. 2) Act 1815 (repealed)	55 Geo. 3. c. 108	22 June 1815
An act for punishing Mutiny and Desertion; and for the better Payment of the Army and their Quarters. (Repealed by Statute Law Revision Act 1873 (36 & 37 Vict. c. 91))
Prisoners from Clackmanan Act 1815 (repealed)	55 Geo. 3. c. 109	22 June 1815
An act to enable the Sheriff Depute or Substitute and Justices of the Peace of the County of Clackmanan, to incarcerate Persons in the Gaol of the Royal Burgh of Stirling or the Common Gaol of the County of Stirling. (Repealed by Statute Law Revision Act 1950 (14 Geo. 6. c. 6))
Duties on Sweets, etc. (Ireland) Act 1815 (repealed)	55 Geo. 3. c. 110	28 June 1815
An act for charging certain Duties on Sweets or Made Wines in Ireland in lieu of former Duties. (Repealed by Statute Law Revision Act 1861 (24 & 25 Vict. c. 101))
Duties on Spirits (Ireland) Act 1815 (repealed)	55 Geo. 3. c. 111	28 June 1815
An act for the better collecting and securing the Duties on Spirits distilled in Ireland. (Repealed by Illicit Distillation (Ireland) Act 1831 (1 & 2 Will. 4. c. 55))
Duties on Paper (Ireland) Act 1815 (repealed)	55 Geo. 3. c. 112	28 June 1815
An act for the better regulating and securing the Collection of the Duties on Paper made in Ireland, and to prevent Frauds therein. (Repealed by Duties on Paper (Ireland) Act 1816 (56 Geo. 3. c. 78))
Duties, etc., on Glass, etc. Act 1815 (repealed)	55 Geo. 3. c. 113	28 June 1815
An act for altering certain Drawbacks and Countervailing Duties on Glass; for exempting Irish Glass Bottles from the Duty imposed by an Act of the last Session of Parliament; (Note: Duties on Glass, etc. (Ireland) Act 1814 (54 Geo. 3. c. 7)) and for exempting the Leather and Glass of Carriages belonging to certain Persons imported from Ireland for Private Use from Duty. (Repealed by Statute Law Revision Act 1873 (36 & 37 Vict. c. 91))
Supreme Court (Ireland) (Master of the Rolls) Act 1815 (repealed)	55 Geo. 3. c. 114	28 June 1815
An act to augment the Salary of the Master of the Rolls in Ireland, and to enable His Majesty to grant an additional Annuity to such Master of the Rolls, on the Resignation of his Office; and to regulate the Disposal of the Offices of the Six Clerks in the Court of Chancery in Ireland. (Repealed by Statute Law Revision Act 1890 (53 & 54 Vict. c. 33))
Russian Dutch Loan Act 1815 (repealed)	55 Geo. 3. c. 115	28 June 1815
An act to carry into effect a Convention made between His Majesty and the King of the Netherlands and the Emperor of all the Russias. (Repealed by Russian Dutch Loan Act 1891 (54 & 55 Vict. c. 26))
Registry of Ships Built in India Act 1815 (repealed)	55 Geo. 3. c. 116	28 June 1815
An act to make further Regulations for the Registry of Ships built in India. (Repealed by Lascars Act 1823 (4 Geo. 4. c. 80))
Importation and Exportation Act 1815 (repealed)	55 Geo. 3. c. 117	28 June 1815
An act to permit, until Six Weeks after the Commencement of the next Session of Parliament, the Importation into Great Britain and Ireland, in Neutral Vessels from States in Amity with His Majesty, of certain Goods, Wares and Merchandize; and to prohibit the Exportation of Copper; and to permit the Importation, in Neutral Vessels from States not in Amity with His Majesty, of certain Goods, Wares and Merchandize. (Repealed by Statute Law Revision Act 1873 (36 & 37 Vict. c. 91))
Customs and Excise Act 1815 (repealed)	55 Geo. 3. c. 118	28 June 1815
An act to regulate the Clearance of Vessels, and Delivery of Coast Bonds, at Creeks and Harbours in Great Britain; for exempting certain Ships and Vessels from being licensed by the Commissioners of Customs; for authorizing Officers of the Customs to seize Spirits removing without Excise Permits; and for preventing Frauds in overloading Keels and other Carriages used in conveying Coals for Exportation, or to be carried Coastwise. (Repealed by Customs Law Repeal Act 1825 (6 Geo. 4. c. 105))
Turnpike Roads Act 1815 (repealed)	55 Geo. 3. c. 119	28 June 1815
An act to enable the Trustees of Turnpike Roads to abate the Tolls on Carriages, and to allow of their carrying extra Weights in certain Dues. (Repealed by Turnpike Roads Act 1822 (3 Geo. 4. c. 126))
Census (Ireland) Act 1815 (repealed)	55 Geo. 3. c. 120	28 June 1815
An act to provide for the taking an Account of the Population of Ireland, and for the ascertaining the Increase or Diminution thereof. (Repealed by Census (Ireland) Act 1840 (3 & 4 Vict. c. 100))
Military Roads, etc. (Scotland) Act 1815 (repealed)	55 Geo. 3. c. 121	28 June 1815
An act to amend and explain an Act, passed in the Fifty fourth Year of His present Majesty, (Note: Military Roads, etc. (Scotland) Act 1814 (54 Geo. 3. c. 104)) for maintaining and keeping in Repair certain Roads and Bridges made in Scotland for the Purpose of Military Communication; and for making more effectual Provision for maintaining and repairing Roads made and Bridges built in Scotland, under the Authority of the Parliamentary Commissioners for Highland Roads and Bridges. (Repealed by Highland Roads (Scotland) Act 1819 (59 Geo. 3. c. 135))
Windsor Forest Act 1815 (repealed)	55 Geo. 3. c. 122	28 June 1815
An act to amend an Act of the Fifty third Year of His present Majesty, (Note: Windsor Forest Act 1813 (53 Geo. 3. c. 158)) for vesting in His Majesty certain Parts of Windsor Forest, in the County of Berks; and for inclosing the Open Commonable Lands within the said Forest. (Repealed by Wild Creatures and Forest Laws Act 1971 (c. 47))
Compensation for Works at Portsmouth Act 1815	55 Geo. 3. c. 123	28 June 1815
An act for making Compensation for Lands and Hereditaments taken for erecting Works at and near Portsmouth and Hilsea, in the County of Southampton, in pursuance of an Act made in the last Session of Parliament. (Note: Purchase for Works at Portsmouth Act 1813 (54 Geo. 3. c. 43))
National Debt (No. 3) Act 1815 (repealed)	55 Geo. 3. c. 124	28 June 1815
An act for raising the Sum of Thirty six Millions by way of Annuities. (Repealed by Statute Law Revision Act 1870 (33 & 34 Vict. c. 69))
Chelsea Hospital Act 1815 (repealed)	55 Geo. 3. c. 125	29 June 1815
An act to amend an Act of His late Majesty King George the Second, for the Relief of the Out Pensioners of the Royal Hospital at Chelsea. (Repealed by Chelsea Hospital Out-pensioners Act 1842 (5 & 6 Vict. c. 70))
Allowances to Foreign Officers Act 1815 (repealed)	55 Geo. 3. c. 126	29 June 1815
An act to authorize the allowing to Foreign Officers, Allowances equivalent in Amount to the Half Pay given to British Officers under the like Circumstances. (Repealed by Statute Law Revision Act 1873 (36 & 37 Vict. c. 91))
Embezzlement of Public Stores Act 1815 (repealed)	55 Geo. 3. c. 127	29 June 1815
An act to repeal an Act of the Fifty third Year of His present Majesty, (Note: Embezzlement of Public Stores Act 1813 (53 Geo. 3. c. 126)) for preventing the Embezzlement of Stores; and to extend the Provisions of the several Acts relating to His Majesty's Naval, Ordnance and Victualling Stores, to all other Public Stores. (Repealed by Public Stores Act 1875 (38 & 39 Vict. c. 25))
Admiralty (Signal Stations) Act 1815 (repealed)	55 Geo. 3. c. 128	29 June 1815
An act to enable His Majesty to acquire Ground necessary for Signal and Telegraph Stations. (Repealed by Statute Law Revision Act 1963 (c. 30))
Drawbacks, etc., on Tobacco, etc. Act 1815 (repealed)	55 Geo. 3. c. 129	4 July 1815
An act to increase the Drawbacks and Countervailing Duties on Tobacco; and to limit the Tonnage of Ships in which Wine may be exported when Duties are drawn back. (Repealed by Statute Law Revision Act 1861 (24 & 25 Vict. c. 101))
Payment of Forces Abroad Act 1815 (repealed)	55 Geo. 3. c. 130	4 July 1815
An act for further regulating the Issue and Payment of Money to His Majesty's Forces serving Abroad. (Repealed by Statute Law Revision Act 1873 (36 & 37 Vict. c. 91))
Half Pay of Officers, etc. Act 1815 (repealed)	55 Geo. 3. c. 131	4 July 1815
An act for discontinuing certain Deductions from Half Pay; and for further regulating the Accounts of the Paymaster General. (Repealed by Statute Law Revision Act 1873 (36 & 37 Vict. c. 91))
Trade in Spirits Act 1815 (repealed)	55 Geo. 3. c. 132	4 July 1815
An act to continue, until the End of the next Session of Parliament, an Act of the last Session of Parliament, (Note: Spirit Trade Act 1814 (54 Geo. 3. c. 149)) for regulating the Trade in Spirits between Great Britain and Ireland respectively. (Repealed by Statute Law Revision Act 1873 (36 & 37 Vict. c. 91))
Chelsea and Greenwich Hospitals Act 1815 (repealed)	55 Geo. 3. c. 133	4 July 1815
An act to grant further Powers to the Commissioners of Chelsea and Greenwich Hospitals with respect to Pensions on those Establishments. (Repealed by Chelsea and Kilmainham Hospitals Act 1826 (7 Geo. 4. c. 16) and Greenwich Hospital Outpensions, etc. Act 1829 (10 Geo. 4. c. 26))
Crown Pre-emption of Lead Ore Act 1815 (repealed)	55 Geo. 3. c. 134	4 July 1815
An act for altering the Rate at which The Crown may exercise its Right of Pre-emption of Ore in which there is Lead. (Repealed by Statute Law Revision (No. 2) Act 1890 (53 & 54 Vict. c. 51) and Statute Law (Repeals) Act 1969 (c. 52))
Customs Act (No. 9) 1815 (repealed)	55 Geo. 3. c. 135	4 July 1815
An act to alter the Conditions and Regulations under which Blubber and Train Oil of Newfoundland are admitted to Entry. (Repealed by Statute Law Revision Act 1861 (24 & 25 Vict. c. 101))
Kilmainham Hospital Act 1815 (repealed)	55 Geo. 3. c. 136	4 July 1815
An act for the Relief of the Out Pensioners of the Royal Hospital of Kilmainham. (Repealed by Chelsea Hospital Out-pensioners Act 1842 (5 & 6 Vict. c. 70))
Poor Relief Act 1815 (repealed)	55 Geo. 3. c. 137	4 July 1815
An act to prevent Poor Persons in Workhouses from embezzling certain Property provided for their Use; to alter and amend so much of an Act of the Thirty sixth Year of His present Majesty, (Note: Relief of the Poor Act 1795 (36 Geo. 3. c. 23)) as restrains Justices of the Peace from ordering Relief to Poor Persons in certain Cases for a longer Period than One Month at a Time; and for other Purposes therein mentioned, relating to the Poor. (Repealed by Poor Law Act 1927 (17 & 18 Geo. 5. c. 14))
Exmoor Forest Act 1815 (repealed)	55 Geo. 3. c. 138	4 July 1815
An act for vesting in His Majesty certain Parts of the Forest of Exmoor otherwise Exmore, in the Counties of Somerset and Devon; and for inclosing the said Forest. (Repealed by Crown Estate Act 1961 (9 & 10 Eliz. 2. c. 55) and Wild Creatures and Forest Laws Act 1971 (c. 47))
Duty on Spirits (Ireland) Act 1815 (repealed)	55 Geo. 3. c. 139	6 July 1815
An act to grant an additional Duty of Excise in Ireland, upon Spirits made or distilled from Corn or Grain. (Repealed by Statute Law Revision Act 1873 (36 & 37 Vict. c. 91))
Assessed Taxes (Ireland) (No. 3) Act 1815 (repealed)	55 Geo. 3. c. 140	6 July 1815
An act to make further Provisions for the Collection of certain Duties on Male Servants, Carriages and Horses; and in respect of Houses in Ireland. (Repealed by Assessed Taxes, etc. (Ireland) Act 1816 (56 Geo. 3. c. 57) and Statute Law Revision Act 1861 (24 & 25 Vict. c. 101))
South Sea Company's Privileges Act 1815 (repealed)	55 Geo. 3. c. 141	6 July 1815
An act to amend an Act made in this Session of Parliament (Note: South Sea Company Act 1815 (55 Geo. 3. c. 57)) to repeal former Acts granting exclusive Privileges of Trade to the South Sea Company, and to indemnify the said Company for the Loss of such Privileges. (Repealed by Statute Law Revision Act 1861 (24 & 25 Vict. c. 101))
Auction Duties Act 1815 (repealed)	55 Geo. 3. c. 142	6 July 1815
An act to reduce the Duties on all Sheep Wool the Growth of the United Kingdom, which shall be sold by Auction for the Growers or first Purchasers. (Repealed by Auctioneers Act 1845 (8 & 9 Vict. c. 15))
Bridges Act 1815 (repealed)	55 Geo. 3. c. 143	6 July 1815
An act to amend the Acts relating to the building and repairing of County Bridges. (Repealed by Highways Act 1959 (7 & 8 Eliz. 2. c. 25) and London Government Act 1963 (c. 33))
Purchases for Docks, etc., Dublin Act 1815 (repealed)	55 Geo. 3. c. 144	6 July 1815
An act to enable the Commissioners of Customs and Port Duties in Ireland, to purchase Premises for the erecting additional Docks, Warehouses and Offices, in Dublin. (Repealed by Customs Law Repeal Act 1825 (6 Geo. 4. c. 105))
Postal Service Act 1815 (repealed)	55 Geo. 3. c. 145	6 July 1815
An act to increase the Allowance to the Post Office in Ireland, in respect of Packet Boats to Great Britain. (Repealed by Post Office (Repeal of Laws) Act 1837 (7 Will. 4 & 1 Vict. c. 32))
Trade with French Colonies Act 1815 (repealed)	55 Geo. 3. c. 146	6 July 1815
An act to authorize His Majesty to regulate, until the First Day of July One thousand eight hundred and sixteen, the Trade with any French Colony which may come into His Majesty's Possession or remain Neutral. (Repealed by Statute Law Revision Act 1873 (36 & 37 Vict. c. 91))
Glebe Exchange Act 1815 (repealed)	55 Geo. 3. c. 147	6 July 1815
An act for enabling Spiritual Persons to exchange the Parsonage or Glebe Houses or Glebe Lands, belonging to their Benefices, for others of greater Value, or more conveniently situated for their Residence and Occupation; and for annexing such Houses and Lands, so taken in Exchange, to such Benefices as Parsonage or Glebe Houses and Glebe Lands, and for purchasing and annexing Lands to become Glebe in certain Cases, and for other Purposes. (Repealed for Ireland by Church of Ireland Acts Repeal Act 1851 (14 & 15 Vict. c. 71) and for England and Wales and Scotland by Endowments and Glebe Measure 1976 (No. 4))
Exchequer Bills Act 1815 (repealed)	55 Geo. 3. c. 148	6 July 1815
An act for raising the Sum of Four millions five hundred thousand Pounds, by Exchequer Bills, for the Service of Great Britain, for the Year One thousand eight hundred and fifteen. (Repealed by Statute Law Revision Act 1873 (36 & 37 Vict. c. 91))
Exchequer Bills (No. 2) Act 1815 (repealed)	55 Geo. 3. c. 149	6 July 1815
An act for raising the Sum of One million five hundred thousand Pounds, by Exchequer Bills, for the Service of Great Britain, for the Year One thousand eight hundred and fifteen. (Repealed by Statute Law Revision Act 1873 (36 & 37 Vict. c. 91))
Land, Tax, etc. Act 1815 (repealed)	55 Geo. 3. c. 150	6 July 1815
An act for rectifying Mistakes in the Names of the Land Tax Commissioners, and for appointing additional Commissioners and indemnifying such Persons as have acted without due Authority in Execution of the Acts therein recited. (Repealed by Statute Law Revision Act 1873 (36 & 37 Vict. c. 91))
Distillation of Spirits (Ireland) Act 1815 (repealed)	55 Geo. 3. c. 151	11 July 1815
An act to amend the Laws for imposing and levying of Fines, in respect of unlawful Distillation of Spirits in Ireland. (Repealed by Illicit Distillation (Ireland) Act 1831 (1 & 2 Will. 4. c. 55))
Holyhead Roads Act 1815 (repealed)	55 Geo. 3. c. 152	11 July 1815
An act for granting to His Majesty the Sum of Twenty thousand Pounds, to be issued and applied towards repairing Roads between London and Holyhead, by Chester, and between London and Bangor, by Shrewsbury. (Repealed by Statute Law (Repeals) Act 2013 (c. 2))
Postage (No. 2) Act 1815 (repealed)	55 Geo. 3. c. 153	11 July 1815
An act for granting certain Rates on the Postage of Letters to and from Great Britain, The Cape of Good Hope, The Mauritius and The East Indies; and for making certain Regulations respecting the Postage of Ship Letters, and of Letters in Great Britain. (Repealed by Post Office (Repeal of Laws) Act 1837 (7 Will. 4 & 1 Vict. c. 32))
Quartering of Soldiers Act 1815 (repealed)	55 Geo. 3. c. 154	11 July 1815
An act for fixing the Rates of Subsistence to be paid to Innkeepers and others on quartering Soldiers. (Repealed by Statute Law Revision Act 1873 (36 & 37 Vict. c. 91))
Duties on Spirits, etc. (Scotland) Act 1815 (repealed)	55 Geo. 3. c. 155	11 July 1815
An act to continue, until the Fifth Day of July One thousand eight hundred and sixteen, the Temporary Fourth Part of the Duties payable in Scotland upon Distillers Wash, Spirits and Licences imposed by an Act of the Fifty fourth Year of His present Majesty; (Note: Duties on Spirits (Scotland) Act 1814 (54 Geo. 3. c. 172)) and for enabling His Majesty by Order in Council to modify the Operations of the said Act, or reduce the Duties thereby imposed. (Repealed by Statute Law Revision Act 1873 (36 & 37 Vict. c. 91))
Transportation Act 1815 (repealed)	55 Geo. 3. c. 156	11 July 1815
An act to amend the Laws relative to the Transportation of Offenders; to continue in force until the First Day of May One thousand eight hundred and sixteen. (Repealed by Statute Law Revision Act 1873 (36 & 37 Vict. c. 91))
Evidence (Ireland) Act 1815 (repealed)	55 Geo. 3. c. 157	11 July 1815
An Act for the better Examination of Witnesses in the Courts of Equity in Ireland, and for empowering the Courts of Law and Equity in Ireland to Grant Commissions for taking Affidavits in all Parts of Great Britain. (Repealed by Judicature (Northern Ireland) Act 1978 (c. 23))
Conveyance of Prisoners (Ireland) Act 1815 (repealed)	55 Geo. 3. c. 158	11 July 1815
An act to enable Grand Juries to present additional Sums for Constables in Ireland, and for the secure Conveyance of Prisoners. (Repealed by Statute Law Revision Act 1873 (36 & 37 Vict. c. 91))
Hackney Carriages Act 1815 (repealed)	55 Geo. 3. c. 159	11 July 1815
An act to amend several Acts relating to Hackney Coaches; for authorizing the licensing of an additional Number of Hackney Chariots; and for licensing Carriages drawn by One Horse. (Repealed by London Hackney Carriage Act 1831 (1 & 2 Will. 4. c. 22))
Prize, etc. Act 1815 or the Prize Act 1815 (repealed)	55 Geo. 3. c. 160	11 July 1815
An act for the Encouragement of Seamen, and the more effectual Manning of His Majesty's Navy during the present War. (Repealed by Naval Prize Acts Repeal Act 1864 (27 & 28 Vict. c. 23))
Taxes (Scotland) Act 1815 (repealed)	55 Geo. 3. c. 161	11 July 1815
An act to amend and render more effectual an Act of the Fifty second Year of His present Majesty, (Note: Taxes (Scotland) Act 1812 (52 Geo. 3. c. 95)) to amend and regulate the Assessment and Collection of the Assessed Taxes, and of the Rates and Duties on Profits arising on Property, Professions, Trades and Offices, in that Part of Great Britain called Scotland. (Repealed by Taxes Management Act 1880 (43 & 44 Vict. c. 19))
Duties on Epsom Salts Act 1815 (repealed)	55 Geo. 3. c. 162	11 July 1815
An act to repeal the Excise Duties and Drawbacks on Epsom Salt. (Repealed by Statute Law Revision Act 1873 (36 & 37 Vict. c. 91))
Customs Act (No. 10) 1815 (repealed)	55 Geo. 3. c. 163	11 July 1815
An act to regulate the issuing of Licences to allow Open Boats to proceed to Foreign Parts, and for revoking the same when necessary. (Repealed by Statute Law Revision Act 1861 (24 & 25 Vict. c. 101))
Duty on Foreign Spirits Act 1815 (repealed)	55 Geo. 3. c. 164	11 July 1815
An act to exonerate, in certain Cases, Foreign Spirits imported during the Suspension of the Spirit Intercourse between Great Britain and Ireland, from the additional Duty imposed thereon. (Repealed by Statute Law Revision Act 1873 (36 & 37 Vict. c. 91))
Militia Pay (Great Britain) Act 1815 (repealed)	55 Geo. 3. c. 165	11 July 1815
An act to defray the Charge of the Pay, Clothing and Contingent Expences of the Disembodied Militia in Great Britain, and of the Miners of Cornwall and Devon; and for granting Allowances, in certain Cases, to Subaltern Officers, Adjutants, Surgeons' Mates and Serjeant Majors of Militia, until the Twenty fifth Day of March One thousand eight hundred and sixteen. (Repealed by Statute Law Revision Act 1873 (36 & 37 Vict. c. 91))
Local Militia Pay (Great Britain) Act 1815 (repealed)	55 Geo. 3. c. 166	11 July 1815
An act for defraying the Charge of the Pay and Clothing of the Local Militia in Great Britain, to the Twenty fifth Day of March One thousand eight hundred and sixteen. (Repealed by Statute Law Revision Act 1873 (36 & 37 Vict. c. 91))
Militia Pay (Ireland) Act 1815 (repealed)	55 Geo. 3. c. 167	11 July 1815
An act for defraying, until the Twenty fifth Day of June One thousand eight hundred and sixteen, the Charge of the Pay and Clothing of the Militia of Ireland; and for making Allowances in certain Cases to Subaltern Officers of the said Militia during Peace. (Repealed by Statute Law Revision Act 1873 (36 & 37 Vict. c. 91))
Militia (No. 2) Act 1815 (repealed)	55 Geo. 3. c. 168	11 July 1815
An act to explain and amend the Laws relating to the Militias of Great Britain and Ireland. (Repealed by Militia (Voluntary Enlistment) Act 1875 (38 & 39 Vict. c. 69))
National Debt (No. 4) Act 1815 (repealed)	55 Geo. 3. c. 169	11 July 1815
An act to provide for the Charge of the Addition to the Public Funded Debt of Great Britain, for the Service of the Year One thousand eight hundred and fifteen. (Repealed by Statute Law Revision Act 1861 (24 & 25 Vict. c. 101))
Agent General for Volunteers, etc. Act 1815 (repealed)	55 Geo. 3. c. 170	11 July 1815
An act to amend an Act passed in the last Session of Parliament, (Note: Office of Agent General for Volunteers, etc. Act 1814 (54 Geo. 3. c. 151)) for better regulating the Office of Agent General for Volunteers and Local Militia, and for the more effectually regulating the same. (Repealed by Paymaster General Act 1817 (57 Geo. 3. c. 41))
Inciting to Mutiny, etc. Act 1815 (repealed)	55 Geo. 3. c. 171	11 July 1815
An Act to continue for One Year certain Acts for the better Prevention and Punishment of Attempts to seduce Persons serving in His Majesty's Forces by Sea and Land from their Duty and Allegiance to His Majesty, or to incite them to Mutiny or Disobedience. (Repealed by Statute Law Revision Act 1873 (36 & 37 Vict. c. 91))
Support of Captured Slaves Act 1815 (repealed)	55 Geo. 3. c. 172	11 July 1815
An act to provide for the Support of Captured Slaves during the Period of Abjudication. (Repealed by Statute Law Revision Act 1861 (24 & 25 Vict. c. 101))
Protection of Trade Act 1815 (repealed)	55 Geo. 3. c. 173	11 July 1815
An act for the better Protection of the Trade of the United Kingdom during the present Hostilities with France. (Repealed by Statute Law Revision Act 1873 (36 & 37 Vict. c. 91))
Customs Act (No. 11) 1815 (repealed)	55 Geo. 3. c. 174	11 July 1815
An act to extend the Exemption granted by Law on Coals and Culm for which the Coast Duties have been duly paid, on being again exported and carried to any other Place in this Kingdom, to Cinders or Coked Coals burnt from Pit Coal, which has paid the Coast Duties. (Repealed by Customs Law Repeal Act 1825 (6 Geo. 4. c. 105))
Bringing of Coal to London, etc. Act 1815 (repealed)	55 Geo. 3. c. 175	11 July 1815
An act to continue until the First Day of August One thousand eight hundred and sixteen, Two Acts of the Fiftieth (Note: Bringing of Coals, etc., to London, etc. Act 1810 (50 Geo. 3. c. 110)) and Forty fifth (Note: Bringing of Coals, etc., to London, etc. Act 1805 (45 Geo. 3. c. 128)) Years of His present Majesty, allowing the bringing of Coals, Culm and Cinders to London and Westminster, by Inland Navigation. (Repealed by Statute Law Revision Act 1873 (36 & 37 Vict. c. 91))
Duty on Tiles Act 1815 (repealed)	55 Geo. 3. c. 176	11 July 1815
An act for allowing certain Tiles to be made Duty-free to serve for Draining. (Repealed by Excise (Ireland) Act 1826 (7 Geo. 4. c. 49))
Frauds in Manufacture of Sweets Act 1815 (repealed)	55 Geo. 3. c. 177	11 July 1815
An act for the further Prevention of Frauds in the Manufacture of Sweets. (Repealed by Statute Law Revision Act 1861 (24 & 25 Vict. c. 101))
Flax, etc., Manufacture (Great Britain) Act 1815 (repealed)	55 Geo. 3. c. 178	11 July 1815
An act to revive and continue, until the Twenty fifth Day of March One thousand eight hundred and twenty, an Act of the Twenty eighth Year of His present Majesty, (Note: Continuance of Laws Act 1788 (28 Geo. 3. c. 23)) for the more effectual Encouragement of the Manufacture of Flax and Cotton in Great Britain. (Repealed by Statute Law Revision Act 1873 (36 & 37 Vict. c. 91))
Salt Duty Act 1815 (repealed)	55 Geo. 3. c. 179	11 July 1815
An act to revive, amend and continue, until the Twenty fifth Day of March One thousand eight hundred and twenty one, so much of an Act of the Forty first Year of His present Majesty (Note: Use of Salt Duty Free, etc. Act 1800 (41 Geo. 3. (G.B.) c. 21)) as allows the Use of Salt, Duty-free, for curing Fish in Bulk or in Barrels; and to repeal certain Laws relating to the Allowance of Salt, Duty-free, for the North Seas and Iceland Fisheries. (Repealed by Statute Law Revision Act 1861 (24 & 25 Vict. c. 101))
Exportation Act 1815 (repealed)	55 Geo. 3. c. 180	11 July 1815
An act to revive and continue, until the Fifth Day of July One thousand eight hundred and sixteen, an Act of the Forty sixth Year of His present Majesty's Reign, (Note: Bounty on Silk Manufactures Act 1806 (46 Geo. 3. c. 110)) for granting an additional Bounty on the Exportation of the Silk Manufactures of Great Britain. (Repealed by Statute Law Revision Act 1873 (36 & 37 Vict. c. 91))
Customs Act (No. 12) 1815 (repealed)	55 Geo. 3. c. 181	11 July 1815
An act for charging an additional Duty on certain Seeds imported. (Repealed by Statute Law Revision Act 1861 (24 & 25 Vict. c. 101))
Inland Navigation (Ireland) Act 1815 (repealed)	55 Geo. 3. c. 182	11 July 1815
An act to authorize the Directors General of Inland Navigation in Ireland to proceed in carrying on and completing the Canal from Dublin to Tarmonbury on the River Shannon. (Repealed by Statute Law Revision Act 1873 (36 & 37 Vict. c. 91))
Exportation (No. 2) Act 1815 (repealed)	55 Geo. 3. c. 183	11 July 1815
An act to repeal the Bounties payable in Ireland on the Exportation of certain Calicoes and Cottons. (Repealed by Statute Law Revision Act 1873 (36 & 37 Vict. c. 91))
Stamp Act 1815	55 Geo. 3. c. 184	11 July 1815
An Act for repealing the Stamp Duties on Deeds, Law Proceedings, and other written or printed Instruments, and the Duties on Fire Insurances, and on Legacies and Successions to Personal Estate upon Intestacies, now payable in Great Britain, and for granting other Duties in lieu thereof.
Plate Duties Act 1815 (repealed)	55 Geo. 3. c. 185	11 July 1815
An act for repealing the Stamp Office Duties on Advertisements, Almanacks, Newspapers, Gold and Silver Plate, Stage Coaches and Licences for keeping Stage Coaches, now payable in Great Britain; and for granting new Duties in lieu thereof. (Repealed by Customs and Inland Revenue Act 1890 (53 & 54 Vict. c. 8))
Purchase of Estate for Duke of Wellington Act 1815 or the Annuity (Duke of Wellington) Act 1815 (repealed)	55 Geo. 3. c. 186	11 July 1815
An act for granting an additional Sum of Money for providing a suitable Residence and Estate for the Duke of Wellington and his Heirs, in Consideration of the eminent and signal Services performed by the said Duke to His Majesty and the Public. (Repealed by Wellington Estate Act 1972 (c. 1))
Appropriation Act 1815 (repealed)	55 Geo. 3. c. 187	11 July 1815
An act for granting to His Majesty certain Sums out of the respective Consolidated Funds of Great Britain and Ireland, and for applying certain Monies therein mentioned for the Service of the Year One thousand eight hundred and fifteen; and for further appropriating the Supplies granted in this Session of Parliament. (Repealed by Statute Law Revision Act 1873 (36 & 37 Vict. c. 91))
Grant of Feu Duties to John Francis Erskine Act 1815 (repealed)	55 Geo. 3. c. 188	11 July 1815
An act for enabling His Majesty to grant to John Francis Erskine of Mar Esquire, and His Heirs and Assigns, the Feu Duties and Quit Rents arising in the Lordship of Stirling, in Discharge of a Debt of greater Value created upon the said Feu Duties by a grant from His Majesty King George the First. (Repealed by Statute Law (Repeals) Act 1978 (c. 45))
Allowance of Duty to Meux and Company Act 1815 (repealed)	55 Geo. 3. c. 189	11 July 1815
An act for allowing Henry Meux, Thomas Starling Benson, Florance Thomas Young, Richard Latham and John Newberry, to brew Duty-free a Quantity of Strong Beer, the Duty on which will be equivalent to the Duty on the Beer lost, and to the Duties on the Malt and Hops expended in the Production of the Beer so lost. (Repealed by Statute Law Revision Act 1873 (36 & 37 Vict. c. 91))
Brecknock Forest Act 1815 (repealed)	55 Geo. 3. c. 190	11 July 1815
An act to amend an Act made in the Forty eighth Year of His present Majesty, (Note: Duchy of Lancaster Act 1808 (48 Geo. 3. c. 73)) to improve the Land Revenue of The Crown, so far as relates to the Great Forest of Brecknock, in the County of Brecknock; and for vesting in His Majesty certain Parts of the said Forest, and for inclosing the said Forest. (Repealed by Brecknock Forest Act 1818 (58 Geo. 3. c. 99), Crown Estate Act 1961 (9 & 10 Eliz. 2. c. 55) and Wild Creatures and Forest Laws Act 1971 (c. 47))
Dublin Harbour Act 1815 (repealed)	55 Geo. 3. c. 191	11 July 1815
An act to authorize the Appointment of Commissioners for erecting an Harbour for Ships to the Eastward of Dunleary, within the Port and Harbour of Dublin. (Repealed by Dublin Port and Docks Act 1869 (32 & 33 Vict. c. c))
Disposition of Copyhold Estates by Will Act 1815 (repealed)	55 Geo. 3. c. 192	12 July 1815
An act to remove certain Difficulties in the Disposition of Copyhold Estates by Will. (Repealed by Wills Act 1837 (7 Will. 4 & 1 Vict. c. 26))
Trade with United States Act 1815 (repealed)	55 Geo. 3. c. 193	12 July 1815
An act to enable His Majesty, until Six Weeks after the Commencement of the next Session of Parliament, to regulate the Trade and Commerce carried on between His Majesty's Subjects and the Inhabitants of the United States of America. (Repealed by Statute Law Revision Act 1873 (36 & 37 Vict. c. 91))
Apothecaries Act 1815 or the Medical Act 1815 (repealed)	55 Geo. 3. c. 194	12 July 1815
An Act for better regulating the Practice of Apothecaries throughout England and Wales. (Repealed by Statute Law (Repeals) Act 1989 (c. 43))
Government Contractors Act 1815 (repealed)	55 Geo. 3. c. 195	12 July 1815
An act for exonerating the Estates and Effects of the late Sir James Colebrooke, the late Sir George Colebrooke, Arnold Nesbit, Sir Samuel Fludyer, Adam Drummond and Moses Franks, and of their Sureties, from all Claims and Demands whatsoever in respect of any Contracts entered into with His Majesty's Government. (Repealed by Statute Law Revision Act 1950 (14 Geo. 6. c. 6))
Exchequer Bills (Great Britain) Act 1815 (repealed)	55 Geo. 3. c. 196	12 July 1815
An act for enabling His Majesty to raise the Sum of Six Millions for the Service of Great Britain. (Repealed by Statute Law Revision Act 1873 (36 & 37 Vict. c. 91))

=== Local acts ===
Short title	Citation	Royal assent
Long title
Road from Cirencester to Birdlip Hill Act 1815 (repealed)	55 Geo. 3. c. i	23 March 1815
An Act to continue the Term, and to amend and enlarge the Powers of several Acts passed for repairing the Road from Cirencester, in the County of Gloucester, to Birdlip Hill, in the said County. (Repealed by Cirencester Roads Act 1825 (6 Geo. 4. c. cxliii))
Road from Cirencester to St. John's Bridge Act 1815 (repealed)	55 Geo. 3. c. ii	23 March 1815
An Act to continue the Term and amend and enlarge the Powers of several Acts passed for repairing the Road from Cirencester to Saint John's Bridge, in the County of Gloucester, and certain other Roads therein mentioned. (Repealed by Cirencester Roads Act 1825 (6 Geo. 4. c. cxliii))
Port of London Improvement Act 1815 (repealed)	55 Geo. 3. c. iii	23 March 1815
An Act to amend the several Acts passed for making Wet Docks, Basons, Cuts and other Works, for the greater Accommodation and Security of Shipping, Commerce and Revenue, within the Port of London; and for raising a further Sum of Money for the Completion of the said Works. (Repealed by London Docks Act 1828 (9 Geo. 4. c. cxvi))
Roads from Epsom Act 1815 (repealed)	55 Geo. 3. c. iv	23 March 1815
An Act for enlarging the Term and Powers of several Acts of His late and present Majesty, for repairing the Roads from Epsom through Ewell to Tooting, and from Ewell to Kingston upon Thames, and Thames Ditton; and across Ewell Common Fields, to the Ryegate Turnpike Road on Borough Heath, all in the County of Surry. (Repealed by Road from Epsom to Tooting Act 1839 (2 & 3 Vict. c. iv))
Stockport Parish Church Act 1815	55 Geo. 3. c. v	23 March 1815
An Act for enlarging the Powers of an Act of His present Majesty, (Note: Stockport Parish Church and Cemetery Act 1810 (50 Geo. 3. c. cxlv)) for repairing or rebuilding the Parish Church of Stockport, in the County Palatine of Chester.
Wilts and Berks Canal Navigation Act 1815 (repealed)	55 Geo. 3. c. vi	23 March 1815
An Act to enable the Company of Proprietors of the Wilts and Berks Canal Navigation to raise Money for discharging the Debts of the said Company. (Repealed by Wilts and Berks Canal Navigation Act 1821 (1 & 2 Geo. 4. c. xcvii))
Basingstoke Improvement Act 1815	55 Geo. 3. c. vii	23 March 1815
An Act for paving the Footways and Crosspaths, and lighting, watching, cleansing, widening and otherwise improving the Streets, Lanes and other Public Passages and Places, in the Town of Basingstoke, in the County of Southampton.
Burtryford, Alston and Burnstones Road Act 1815 (repealed)	55 Geo. 3. c. viii	23 March 1815
An Act for enlarging the Term and Powers of an Act of His present Majesty, (Note: Burtry Ford to Burnstone Road Act 1794 (34 Geo. 3. c. 125)) for repairing the Road from Burtryford, in the County of Durham, to Alston, in the County of Cumberland, and from Alston aforesaid, by the Dyke, to Burnstones, in the County of Northumberland. (Repealed by Durham, Cumberland, Northumberland and North Yorkshire Roads and Tyne Bridges Act 1824 (5 Geo. 4. c. xxxiv))
Hereford County Offices Act 1815 (repealed)	55 Geo. 3. c. ix	23 March 1815
An Act for erecting a Shire Hall, Courts of Justice and other Buildings, for Public Purposes; and for providing suitable Accommodations for His Majesty's Justices of Assize, in and for the County of Hereford. (Repealed by Statute Law (Repeals) Act 2013 (c. 2))
Road from Stanhope to Shotley Act 1815	55 Geo. 3. c. x	23 March 1815
An Act for repairing the Road from the Town of Stanhope, by Edmondbyers, in the County of Durham, to the Corbridge Turnpike Road near Greenhead, in the Parish of Shotley, in the County of Northumberland.
Road from Dunchurch to Southam Act 1815	55 Geo. 3. c. xi	23 March 1815
An Act for enlarging the Term and Powers of an Act of His present Majesty, (Note: Dunchurch to Southam Road Act 1794 (34 Geo. 3. c. 128)) for repairing the Road from Dunchurch to Southam, in the County of Warwick.
Roads to and from Exeter Act 1815 (repealed)	55 Geo. 3. c. xii	23 March 1815
An Act for repairing and improving the Roads leading to and from the City of Exeter, and for keeping in Repair Exe Bridge and Countess Wear Bridge. (Repealed by Roads to and from Exeter Act 1826 (7 Geo. 4. c. xxv))
Road from Elland Bridge Act 1815 (repealed)	55 Geo. 3. c. xiii	23 March 1815
An Act for making and maintaining a Road from Elland Bridge, in the Parish of Halifax, to join the Dewsbury and Elland Turnpike Road, at or near to a certain Obelisk belonging to Sir George Armytage Baronet, in the Parish of Dewsbury, all in the West Riding of the County of York. (Repealed by Elland Bridge and Dewsbury Road (West Yorkshire) Act 1837 (7 Will. 4 & 1 Vict. c. xlvi))
Road from Haslingden to Todmorden Act 1815 (repealed)	55 Geo. 3. c. xiv	23 March 1815
An Act for repairing the Road from Haslingden, through New Church and Bacup, to Todmorden, and for making and maintaining several Branches therefrom, all in the County Palatine of Lancaster. (Repealed by Haslingden and Todmorden Turnpike Road Act 1857 (20 & 21 Vict. c. cxliv))
Odiham and Alton Road Act 1815 (repealed)	55 Geo. 3. c. xv	23 March 1815
An Act for enlarging the Term and Powers of an Act of His present Majesty, (Note: Odiham to Alton Road Act 1793 (33 Geo. 3. c. 182)) for repairing the Road from Odiham to Alton, in the County of Southampton. (Repealed by Basingstoke, Odiham and Alton Roads Act 1839 (2 & 3 Vict. c. xlv))
Mansfield and Chesterfield Road Act 1815	55 Geo. 3. c. xvi	23 March 1815
An Act for continuing the Term and altering and enlarging the Powers of several Acts of His late Majesty King George the Second, and of His present Majesty, for repairing and widening the Road from the Town of Mansfield, in the County of Nottingham, to the Turnpike Road leading from Derby to Chesterfield in the County of Derby.
Roads in Roxburgh Act 1815 (repealed)	55 Geo. 3. c. xvii	23 March 1815
An Act for more effectually repairing and maintaining certain Roads in the County of Roxburgh, and other Roads connected therewith, leading into the Counties of Berwick, Northumberland and Durham. (Repealed by Roads in Roxburgh Act 1837 (7 Will. 4 & 1 Vict. c. xxxix))
Woolwich Ferry Act 1815	55 Geo. 3. c. xviii	2 May 1815
An Act to amend an Act of His present Majesty, (Note: Woolwich Ferry Act 1811 (51 Geo. 3. c. cxcix)) for establishing a Ferry across the River Thames at Woolwich, in the County of Kent.
Road from Lawton to Burslem Act 1815 (repealed)	55 Geo. 3. c. xix	2 May 1815
An Act to continue the Term and alter and amend the Powers of Three Acts of His present Majesty, (Note: Lawton, Burslem and Newcastle-under-Lyme Road Act 1763 (3 Geo. 3. c. 45)) (Note: Chester and Stafford Roads Act 1783 (23 Geo. 3. c. 101)) (Note: Road from Lawton to Burslem Act 1805 (45 Geo. 3. c. lxxx)) for repairing the Road from Lawton, in the County of Chester, to Burslem and Newcastle under Lyme, in the County of Stafford, and other Roads therein mentioned; and also to make a new Road from Burslem aforesaid to Cobridge, and a Branch therefrom to Burslem Church. (Repealed by Lawton, Burslem and Newcastle-Under-Lyme Turnpike Roads Act 1859 (22 & 23 Vict. c. lxxxvii))
Hungerford Parish Church Repairing and Enlarging Act 1815	55 Geo. 3. c. xx	2 May 1815
An Act for enlarging the Powers of an Act of His present Majesty, (Note: Hungerford Parish Church Act 1811 (51 Geo. 3. c. cxxvi)) for repairing, enlarging, and improving the Parish Church of Hungerford, in the Counties of Berks and Wilts.
St. John's Church, Wakefield Act 1815	55 Geo. 3. c. xxi	2 May 1815
An Act to amend an Act of His present Majesty, (Note: Wakefield Church Act 1791 (31 Geo. 3. c. 74)) for building a new Church at Wakefield, in the West Riding of the County of York.
Preston Improvement and Fire Protection Act 1815 (repealed)	55 Geo. 3. c. xxii	2 May 1815
An Act to light, watch, pave, cleanse and improve the Streets, Highways and Places within the Borough of Preston, in the County Palatine of Lancaster; and to provide Fire Engines and Firemen for the Protection of the said Borough. (Repealed by County of Lancashire Act 1984 (c. xxi))
New Sarum Improvement Act 1815	55 Geo. 3. c. xxiii	2 May 1815
An Act to alter, extend and amend the Powers of Two Acts, passed in the Tenth Year of the Reign of His late Majesty King George the Second, (Note: New Sarum Improvement Act 1736 (10 Geo. 2. c. 6)) and in the Twelfth Year of the Reign of His present Majesty, (Note: Wiltshire Roads Act 1772 (12 Geo. 3. c. 74)) for better paving, lighting and watching the City of New Sarum, in the County of Wilts.
Abergavenny Improvement Act 1815 (repealed)	55 Geo. 3. c. xxiv	2 May 1815
An Act to amend an Act of His present Majesty, (Note: Abergavenny Improvement Act 1794 (34 Geo. 3. c. 106)) for paving and otherwise improving the Town of Abergavenny, in the County of Monmouth. (Repealed by Abergavenny Improvement Act 1854 (17 & 18 Vict. c. xlix))
St. Pancras Improvement Act 1815 (repealed)	55 Geo. 3. c. xxv	2 May 1815
An Act for amending Two Acts of His present Majesty, (Note: St. Pancras Improvement Act 1801 (41 Geo. 3. (U.K.) c. cxxxi)) (Note: St. Pancras Improvement Act 1803 (43 Geo. 3. c. cxxxix)) for improving certain Plots of Ground belonging to the Right Honourable Ann Dowager Baroness Southampton, and other Persons, in the Parish of Saint Pancras, in the County of Middlesex. (Repealed by London Government (Borough of St. Pancras) Order in Council 1901 (SR&O 1901/274))
Ipswich Improvement Act 1815 (repealed)	55 Geo. 3. c. xxvi	2 May 1815
An Act for amending and enlarging the Powers of Two Acts of His present Majesty, (Note: Ipswich Improvement Act 1793 (33 Geo. 3. c. 92)) (Note: Ipswich Improvement Act 1797 (37 Geo. 3. c. 44)) for paving, lighting, cleansing, and improving the Town of Ipswich, in the County of Suffolk, and removing and preventing Encroachments, Obstructions and Annoyances therein; and for Watching the said Town. (Repealed by Ipswich Improvement Act 1837 (7 Will. 4 & 1 Vict. c. lxxiii))
Lichfield Inclosures, Improvement and Water Supply Act 1815	55 Geo. 3. c. xxvii	2 May 1815
An Act for dividing, inclosing and selling the Waste Lands, and Lammas and other Commonable Rights, in the City and County of the City of Lichfield; to explain and amend an Act of His present Majesty, (Note: City of Lichfield Improvement Act 1806 (46 Geo. 3. c. xlii)) for paving, cleansing, lighting, watching and regulating the Streets, Lanes and other Public Places, within the City of Lichfield, and the Suburbs thereof; and for better supplying the said City with Water.
Clifton Dartmouth Hardness Market and Improvement Act 1815	55 Geo. 3. c. xxviii	2 May 1815
An Act for building a Market House in the Borough of Clifton Dartmouth Hardness, in the County of Devon; and for better paving, lighting, widening and improving the Streets and other Public Places within the said Borough.
Lichfield Bridge Rebuilding Act 1815 (repealed)	55 Geo. 3. c. xxix	2 May 1815
An Act to rebuild the Bridge in Bird Street, otherwise Bridge Street, in the City of Lichfield. (Repealed by Staffordshire Act 1983 (c. xviii))
Tempsford Bridge (Bedford) Rebuilding Act 1815 (repealed)	55 Geo. 3. c. xxx	2 May 1815
An Act for rebuilding Tempsford Bridge, in the County of Bedford. (Repealed by Statute Law (Repeals) Act 1995 (c. 44))
Perth County Offices Act 1815 (repealed)	55 Geo. 3. c. xxxi	2 May 1815
An Act to alter and amend an Act of the Forty seventh Year of the Reign of His present Majesty, (Note: Perth County Offices Act 1807 (47 Geo. 3 Sess. 2. c. iv)) for erecting a County Hall and other Offices for the County of Perth. (Repealed by Perth County Buildings Order Confirmation Act 1927 (17 & 18 Geo. 5. c. cxx))
Mytholmroyd Bridge Turnpike Road Act 1815 (repealed)	55 Geo. 3. c. xxxii	2 May 1815
An Act for making and maintaining a Turnpike Road from or near Mytholm Royd Bridge, in the West Riding of the County of York, to communicate with the Road at or near the Sixth Milestone from Rochdale, in the County of Lancaster. (Repealed by Mytholmroyd Bridge and Rochdale Turnpike Road Act 1832 (2 & 3 Will. 4. c. xix))
Road from Cow-Cawsey to Buckton Burn Act 1815 (repealed)	55 Geo. 3. c. xxxiii	2 May 1815
An Act for enlarging and altering the Term and Powers of an Act of His present Majesty, (Note: Newcastle to Buckton Burn Road Act 1794 (34 Geo. 3. c. 130)) for repairing the Road leading from the Cow Cawsey, near the Town of Newcastle upon Tyne, to the Town of Belford, and from thence to Buckton Burn, in the County of Northumberland. (Repealed by Cow-Cawsey, Belford and Buckton Burn Turnpike Road (Northumberland) Act 1836 (6 & 7 Will. 4. c. lxxxiii))
Stirling, Dumbarton and Perth Roads Act 1815	55 Geo. 3. c. xxxiv	2 May 1815
An Act for more effectually repairing the Road from Stirling to Dumbarton, and several other Roads in the Counties of Stirling, Dumbarton and Perth.
Road from Royston to Wandesford Bridge Act 1815	55 Geo. 3. c. xxxv	2 May 1815
An Act for more effectually repairing the Road leading from Royston, in the County of Hertford, to Wandesford Bridge, and from the Town of Huntingdon to Somersham in the County of Huntingdon, so far as respects the Middle Division and separate District of the said Roads.
Rochdale to Halifax and Ealand Road Act 1815 (repealed)	55 Geo. 3. c. xxxvi	2 May 1815
An Act for enlarging the Term and Powers of Two Acts of King George the Second, (Note: Rochdale, Halifax and Ealand Road Act 1734 (8 Geo. 2. c. 7)) (Note: Lancaster and Yorkshire Roads Act 1754 (27 Geo. 2. c. 37)) and Two Acts of His present Majesty, (Note: Lancaster and Yorks Roads Act 1766 (6 Geo. 3. c. 90)) (Note: Rochdale Road Act 1795 (35 Geo. 3. c. 160)) for repairing and widening the Road from Rochdale, in the County Palatine of Lancaster, to Halifax and Ealand, in the West Riding of the County of York. (Repealed by Rochdale, Halifax and Ealand Road Act 1836 (6 & 7 Will. 4. c. viii))
Heronsyke, Kendal and Eamont Bridge Road Act 1815	55 Geo. 3. c. xxxvii	2 May 1815
An Act for more effectually repairing the Road leading from Heron Syke to Kirkby in Kendal, and from thence through Shap to Eamont Bridge, in the County of Westmorland; and for making a new Road from the said Road, at a Place called Far Cross Bank, near Kirkby in Kendal, to communicate with the intended Canal from Lancaster to Kirkby in Kendal, and to join the said Road at or near a Place called The Lound, near Kirkby in Kendal aforesaid.
Witney and Clanfield Road Act 1815 (repealed)	55 Geo. 3. c. xxxviii	2 May 1815
An Act to continue the Term and alter and enlarge the Powers of Two Acts of His present Majesty, (Note: Oxford Roads Act 1771 (11 Geo. 3. c. 73)) (Note: Witney to Clanfield Road Act 1793 (33 Geo. 3. c. 137)) for amending the Road from the Bottom of Galley Hill to the Cross in Clanfield, in the County of Oxford. (Repealed by Statute Law (Repeals) Act 2013 (c. 2))
Stratford-upon-Avon Canal Navigation Act 1815	55 Geo. 3. c. xxxix	12 May 1815
An Act to amend several Acts of His present Majesty, for making the Stratford upon Avon Canal Navigation.
Birmingham Canal Navigations and Worcester and Birmingham Canal Navigable Communication Act 1815 (repealed)	55 Geo. 3. c. xl	12 May 1815
An Act for establishing a Navigable Communication between the Birmingham Canal Navigations and the Worcester and Birmingham Canal, and amending certain Acts passed relative thereto. (Repealed by Birmingham Canal Navigations Act 1835 (5 & 6 Will. 4. c. xxxiv))
Gloucester and Cheltenham Railway Act 1815 (repealed)	55 Geo. 3. c. xli	12 May 1815
An Act for enabling the Gloucester and Cheltenham Railway Company to raise a further Sum of Money for the Completion of their Works. (Repealed by Gloucester and Cheltenham Tramroads Abandonment Act 1859 (22 & 23 Vict. c. xl))
Leeds Court House, Prison and Police Act 1815 (repealed)	55 Geo. 3. c. xlii	12 May 1815
An Act to amend and enlarge the Powers and Provisions of an Act of His present Majesty, (Note: Leeds Improvement Act 1809 (49 Geo. 3. c. cxxii)) for erecting a Court House and Prison for the Borough of Leeds, in the County of York, and other Purposes; to provide for the Expence of the Prosecution of Felons in certain Cases; and to establish a Police and Nightly Watch in the Town, Borough and Neighbourhood of Leeds aforesaid. (Repealed by West Yorkshire Act 1980 (c. xiv))
Andover Improvement Act 1815	55 Geo. 3. c. xliii	12 May 1815
An Act for paving the Foot Ways and Cross Paths, and lighting, watching, cleansing and improving the Streets, Lanes and other Public Passages and Places, in the Borough or Town of Andevor, in the County of Southampton.
St. Thomas, Dudley, Parish Church Act 1815	55 Geo. 3. c. xliv	12 May 1815
An Act for taking down and rebuilding the Parish Church of Saint Thomas, in the Town of Dudley, in the County of Worcester.
Surrey County Public Records Office Act 1815 (repealed)	55 Geo. 3. c. xlv	12 May 1815
An Act to enable the Justices of the Peace for the County of Surry to provide a proper Place for the depositing and preserving the Public Records of the said County, together with a Residence for the Clerk of the Peace, for the safe Custody of such Records, and convenient Offices for transacting his Business; and also to settle a Table of Fees to be taken by such Clerk of the Peace. (Repealed by Surrey County Offices Act 1871 (34 & 35 Vict. c. clix))
Union Society and Union Life Office Act 1815	55 Geo. 3. c. xlvi	12 May 1815
An Act to enable the Union Society for effecting Insurance from Fire, and the Union Life Office for effecting Insurances on Lives and Survivorships, and for granting and purchasing Annuities, to sue and be sued in the Name of the Chairman or Secretary for the time being.
Feock and Flushing Road Act 1815	55 Geo. 3. c. xlvii	12 May 1815
An Act for making and maintaining a Public Road from or near Killaganoon Corner, in the Parish of Feock, in the County of Cornwall, to the Village of Flushing, in the Parish of Mylor, in the same County.
Sutton (Surrey), Reigate and Povey Cross Road Act 1815 (repealed)	55 Geo. 3. c. xlviii	12 May 1815
An Act for repairing the Road from Sutton, in the County of Surry, through the Borough of Reigate, by Sidlow Mill to Povey Cross, and several other Roads therein mentioned, in the same County. (Repealed by Statute Law (Repeals) Act 2013 (c. 2))
Cambridge to Newmarket Heath Road Act 1815	55 Geo. 3. c. xlix	12 May 1815
An Act for more effectually repairing the Road from Jesus Lane in the Town of Cambridge, to Newmarket Heath, in the County of Cambridge.
Highgate and South Mimms Road Act 1815 (repealed)	55 Geo. 3. c. l	12 May 1815
An Act for more effectually repairing the Road from Highgate Gate House, in the County of Middlesex, to the Thirteen Mile-stone near Gannick Corner, in the Parish of South Mims, in the said County. (Repealed by Highgate, Chipping Barnet and South Mimms Road Act 1830 (1 Will. 4. c. i))
Road from Keighley to Bradford Act 1815	55 Geo. 3. c. li	12 May 1815
An Act for amending the Road from Keighley to Bradford, and for making and maintaining a Branch therefrom all in the West Riding of the County of York.
Launceston Roads Act 1815 (repealed)	55 Geo. 3. c. lii	12 May 1815
An Act for continuing and amending Three Acts, (Note: Launceston Roads Act 1759 (33 Geo. 2. c. 59)) (Note: Launceston Roads Act 1781 (21 Geo. 3. c. 86)) (Note: Launceston (Cornwall) Roads Act 1801 (41 Geo. 3. (U.K.) c. x)) for repairing several Roads in the Counties of Devon and Cornwall, leading to the Borough of Launceston. (Repealed by Launceston Turnpike Roads Act 1835 (5 & 6 Will. 4. c. lxv))
Road from Lanfabon to Abernant Act 1815 (repealed)	55 Geo. 3. c. liii	12 May 1815
An Act to continue and amend an Act of His present Majesty, (Note: Glamorgan Roads Act 1793 (33 Geo. 3. c. 133)) for opening and making a new Road from the Turnpike Road at Craig Evan Leyson, in the Parish of Lanvabon, to the Confines of the Parish of Ystradyvoduck, near Abernant, in the County of Glamorgan. (Repealed by Turnpike Trusts in South Wales Act 1844 (7 & 8 Vict. c. 91))
Roads from Uttoxeter and from Millwich Act 1815 (repealed)	55 Geo. 3. c. liv	12 May 1815
An Act for continuing and amending an Act of His present Majesty, (Note: Uttoxeter to Stoke Road Act 1793 (33 Geo. 3. c. 131)) for repairing the Roads from Uttoxeter to Stoke, near Stone, and from Millwich to Sandon, in the County of Stafford. (Repealed by Uttoxeter and Stoke near Stone, Millwich and Sandon Turnpike Roads Act 1851 (14 & 15 Vict. c. lx))
Pocklington Canal Act 1815	55 Geo. 3. c. lv	25 May 1815
An Act for making and maintaining a navigable Canal from the River Derwent at East Cottingwith, in the East Riding of the County of York, to the Turnpike Road leading from the City of York to the Town of Kingston upon Hull, at a certain Place there called Street Bridge, in the Township of Pocklington, in the said Riding.
Perth Gaol Act 1815	55 Geo. 3. c. lvi	25 May 1815
An Act to amend an Act of the Fifty third Year of His present Majesty, (Note: Perth Gaol Act 1813 (53 Geo. 3. c. cxvii)) for erecting and maintaining a new Gaol for the County and City of Perth; and for other Purposes relating thereto.
St. Helen, Abingdon, Burial Ground Act 1815	55 Geo. 3. c. lvii	25 May 1815
An Act for enlarging the Church Yard and providing additional Burying Ground for the Parish of Saint Helen, in Abingdon, in the County of Berks.
Kentish Town Improvement Act 1815 (repealed)	55 Geo. 3. c. lviii	25 May 1815
An Act for paving or gravelling, watching and lighting certain Places situate on the West Side of the Turnpike Road in Kentish Town, in the Parish of Saint Pancras, in the County of Middlesex, and for preventing Nuisances and Obstructions therein. (Repealed by London Government (Borough of St. Pancras) Order in Council 1901 (SR&O 1901/274))
Roads from Stones End and from Newington Green Act 1815 (repealed)	55 Geo. 3. c. lix	25 May 1815
An Act to repeal an Act of His present Majesty, (Note: Middlesex Roads Act 1789 (29 Geo. 3. c. 96)) for repairing the Roads from the Stones End, in the Parish of Saint Leonard Shoreditch, to the Northern Road, in the Parish of Enfield, and from the Place where the Watchhouse in Edmonton formerly stood to the Market Place in Enfield, and from Newington Green to Bush Hill, and for the several other Purposes therein mentioned; and to provide for more effectually repairing the said Roads, and for lighting, watching and watering several Parts thereof. (Repealed by Metropolis Roads Act 1826 (7 Geo. 4. c. cxlii))
Roads to Chard Act 1815 (repealed)	55 Geo. 3. c. lx	25 May 1815
An Act for repealing an Act of His present Majesty, (Note: Dorset, Devon and Somerset Roads Act 1800 (39 & 40 Geo. 3. c. lxi)) for the Repair of several Roads in the Counties of Somerset, Devon and Dorset, leading to the Town of Chard in the County of Somerset, and for making and repairing a Road from Chard to the Honiton Turnpike Road, in the Parish of Uppottery, in the County of Devon, and for more effectually repairing the Residue of the Roads comprised in the said Act. (Repealed by Chard Roads (Somerset) Act 1829 (10 Geo. 4. c. xciii))
Ross (Hereford) Roads Act 1815 (repealed)	55 Geo. 3. c. lxi	25 May 1815
An Act for more effectually repairing the Roads leading into and through the Town of Ross, in the County of Hereford, and several Roads communicating therewith. (Repealed by Ross Turnpike Roads Act 1862 (25 & 26 Vict. c. iv))
Roads from Fisherton, Wilton and Heytesbury Act 1815	55 Geo. 3. c. lxii	25 May 1815
An Act for enlarging the Term and Powers of Four Acts of His present Majesty, for repairing several Roads leading from Fisherton, Wilton, Heytesbury and other Places in the County of Wilts, and for diverting the Line of Part of the said Roads.
Roads from Ticknall Act 1815 (repealed)	55 Geo. 3. c. lxiii	25 May 1815
An Act for continuing the Term, and altering and enlarging the Powers, of an Act of His present Majesty, (Note: Roads from Ticknall Act 1794 (34 Geo. 3. c. 120)) for repairing the Roads from Scaddow Gate, in the Parish of Ticknall, to the Burton upon Trent and Ashby de la Zouch Turnpike Road, and certain Roads therein mentioned, and to make and maintain other Roads to communicate therewith. (Repealed by Roads from Ticknall (Derbyshire, Leicestershire) Act 1834 (4 & 5 Will. 4. c. lx))
High Court of Chancery Act 1815 (repealed)	55 Geo. 3. c. lxiv	7 June 1815
An Act for making further Provision for the Secretary and Usher to the Vice Chancellor of England, and for the Clerks in the Office of the Accountant General of the High Court of Chancery, and for providing additional Clerks for the said Office. (Repealed by Court of Chancery (Funds) Act 1872 (35 & 36 Vict. c. 44))
Sheffield Canal Act 1815	55 Geo. 3. c. lxv	7 June 1815
An Act for making and maintaining a Navigable Canal from Sheffield to Tinsley, in the West Riding of the County of York.
Worcester and Birmingham Canal Navigation Act 1815	55 Geo. 3. c. lxvi	7 June 1815
An Act for enabling the Company of Proprietors of the Worcester and Birmingham Canal Navigation to complete and extend their Works, and for better supplying the said Canal with Water; and also for vesting in Trustees for the said Company of Proprietors, His Majesty's Right and Interest in certain Lands and Hereditaments in the Parishes of King's Norton and Northfield, in the County of Worcester, forfeited to The Crown.
Isle of Man and Calf of Man Lighthouses Act 1815 (repealed)	55 Geo. 3. c. lxvii	7 June 1815
An Act for enabling the Commissioners of the Northern Light Houses to erect Light Houses on the Isles of Man and Calf of Man. (Repealed by Merchant Shipping Repeal Act 1854 (17 & 18 Vict. c. 120))
St. Katherine, Middlesex, Improvement Act 1815	55 Geo. 3. c. lxviii	7 June 1815
An Act to amend an Act of His present Majesty, (Note: St. Katherine's Precinct Improvement Act 1814 (54 Geo. 3. c. ccxx)) for paving, cleansing, lighting, watching and regulating the Streets and Public Places within Part of the Precinct of Saint Katherine, in the County of Middlesex.
Melcombe Regis Parish Church Rebuilding Act 1815	55 Geo. 3. c. lxix	7 June 1815
An Act for taking down and rebuilding the Parish Church of Melcombe Regis, in the County of Dorset.
St. Michael Toxteth Park Church Act 1815	55 Geo. 3. c. lxx	7 June 1815
An Act for establishing a Church or Chapel in Toxteth Park, in the Parish of Walton on the Hill, in the County of Lancaster.
York (Ouse Bridge) Act 1815	55 Geo. 3. c. lxxi	7 June 1815
An Act for amending and enlarging the Powers and Provisions of Two Acts of His present Majesty, (Note: York Ouse and Foss Bridges Act 1809 (49 Geo. 3. c. cxxvi)) (Note: York, Ouse and Foss Bridges Act 1810 (50 Geo. 3. c. lxxxvi)) for widening, altering and rebuilding Ouse Bridge, in the City of York, and for widening certain Streets, and making other Improvements in the said City.
New Ross Bridge Act 1815	55 Geo. 3. c. lxxii	7 June 1815
An Act to amend an Act of His present Majesty, (Note: New Ross Bridge Act 1795 (35 Geo. 3. c. 48 (I))) for erecting a Bridge over the River of Ross, at the Town of New Ross, in the County of Wexford.
Paisley and Renfrewshire Bridewell, Gaol, Courthouse and Public Offices Act 1815	55 Geo. 3. c. lxxiii	7 June 1815
An Act for erecting and maintaining a Bridewell, Gaol, Court House and Public Offices, for the Burgh of Paisley and County of Renfrew.
Roads from Wombourne and Gospel End (Staffordshire) Act 1815 (repealed)	55 Geo. 3. c. lxxiv	7 June 1815
An Act for enlarging the Term and Powers of an Act of His present Majesty, (Note: Stafford Roads (No. 2) Act 1793 (33 Geo. 3. c. 167)) for repairing the Roads from Womborne to Princes End, and from Gospel End to the Village of Over Penn, and thence to the Turnpike Road leading from Wolverhampton to Stourbridge, and other Roads therein mentioned, in the County of Stafford. (Repealed by Sedgley Roads (Staffordshire) Act 1841 (4 & 5 Vict. c. ciii))
Road from Buckingham to Newport Pagnell Act 1815 (repealed)	55 Geo. 3. c. lxxv	7 June 1815
An Act for repairing the Road from the Town of Buckingham to the Turnpike Road in the Hamlet of Old Stratford, and to be continued from the same Turnpike Road at the Town of Stony Stratford to the Town of Newport Pagnell, in the County of Bucks. (Repealed by Road from Buckingham to Newport Pagnell Act 1836 (6 & 7 Will. 4. c. ix))
Southwark and Deptford Road and Bermondsey Improvement Act 1815	55 Geo. 3. c. lxxvi	7 June 1815
An Act for amending and enlarging the Powers of an Act of His present Majesty, (Note: Southwark and Bermondsey Roads Act 1803 (43 Geo. 3. c. cxxxii)) for repairing the Road from Southwark to Deptford, and other Roads therein mentioned, and for lighting, watching and cleansing certain Parts thereof, and other Places in the Parish of Bermondsey, in the County of Surrey.
Dundalk and Dunleer Road Act 1815 (repealed)	55 Geo. 3. c. lxxvii	7 June 1815
An Act to continue and amend Two Acts of His present Majesty, (Note: Dundalk to Dunleer Road Act 1773 (13 & 14 Geo. 3. c. 30 (I))) (Note: Dundalk to Dunleer Road Act 1775 (15 & 16 Geo. 3. c. 6 (I))) for amending the Road from Dundalk (Note: Dundalk, County Louth.) to Dunleer, (Note: Dunleer, County Louth.) in the County of Louth. (Repealed by Dundalk and Dunleer Road Act 1838 (1 & 2 Vict. c. lxxiv))
Caledonian Asylum Act 1815	55 Geo. 3. c. lxxviii	14 June 1815
An Act for establishing and well governing the Charitable Institution called The Caledonian Asylum, for supporting and educating Children of Soldiers, Sailors and Marines, Natives of Scotland, and of indigent Scotch Parents resident in London, not entitled to Parochial Relief.
Hanworth Parish Church Act 1815	55 Geo. 3. c. lxxix	14 June 1815
An Act for defraying the Expence incurred in rebuilding the Parish Church of Hanworth, in the County of Middlesex.
Rochdale Chapel of Ease Act 1815	55 Geo. 3. c. lxxx	14 June 1815
An Act for building a Chapel of Ease in the Town of Rochdale, in the County Palatine of Lancaster.
Meath Hospital and County of Dublin Infirmary Act 1815 (repealed)	55 Geo. 3. c. lxxxi	14 June 1815
An Act to amend several Acts for the Management and Direction of the Meath Hospital, or County of Dublin Infirmary, and for the better regulating the same. (Repealed by Statute Law (Repeals) Act 2013 (c. 2))
Cork Grand Jury Act 1815	55 Geo. 3. c. lxxxii	22 June 1815
An Act to explain and amend an Act of His present Majesty, (Note: Cork City and County Rates Act 1813 (53 Geo. 3. c. cxi)) for the more equal Assessment of Money presented to be raised by the Grand Jury of the County of the City of Cork, and for a new Valuation of the said City and Survey of the Liberties thereof, and for other Purposes relative to Grand Juries.
Montgomeryshire Canal Act 1815	55 Geo. 3. c. lxxxiii	22 June 1815
An Act to authorize the raising of a further Sum of Money to complete the Montgomeryshire Canal, and to extend the Power of deviating from, and making certain Alterations in Part of the original Plan, and for explaining and rendering more effectual an Act of the Thirty fourth Year of His present Majesty (Note: Montgomeryshire Canal Act 1794 (34 Geo. 3. c. 39)) for making the said Canal.
Ramsgate Harbour Act 1815	55 Geo. 3. c. lxxxiv	22 June 1815
An Act to alter and amend Two Acts made in the Thirty second (Note: Ramsgate Harbour and Sandwich Act 1792 (32 Geo. 3. c. 74)) and Thirty seventh (Note: Ramsgate Harbour Act 1797 (37 Geo. 3. c. 86)) Years of His present Majesty, for the Support and Maintenance of Ramsgate Harbour, in the County of Kent.
Bodmin Market Act 1815	55 Geo. 3. c. lxxxv	22 June 1815
An Act for providing a Market for the Borough of Bodmin, in the County of Cornwall.
Benington Inclosure Act 1815	55 Geo. 3. c. lxxxvi	22 June 1815
An Act for embanking and inclosing Lands in the Parish of Benington, in the County of Lincoln.
Warminster Roads Act 1815 (repealed)	55 Geo. 3. c. lxxxvii	22 June 1815
An Act for more effectually repairing the Roads in and leading through and from the Town of Warminster, in the County of Wilts. (Repealed by Warminster Roads Act 1840 (3 & 4 Vict. c. xxi))
Mansfield and Chesterfield Road Act Amendment Act 1815	55 Geo. 3. c. lxxxviii	22 June 1815
An Act to rectify a Mistake in an Act of this Session of Parliament, (Note: Mansfield and Chesterfield Road Act 1815 (55 Geo. 3. c. xvi)) for continuing and amending several Acts for repairing the Road from Mansfield, in the County of Nottingham, to the Turnpike Road leading from Derby to Chesterfield, in the County of Derby.
Roads communicating with the West and East India Docks Act 1815 (repealed)	55 Geo. 3. c. lxxxix	22 June 1815
An Act for enlarging the Term and Powers of several Acts of His present Majesty, for making and maintaining the Roads communicating with the West and East India Docks, and for repairing the Cannon Street Road, and for making and maintaining a new Road to Barking, and a Road from the Romford and Whitechapel Road to Tilbury Fort, in the Counties of Middlesex and Essex, and also for making a new Branch of Road from King David Lane, Shadwell, to the Essex Road at Mile End, in the County of Middlesex. (Repealed by Commercial and East India and Barking Roads Act 1828 (9 Geo. 4. c. cxii))
Road from Shenfield to Harwich Act 1815 (repealed)	55 Geo. 3. c. xc	22 June 1815
An Act for continuing and amending an Act of His present Majesty, (Note: Essex Roads Act 1793 (33 Geo. 3. c. 145)) for repairing several Roads leading from Shenfield to Harwich and Rochford, and other Places in the County of Essex, and for extending the said Act to the Road from Great Hallingbury to Hockerill, in the County of Hertford. (Repealed by Statute Law (Repeals) Act 2008 (c. 12))
City of London and Westminster Streets and Post Office Act 1815	55 Geo. 3. c. xci	28 June 1815
An Act for enlarging and improving the West End of Cheapside, in the City of London, also Saint Martin's le Grand, Aldersgate Street, Saint Anne's Lane and Foster Lane, and for providing a Site for a new Post Office between Saint Martin's le Grand and Foster Lane aforesaid.
Norfolk Drainage (Wormegay, &c.) Act 1815 (repealed)	55 Geo. 3. c. xcii	28 June 1815
An Act for draining and improving certain Fen Lands, Low Grounds and Marshes, and other Lands and Grounds lying in the Parishes of Wormegay, Shouldham, Marham, Middleton, Pentney, East Winch and West Bilney, in the County of Norfolk. (Repealed by Nar Valley Drainage Act 1881 (44 & 45 Vict. c. clxxix))
City of London Courts of Justice Act 1815 (repealed)	55 Geo. 3. c. xciii	28 June 1815
An Act to enable the Mayor and Commonalty and Citizens of the City of London, to provide convenient Courts of Justice in and for the said City. (Repealed by Statute Law (Repeals) Act 2013 (c. 2))
Folly Bridge, Oxford, Rebuilding Act 1815	55 Geo. 3. c. xciv	28 June 1815
An Act for taking down and rebuilding the Whole or Part of a certain Bridge across the River Isis, in or near the City of Oxford, called Folly Bridge, otherwise Friar's Bridge, and for widening the same Bridge and improving the Approaches thereto.
Speenhamland and Puntfield Road Act 1815	55 Geo. 3. c. xcv	28 June 1815
An Act to continue the Term and amend and enlarge the Powers of Two Acts (Note: Berkshire Roads Act 1771 (11 Geo. 3. c. 70)) (Note: Berkshire Roads Act 1794 (34 Geo. 3. c. 132)) passed for repairing the Road from Reading (Note: The Black Bear Inn, which stood at the corner of Castle Street and Bridge Street in Reading. 51°27′13″N 0°58′26″W) to Speenhamland and Puntfield, (Note: Puntfield was located near the Spring Inn, on the A4 at the junction with Sulhamstead Hill, west of Theale. 51°25′21″N 1°06′20″W) in the County of Berks, and other Roads in the said County.
Bathwick Parish Church and Workhouse Act 1815 (repealed)	55 Geo. 3. c. xcvi	29 June 1815
An Act for building a new Church, and also a Workhouse, in the Parish of Bathwick, in the County of Somerset. (Repealed by Bathwick Church and Workhouse Act 1847 (10 & 11 Vict. c. ccl))
Dundee Harbour Act 1815 (repealed)	55 Geo. 3. c. xcvii	4 July 1815
An Act for improving the Harbour of Dundee, in the County of Forfar. (Repealed by Dundee Harbour Act 1830 (11 Geo. 4 & 1 Will. 4. c. cxix))
Debtors Prison for London and Middlesex Act 1815 (repealed)	55 Geo. 3. c. xcviii	4 July 1815
An Act to amend an Act of His present Majesty, (Note: Debtors' Prison for London and Middlesex Act 1812 (52 Geo. 3. c. ccix)) for building a new Prison in the City of London, (Note: Whitecross Street Prison.) and for removing thereto Prisoners confined under Civil Process in the Gaol of Newgate (Note: Newgate Prison.) and the Two Compters of the said City, and also the Prison of Ludgate. (Repealed by Statute Law (Repeals) Act 2008 (c. 12))
London Bread Trade Act 1815 (repealed)	55 Geo. 3. c. xcix	12 July 1815
An Act to repeal the Acts now in force relating to Bread to be sold in the City of London and Liberties thereof, and within the Weekly Bills of Mortality, and Ten Miles of the Royal Exchange; and to prevent the Adulteration of Meal, Flour and Bread, and to regulate the Weights of Bread within the same Limits. (Repealed by London Bread Trade Act 1822 (3 Geo. 4. c. cvi))
Otmoor Drainage and Allotments Act 1815	55 Geo. 3. c. c	12 July 1815
An Act for draining and allotting Otmoor, in the County of Oxford.

=== Private acts ===
Short title	Citation	Royal assent
Long title
Amersham Inclosure Act 1815	55 Geo. 3. c. 1 Pr.	23 March 1815
An Act for enclosing Lands in the Parish of Agmondesham otherwise Amersham in the Counties of Buckingham and Hertford.
Headon-cum-Upton Inclosure Act 1815	55 Geo. 3. c. 2 Pr.	23 March 1815
An Act for inclosing Lands within the Parish of Headon cum Upton, in the County of Nottingham.
Heydon Inclosure Act 1815	55 Geo. 3. c. 3 Pr.	23 March 1815
An Act for allotting Lands in the Parsh of Heydon, in the County of Essex.
Smallburgh Inclosure Act 1815	55 Geo. 3. c. 4 Pr.	23 March 1815
An Act for inclosing Lands in the Parish of Smallburgh, in the County of Norfolk.
Hawley Inclosure Act 1815	55 Geo. 3. c. 5 Pr.	23 March 1815
An Act for inclosing Lands within the Tithing of Hawley, in the Parish of Yately, in the County of Southampton.
Warcop Inclosure Act 1815	55 Geo. 3. c. 6 Pr.	2 May 1815
An Act for inclosing Lands in the Manor and Township of Warcop, in the County of Westmorland.
Stoke-next-Nayland, &c. Inclosure Act 1815	55 Geo. 3. c. 7 Pr.	2 May 1815
An Act for inclosing Lands in the Parishes of Stoke next Nayland, Nayland, Wiston otherwise Wissington, Assington and Polstead in the County of Suffolk.
Dundry Inclosure Act 1815	55 Geo. 3. c. 8 Pr.	2 May 1815
An Act for inclosing Lands in the Parish of Dundry in the County of Somerset.
Manby Inclosure Act 1815	55 Geo. 3. c. 9 Pr.	2 May 1815
An Act for inclosing Lands within the Parish of Manby in the County of Lincoln.
Caton Inclosure Act 1815	55 Geo. 3. c. 10 Pr.	2 May 1815
An Act for inclosing divers Tracts or Parcels of Moor, Common or Waste Grounds within the Manor and Township of Caton, in the Parish of Lancaster, in the County Palatine of Lancaster.
Redgrave, &c. Inclosure Act 1815	55 Geo. 3. c. 11 Pr.	2 May 1815
An Act for inclosing Lands in the Parish of Redgrave and Hamlet of Botesdale, in the County of Suffolk.
Rickinghall, &c. Inclosure Act 1815	55 Geo. 3. c. 12 Pr.	2 May 1815
An Act for inclosing Lands in the Parishes of Rickinghall Superior, Rickinghall Inferior and Hindercley, in the County of Suffolk.
Weston Market Inclosure Act 1815	55 Geo. 3. c. 13 Pr.	2 May 1815
An Act for inclosing Lands in the Parish of Weston Market in the County of Suffolk.
Silcock's Estate Act 1815	55 Geo. 3. c. 14 Pr.	12 May 1815
An Act for vesting Part of the Residuary Estate of Hannah Silcock Widow, deceased, in Trustees, upon Trust to sell and dispose of the same; and to lay out the Money arising therefrom in the Purchase of other Hereditaments, to be settled in lieu thereof to the same Uses.
Joye's Estate Act 1815	55 Geo. 3. c. 15 Pr.	12 May 1815
An Act for vesting the Fee Simple of certain Pieces or Parcels of Ground, Messuages and other Hereditaments, situate in the Parish of Saint Mary le Strand otherwise Strand otherwise Savoy, formerly the Estate of James Joye Esquire, deceased, in Trustees, upon the Trusts in an Indenture of Release of the Twentieth Day of December One thousand seven hundred and thirty five, declared concerning the same Hereditaments.
Burton-in-Kendal Inclosure Act 1815	55 Geo. 3. c. 16 Pr.	12 May 1815
An Act for inclosing divers Tracts or Parcels of Moor, Common or Waste Grounds, within the Parish of Burton in Kendal, in the several Counties of Westmorland and Lancaster; and for converting the same into Stinted Pasture.
Bishops Cannings Inclosure Act 1815	55 Geo. 3. c. 17 Pr.	12 May 1815
An Act for dividing and allotting certain Lands and Grounds within the several Tithings of Bourton, Easton, Horton, Nursteed and Week, in the Parish of Bishops Cannings, in the County of Wilts.
Shipley Inclosure Act 1815	55 Geo. 3. c. 18 Pr.	12 May 1815
An Act for inclosing Lands within the Manor and Township of Shipley, in the Parish of Bradford, in the West Riding of the County of York.
Grasby Inclosure Act 1815	55 Geo. 3. c. 19 Pr.	12 May 1815
An Act for inclosing and exonerating from Tithes, Lands in the Parish of Grasby, in the County of Lincoln.
Brodsworth Inclosure Act 1815	55 Geo. 3. c. 20 Pr.	12 May 1815
An Act for inclosing, and exonerating from Tithes, Lands in the Parish of Brodsworth, in the County of York.
Dewlish Inclosure Act 1815	55 Geo. 3. c. 21 Pr.	12 May 1815
An Act for inclosing Lands in the Parish of Dewlish in the County of Dorset.
Melsonby Inclosure Act 1815	55 Geo. 3. c. 22 Pr.	12 May 1815
An Act for inclosing Lands in the Manor and Parish of Melsonby, in the County of York
Brampton, &c. Inclosure Act 1815	55 Geo. 3. c. 23 Pr.	12 May 1815
An Act for inclosing Lands in the Townships of Brampton, Wath upon Dearne and Swinton, in the West Riding of the County of York
Neighton Inclosure Act 1815	55 Geo. 3. c. 24 Pr.	12 May 1815
An Act for inclosing Lands in the Parish of Necton otherwise Neighton, in the County of Norfolk.
Corscombe Inclosure Act 1815	55 Geo. 3. c. 25 Pr.	12 May 1815
An Act for inclosing Lands in the Parish of Corscombe, in the County of Dorset.
Runcton Holme Inclosure Act 1815	55 Geo. 3. c. 26 Pr.	12 May 1815
An Act for inclosing Lands in the Parishes of South Runcton and Holme, otherwise Runcton Holme, in the County of Norfolk.
Appletreewick Inclosure Act 1815	55 Geo. 3. c. 27 Pr.	12 May 1815
An Act for inclosing Lands in the Township of Appletreewick, in the Parish of Burnsal, in the West Riding of the County of York.
Hilperton and Trowbridge Inclosure Act 1815	55 Geo. 3. c. 28 Pr.	12 May 1815
An Act for inclosing Lands in the Parishes of Hilperton and Trowbridge, in the County of Wilts
Miserdine Inclosure Act 1815	55 Geo. 3. c. 29 Pr.	12 May 1815
An Act for inclosing Lands in the Parish of Miserden otherwise Miserdine, in the County of Gloucester.
Almondbury Inclosure Act 1815	55 Geo. 3. c. 30 Pr.	12 May 1815
An Act for inclosing the Marsh Common, otherwise Salt Marsh, in the Parish of Almondsbury, in the County of Gloucester.
Horwich Moor Inclosure Act 1815	55 Geo. 3. c. 31 Pr.	25 May 1815
An Act for inclosing Horwich Moor, in the Parish of Dean, in the County Palatine of Lancaster.
Stansfield Inclosure Act 1815	55 Geo. 3. c. 32 Pr.	25 May 1815
An Act for inclosing Lands within the Township of Stansfield, in the Parish of Halifax, in the County of York.
Witherslack Inclosure Act 1815	55 Geo. 3. c. 33 Pr.	25 May 1815
An Act for inclosing Lands in the Manor or Lordship of Witherslack, in the County of Westmorland.
Rumworth Inclosure Act 1815	55 Geo. 3. c. 34 Pr.	25 May 1815
An Act for inclosing Lands in the Township of Rumworth, and Parish of Dean, in the County Palatine of Lancaster.
Wisewood Common Inclosure Act 1815	55 Geo. 3. c. 35 Pr.	25 May 1815
An Act for inclosing Wisewood Common, in the Parish of Ecclesfield, in the County of York.
Thornhill Inclosure Act 1815	55 Geo. 3. c. 36 Pr.	25 May 1815
An Act for inclosing Lands in the Manor of Thornhill, in the Parish of Thornhill, in the West Riding of the County of York.
Llangeinwen, &c. Inclosure Act 1815	55 Geo. 3. c. 37 Pr.	25 May 1815
An Act for inclosing Lands in the Parishes of Llangeinwen and Llanbed'r Newborough, in the County of Anglesea.
Duke of Newcastle's Estate Act 1815	55 Geo. 3. c. 38 Pr.	7 June 1815
An Act for vesting Part of the settled Estates, in the County of Somerset, of Sir Henry Strachey Baronet, in Trustees upon Trust, to be sold, and for investing the Purchase Monies in the Purchase of Estates to be settled to the former Uses, and for enabling the Trustees to concur in making a Partition of such of the same Estates as are now held by Sir Henry Strachey and other Persons in undivided Shares.
Strachey's Estate Act 1815	55 Geo. 3. c. 39 Pr.	7 June 1815
An Act for vesting Part of the settled Estates, in the County of Somerset, of Sir Henry Strachey Baronet, in Trustees upon Trust, to be sold, and for investing the Purchase Monies in the Purchase of Estates to be settled to the former Uses, and for enabling the Trustees to concur in making a Partition of such of the same Estates as are now held by Sir Henry Strachey and other Persons in undivided Shares.
Sutton in Kildwick Inclosure Act 1815	55 Geo. 3. c. 40 Pr.	7 June 1815
An Act for inclosing Lands within the Township of Sutton, in the Parish of Kildwick, in the West Riding of the County of York.
Hutton Roof Inclosure Act 1815	55 Geo. 3. c. 41 Pr.	7 June 1815
An Act for inclosing Lands within the Township of Hutton Roof, in the Parish of Kirkby Lonsdale, in the County of Westmorland.
Breadsall Inclosure Act 1815	55 Geo. 3. c. 42 Pr.	7 June 1815
An Act for inclosing Lands in the Parish of Breadfall, in the County of Derby.
Hartlebury Inclosure Act 1815	55 Geo. 3. c. 43 Pr.	7 June 1815
An Act for inclosing Lands in the Manor of Hartlebury, in the Parish of Hartlebury, in the County of Worcester.
Brampton Inclosure Act 1815	55 Geo. 3. c. 44 Pr.	7 June 1815
An Act for inclosing Lands in Brampton, in the County of Derby.
Hindringham Inclosure Act 1815	55 Geo. 3. c. 45 Pr.	7 June 1815
An Act for inclosing Lands in the Parish of Hindringham, in the County of Norfolk.
Aston Rogers and Cound Inclosure Act 1815	55 Geo. 3. c. 46 Pr.	7 June 1815
An Act for inclosing Lands in the Manors of Aston Rogers and Cound, in the County of Salop.
Marcham Inclosure Act 1815	55 Geo. 3. c. 47 Pr.	7 June 1815
An Act for inclosing Lands in the Township of Marcham, in the Parish of Marcham, in the County of Berks.
Chelworth Inclosure Act 1815	55 Geo. 3. c. 48 Pr.	7 June 1815
An Act for explaining and amending an Act of His present Majesty, (Note: Great and Little Chelworth Inclosures Act 1814 (54 Geo. 3. c. clx)) for inclosing Lands in the Manors of Great Chelworth and Little Chelworth, in the Parishes of Cricklade Saint Sampson and Cricklade Saint Mary, in the County of Wilts.
Willesdon Inclosure Act 1815	55 Geo. 3. c. 49 Pr.	7 June 1815
An Act for inclosing the Open and Common Fields, Meadows, Commonable Lands and Waste Grounds, within the Parish of Willesden, in the County of Middlesex.
Upton Lovell Inclosure Act 1815	55 Geo. 3. c. 50 Pr.	14 June 1815
An Act for inclosing Lands in the Parish of Upton Lovell, in the County of Wilts.
Stoke Ferry, &c. Inclosure Act 1815	55 Geo. 3. c. 51 Pr.	14 June 1815
An Act for inclosing Lands in the Parishes of Stoke otherwise Stoke Ferry, Wretton, Wereham, and Hamlet of Winnold, in the County of Norfolk.
North Kelsey Inclosure Act 1815	55 Geo. 3. c. 52 Pr.	14 June 1815
An Act for amending an Act of His present Majesty (Note: North Kelsey Drainage and Inclosure Act 1813 (53 Geo. 3. c. clix)) for inclosing and exonerating from Tithes, Lands in the Lordship of North Kelsey, in the County of Lincoln.
Milnes's Estate Act 1815	55 Geo. 3. c. 53 Pr.	22 June 1815
An Act for empowering the Trustees under the Will of James Milnes Esquire, deceased, to effect a Partition of the Estates whereof undivided Shares were devised by such Will.
Nunn's Estate Act 1815	55 Geo. 3. c. 54 Pr.	22 June 1815
An Act to enable the Devisees in Trust and Executors named in the Will of William Nunn Esquire, deceased, to grant Leases of his Residuary Leasehold Estates.
Falkland, &c. Inclosure Act 1815	55 Geo. 3. c. 55 Pr.	28 June 1815
An Act for dividing and allotting the Common or Commonty of the Lomonds of Falkland, in the Parishes of Falkland and Strathmiglo, in the County of Fife.
Duke of Grafton's Estate Act 1815 (repealed)	55 Geo. 3. c. 56 Pr.	4 July 1815
An Act for enabling the Sale of all or any Part of the Stocks already transferred in Redemption of Part of the Annuity of Six thousand eight hundred and seventy Pounds, payable out of the Consolidated Fund in lieu of the Duties of Prisage and Butlerage of Wines granted by King Charles the Second to Henry First Henry Duke of Grafton, and the Heirs Male of his Body, and the Stocks which shall be transferred in Redemption of the Remainder of the same Annuity, and investing the Money arising from any such Sale in the Purchase of Manors, Lands and Hereditaments and for other Purposes. (Repealed by Statute Law (Repeals) Act 1993 (c. 50))
Burslem Rectory Act 1815	55 Geo. 3. c. 57 Pr.	4 July 1815
An Act for vesting the Glebe Lands belonging to the Rectory of Burslem, in the County of Stafford, in Trustees for Sale, and for applying the net Monies thence arising in providing a Parsonage House for the said Rectory, and in the Purchase of other Estates to be settled and annexed thereto.
Bucknall's Estate Act 1815	55 Geo. 3. c. 58 Pr.	4 July 1815
An Act for vesting certain Hereditaments devised by the Will of Thomas Skip Dyot Bucknall Esquire deceased, called The Dyot Estate, in Trustees, to sell the same; and to lay out the Monies thence arising in the Purchase of other Estates, to be settled to the same Uses.
Bishopstone Rectory Act 1815	55 Geo. 3. c. 59 Pr.	6 July 1815
An Act for uniting the Vicarage and Rectory of Bishopstone, in the County of Wilts, and within the Diocese of Salisbury, into one Rectory with Cure of Souls.
Shireoaks Estate Act 1815	55 Geo. 3. c. 60 Pr.	6 July 1815
An Act for exonerating certain Tithes in the Manor of Shireoaks, in the Parish of Worksop, in the County of Nottingham, from the Payment of Four several Annuities, and from the Repairs of the Chapel of Shireoaks, and for charging Freehold Lands and the Tithes thereof, within the same Manor, with the future Payment of the said Annuities, and with the said Repairs.
Bere Forest Inclosure Act 1815	55 Geo. 3. c. 61 Pr.	6 July 1815
An Act to enable the Lord Bishop of Winchester to grant Leases of Lands allotted to him under an Act of the Fiftieth Year of His present Majesty, (Note: Bere Forest Inclosure Act 1810 (50 Geo. 3. c. ccxviii)) for disafforesting the Forest of South otherwise East Bere otherwise Bier, in the County of Southampton, and for inclosing the Open Commonable Lands within the said Forest.
Boynton's Estate Act 1815	55 Geo. 3. c. 62 Pr.	6 July 1815
An Act for vesting Part of the Settled Estates of Sir Francis Boynton Baronet, in Trustees, to be sold, and for applying the Produce in the Purchase of other Estates to be settled to the same Uses as the Estates so sold.
Powell's Estate Act 1815	55 Geo. 3. c. 63 Pr.	6 July 1815
An Act for effecting the Sale of certain settled Estates of Ann Powell, Widow, and Elizabeth Parry, and for laying out the Purchase Money, under the Direction of the High Court of Chancery, in the Purchase of other Estates to be settled to the former Uses.
Bishop's Estate Act 1815	55 Geo. 3. c. 64 Pr.	6 July 1815
An Act for enabling Nathanael Bishop Esquire to carry into Execution certain Articles of Agreement for a Building Lease of a Part of his Settled Estate, in the Parish of Saint Mary Islington, in the County of Middlesex, entered into by him with Robert Clarke Gentleman and Henry Richardson Gentleman.
Dampier's Estate Act 1815	55 Geo. 3. c. 65 Pr.	6 July 1815
An Act for exchanging certain Fee Simple Estates of the Reverend John Dampier Clerk, in the County of Somerset, for certain Settled Estates of the said John Dampier and Mary Charlotte his Wife, in the same County.
Royal Military Asylum Act 1815 or the Chelsea Glebe Lands Act 1815	55 Geo. 3. c. 66 Pr.	11 July 1815
An Act for effectuating an Agreement for Sale of Part of the Glebe Lands belonging to the Rector of the Parish Church of Chelsea, in the County of Middlesex, for the Use of the Royal Military Asylum.
Chitterne, &c. Inclosure Act 1815	55 Geo. 3. c. 67 Pr.	11 July 1815
An Act for inclosing Lands in the Parishes of Chitterne Saint Mary and Chitterne All Saints, in the County of Wilts, and for repealing an Act passed in the Reign of His present Majesty, (Note: Chitterne St. Mary Inclosure Act 1810 (50 Geo. 3. c. 18 Pr.)) for inclosing Lands within the Manor and Parish of Chitterne Saint Mary, in the County of Wilts.
Teignmouth Churches Act 1815	55 Geo. 3. c. 68 Pr.	12 July 1815
An Act for enlarging and repairing the Parish Churches of East and West Teignmouth, in the County of Devon, and for authorizing the Sale of divers Hereditaments in East and West Teignmouth, Islington and Highweek, in the said County; and for discharging the Expences to be occasioned thereby.
Deptford Charity Lands Act 1815	55 Geo. 3. c. 69 Pr.	12 July 1815
An Act for better carrying into Execution the Trusts of certain Charity Lands at Deptford, in the County of Kent.
Mason's Estate Act 1815	55 Geo. 3. c. 70 Pr.	12 July 1815
An Act for vesting in a new Trustee upon the subsisting Trufts, certain Estates of John Mason Esquire, deceased, now vested in Infant Trustees.
Sandhurst Inclosure Act 1815	55 Geo. 3. c. 71 Pr.	12 July 1815
An Act for inclosing Lands in the Parish of Sandhurst, in the County of Berks.
Woolavington, &c. Inclosure Act 1815 (Note: This act was not printed by the King's Printer.)	55 Geo. 3. c. 72 Pr.	23 March 1815
An Act for inclosing Lands in the Parishes of Woolavington and Graffham, in the County of Sussex.
Cottingham Inclosure Act 1815	55 Geo. 3. c. 73 Pr.	23 March 1815
An Act for inclosing Lands in the Parish of Cottingham cum Middleton, in the County of Northampton.
Ilminster Inclosure Act 1815	55 Geo. 3. c. 74 Pr.	2 May 1815
An Act for inclosing Lands in the Parish of Ilminster, in the County of Somerset.
Packwood Inclosure Act 1815	55 Geo. 3. c. 75 Pr.	2 May 1815
An Act for inclosing Lands in the Parish of Packwood, in the County of Warwick.
East Bergholt Inclosure Act 1815	55 Geo. 3. c. 76 Pr.	2 May 1815
An Act for inclosing Lands in the Parish of East Bergholt, in the County of Suffolk.
Youlgreave Inclosure Act 1815	55 Geo. 3. c. 77 Pr.	2 May 1815
An Act for inclosing Lands in the Townships, Hamlets or Manors of Youlgreave and Middleton by Youlgreave, both in the Parish of Youlgreave, in the County of Derby.
Knock Inclosure Act 1815	55 Geo. 3. c. 78 Pr.	2 May 1815
An Act for inclosing Lands within the Township of Knock, in the Parish of Long Marton, in the County of Westmorland.
Papworth Everard Inclosure Act 1815	55 Geo. 3. c. 79 Pr.	2 May 1815
An Act for inclosing Lands in the Parish of Papworth Everard, in the County of Cambridge.
Barston, &c. Inclosure Act 1815	55 Geo. 3. c. 80 Pr.	2 May 1815
An Act for inclosing Lands in the Parishes of Barston and Berkswell, in the County of Warwick.
Gwnnws, &c. Inclosure Act 1815	55 Geo. 3. c. 81 Pr.	2 May 1815
An Act for inclosing Lands in the Parish of Gwnnws, and several other Parishes therein mentioned, and in the Township of Llanrhystid Mevenidd, in the County of Cardigan.
Halford's Name Act 1815	55 Geo. 3. c. 82 Pr.	2 May 1815
An Act for continuing and confirming on Sir Henry Halford Baronet, and the Heirs Male of his Body, the Surname and Arms of Halford only.
Power's Estate Act 1815	55 Geo. 3. c. 83 Pr.	12 May 1815
An Act for carrying into effect an Agreement between the Right Honourable Stephen Earl of Mount Cashel, and John Power of Affane, in the County of Waterford, Esquire, for the Surrender to the said Earl of a Lease for Lives, renewable for ever, of certain Lands of Kilcorroon, called Doon, in the County of Tipperary, comprised in the Settlement executed on the Marriage of the said John Power with Ann his Wife, deceased.
Coulthard's Estate Act 1815	55 Geo. 3. c. 84 Pr.	12 May 1815
An Act for effecting a Partition between Thomas Coulthard and James Battin Coulthard Esquires, of Estates in the County of Southampton.
Isle Abbotts, &c. Inclosure Act 1815	55 Geo. 3. c. 85 Pr.	12 May 1815
An Act for inclosing Lands in the Parishes of Isle Abbots, Fivehead, Swell, Curry Mallett, Curry Rivell, Beercrocombe, Ashill Ilton, White Lackington, and Isle Brewers, in the County of Somerset.
Little Rowsley Inclosure Act 1815	55 Geo. 3. c. 86 Pr.	12 May 1815
An Act for inclosing Lands in the Manor or Hamlet of Little Rowsley, in the Parish of Darley, in the County of Derby.
Freckenham Inclosure Act 1815	55 Geo. 3. c. 87 Pr.	12 May 1815
An Act for inclosing Lands within the Parish of Freckenham, in the County of Suffolk.
Chard Inclosure Act 1815	55 Geo. 3. c. 88 Pr.	12 May 1815
An Act for inclosing Lands in the Parish of Chard, in the County of Somerset.
Noneley Inclosure Act 1815	55 Geo. 3. c. 89 Pr.	12 May 1815
An Act for inclosing Lands in the Township of Noneley, in the Parish of Loppington, and County of Salop.
Barnet Inclosure Act 1815	55 Geo. 3. c. 90 Pr.	12 May 1815
An Act for inclosing Lands in the Manor of Chipping Barnet and East Barnet, in the Parish of Barnet in the County of Hertford.
Rowington and Bushwood Inclosure Act 1815	55 Geo. 3. c. 91 Pr.	12 May 1815
An Act for inclosing Lands in the Manors of Rowington and Bushwood, in the Parishes of Rowington, Old Stratford and Lapworth, in the County of Warwick.
Maenclochog, &c. Inclosure Act 1815	55 Geo. 3. c. 92 Pr.	12 May 1815
An Act for inclosing Lands in the Parishes of Maenclochog, Llangolman and Llandilo, in the County of Pembroke.
Uffculme, &c. Inclosure Act 1815	55 Geo. 3. c. 93 Pr.	12 May 1815
An Act for inclosing Lands in the Parishes of Uffculme, Halberton and Willand, in the County of Devon.
Langham Inclosure Act 1815	55 Geo. 3. c. 94 Pr.	12 May 1815
An Act for inclosing Lands in the Parish of Langham, in the County of Norfolk.
Piddletrenhide Inclosure Act 1815	55 Geo. 3. c. 95 Pr.	12 May 1815
An Act for inclosing Lands within the Parish of Piddletrenthide, otherwise Colliers Piddle, in the County of Dorset.
Thompson Inclosure Act 1815	55 Geo. 3. c. 96 Pr.	12 May 1815
An Act for inclosing Lands in the Parish of Thompson, in the County of Norfolk.
Lord Sommers's Estate Act 1815	55 Geo. 3. c. 97 Pr.	7 June 1815
An Act to exonerate certain Estates and Trust Money from the Payment of a Jointure Annuity settled upon the Right Honourable Margaret Lady Sommers, and from Portions settled on the younger Children of the Right Honourable John Sommers Lord Sommers, by the said Margaret Lady Sommers, his Wife, and for charging the same upon other Manors and Estates in the County of Worcester, and for confirming a Decree of the Court of Chancery, and other Purposes relative thereto.
Marriott's Estate Act 1815	55 Geo. 3. c. 98 Pr.	7 June 1815
An Act for vesting a settled Estate of George Marriott in him in Fee Simple, and for settling another Estate in lieu thereof.
Mildenhall Inclosure Act 1815	55 Geo. 3. c. 99 Pr.	7 June 1815
An Act for inclosing Lands in the Parishes of Collingbourn Kingston, and Burbage, and in the Tithing of Poulton, in the Parish of Mildenhall, in the County of Wilts.
Caereinion Uchoed Inclosure Act 1815	55 Geo. 3. c. 100 Pr.	7 June 1815
An Act for inclosing Lands in the Manor or District of Caereinion Uchoed, in the County of Montgomery.
Hepworth Inclosure Act 1815	55 Geo. 3. c. 101 Pr.	14 June 1815
An Act for inclosing Lands in the Parish of Hepworth, in the County of Suffolk.
Iffley Inclosure Act 1815	55 Geo. 3. c. 102 Pr.	22 June 1815
An Act for inclosing Lands within the Township or Liberty of Yeftley otherwise Iffley, within the Manor and Parish of Yeftley otherwise Iffley, in the County of Oxford.
Harford's Name Act 1815	55 Geo. 3. c. 103 Pr.	22 June 1815
An Act to enable Abraham Gray Harford Esquire, and his Heirs, to take the Name and bear the Arms of Battersby, pursuant to the Will of William Battersby Esquire.
Earl of Rosebery's Divorce Act 1815	55 Geo. 3. c. 104 Pr.	28 June 1815
An Act to dissolve the Marriage of the Right Honourable Archibald John Earl of Rosebery with Harriet Countess of Rosebery his Wife, and to enable him to marry again; and for other Purposes.
Thomas's Name Act 1815	55 Geo. 3. c. 105 Pr.	28 June 1815
An Act to enable Henry Thomas Esquire, and his Issue, to use and bear the Surname and Arms of Greene, pursuant to the Will of his maternal Grandfather Henry Greene, Clerk, deceased.
Bourne Inclosure Act 1815	55 Geo. 3. c. 106 Pr.	29 June 1815
An Act for confirming the Inclosure of certain Lands in the Parish of Bourne, in the County of Southampton, so far as relates to certain Allotments made to Elizabeth Carter Widow and John Carter deceased.
Brydges's Estate Act 1815	55 Geo. 3. c. 107 Pr.	6 July 1815
An Act for enabling the surviving Trustee of Part of the Settled Estates of Sir Samuel Egerton Brydges Baronet, vested in Trustees by an Act made in the Thirty fifth Year of the Reign of His present Majesty, (Note: Brydges' Estate Act 1795 (35 Geo. 3. c. 60 Pr.)) upon Trust, to be sold or exchanged, to convey the same to the subsisting Uses, discharged of the Trusts of the said Act.
Smethwick Chapelry Act 1815	55 Geo. 3. c. 108 Pr.	6 July 1815
An Act for confirming the Inclosure of certain Lands in the Parish of Bourne, in the County of Southampton, so far as relates to certain Allotments made to Elizabeth Carter Widow and John Carter deceased.
Parker's Name Act 1815	55 Geo. 3. c. 109 Pr.	6 July 1815
An Act for enabling Charles Newdigate Parker, calling himself Charles Newdigate Newdegate Esquire, to take the Name and Arms of Newdegate; and also for extinguishing a certain Rent Charge (subject to a Life Estate in Part thereof) pursuant to certain Conditions contained in the Will and Codicil of Sir Roger Nerudigate Baronet, deceased.
Moulsey Inclosure Act 1815	55 Geo. 3. c. 110 Pr.	6 July 1815
An Act for inclosing Lands in the Parishes of East Moulsey and West Moulsey, in the County of Surry.
Christie's Divorce Act 1815	55 Geo. 3. c. 111 Pr.	6 July 1815
An Act for dissolving the Marriage of Charles Christie Esquire with Thomasine his now Wife, and for enabling him to marry again; and for other Purposes therein mentioned.
Powles's Divorce Act 1815	55 Geo. 3. c. 112 Pr.	6 July 1815
An Act to dissolve the Marriage of John Diston Powles, with Louisa his Wife, and to enable him to marry again; and for other Purposes therein mentioned.

=== Sources ===
- The Statutes of the United Kingdom of Great Britain and Ireland, 55 George III. 1815. London. 1815 – via Google Books.
- Raithby, John (1816). "55 Georgii° III". The Statutes of the United Kingdom of Great Britain and Ireland. Vol. 6: Containing the Acts 55 George III. (1815.) and 56 George III. (1816.). London: Eyre and Strahan. pp. 1–696 – via Internet Archive.
- Journals of the House of Commons. Vol. 70. London: His Majesty's Stationery Office. pp. 3–475 – via Google Books.
- Chronological Table of and Index to the Statutes. Vol. 1: To the End of the Session 59 Vict. Sess. 2 (1895) (13th ed.). London: Her Majesty's Stationery Office. 1896. pp. 210–214 – via Google Books.

== See also ==
- List of acts of the Parliament of the United Kingdom
