= Prisons (Ireland) Act 1826 =

Act of the Parliament of the United Kingdom

Prisons (Ireland) Act 1826 (Note: The citation of this act by this short title was authorised by section 1 of, and the first schedule to, the Short Titles Act 1896. Due to the repeal of those provisions it is now authorised by section 19(2) of the Interpretation Act 1978.)
- Act of Parliament
- Parliament of the United Kingdom
- Long title: An Act for consolidating and amending the Laws relating to Prisons in Ireland.
- Citation: 7 Geo. 4. c. 74
- Territorial extent: United Kingdom

Dates
- Royal assent: 31 May 1826
- Commencement: 1 July 1826 (Note: Section 142.)
- Repealed: 24 March 1953
Other legislation
Amends	See § Repealed enactments
Repeals/revokes	See § Repealed enactments
Amended by	Prisons (Ireland) Act 1840; Prisons (Ireland) Act 1846
Repealed by	Prison Act (Northern Ireland) 1953

Status: Repealed

Text of statute as originally enacted

The Prisons (Ireland) Act 1826 (7 Geo. 4. c. 74) was an act of the Parliament of the United Kingdom that consolidated enactments related to prisons in Ireland.

== Provisions ==
=== Repealed enactments ===
Section 1 of the act repealed 6 enactments, listed that section.

Citation	Short title	Description	Extent of repeal
50 Geo. 3. c. 103	Prisons (Ireland) Act 1810	An Act made in the Fiftieth Year of the Reign of His late Majesty, intituled An Act for repealing the several Laws relating to Prisons in Ireland.	The whole act.
55 Geo. 3. c. 92	Prisons (Ireland) Act 1815	An Act made in the Fifty fifth Year of His said late Majesty's Reign, intituled An Act to amend an Act of the Fiftieth Year of His present Majesty's Reign, relating to Prisons in Ireland, so far as concerns Contracts for building or repairing such Prisons.	The whole act.
57 Geo. 3. c.	Prisoners (Ireland) Act 1817	An Act made in the Fifty seventh Year of His said late Majesty's Reign, for amending the said recited Act of the Fiftieth Year of His said late Majesty's Reign.	The whole act.
59 Geo. 3. c. 84	Kinsale Act 1819	An Act passed in the Fifty ninth Year of His said late Majesty's Reign, intituled An Act to amend the Laws for repairing and improving the Roads and other Public Works in Ireland by Grand Jury Presentments, and for a more effectual Investigation of such Presentments, and for further securing a true, full and faithful Account of all the Monies levied under the same.	As in anyway relates to Gaols, Bridewells, Workhouses, Houses of Correction or other Prisons, so far only as the said Act or any of the Provi sions therein contained are contrary to this Act.
59 Geo. 3. c. 100	Prisons (Ireland) Act 1819	Another Act made in the Fifty ninth Year of His said late Majesty's Reign intituled An Act to amend an Act of the Fiftieth Year of the Reign ofHis present Majesty, relating to Prisons in Ireland.	The whole act.
3 Geo. 4. c. 64	Prisons (Ireland) Act 1822	An Act made in the Third Year of the Reign of His present Majesty, intituled An Act to amend the Laws relating to Prisons in Ireland	The whole act.

== Subsequent developments ==
The whole act was repealed by the section 48 of, and the fifth schedule to, the Prison Act (Northern Ireland) 1953, which came into force on 24 March 1953.
