= Prisons (Ireland) Act 1810 =

Act of the Parliament of the United Kingdom

- Act of Parliament
- Parliament of the United Kingdom
- Long title: An Act for repealing the several Laws relating to Prisons in Ireland, and for re-enacting such of the Provisions thereof as have been found useful, with Amendments.
- Citation: 50 Geo. 3. c. 103
- Territorial extent: Ireland (Note: Long title.)

Dates
- Royal assent: 20 June 1810
- Commencement: 1 July 1810 (Note: Section 93.)
- Repealed: 1 July 1826
Other legislation
Amends	See § Repealed enactments
Repeals/revokes	See § Repealed enactments
Amended by	Prisons (Ireland) Act 1815; Prisoners (Ireland) Act 1817; Prisons (Ireland) Act 1819; Prisons (Ireland) Act 1822
Repealed by	Prisons (Ireland) Act 1826

Status: Repealed

Text of statute as originally enacted

The Prisons (Ireland) Act 1810 (50 Geo. 3. c. 103) was an act of the Parliament of the United Kingdom that consolidated enactments related to prisons in Ireland.

== Provisions ==
=== Repealed enactments ===
Section ? of the act repealed ? enactments, listed in that section.

Citation	Short title	Description	Extent of repeal
17 & 18 Chas. 2. c. 8 (I)	Poor Prisoners Relief Act 1666	An Act passed in the Seventeenth and Eighteenth Years of the Reign of King Charles the Second, intituled, AnAdfor Relief of Poor Prisoners.	The whole act.
10 Will. 3. c. 9 (I)	Four Courts Marshalsea Regulation Act 1698	An Act passed in the Tenth Year of King William the Third, intituled, An Act for regulating the Fees of the Marshal of the Four Courts, and for settling the Rates of Lodgings, and Redress of other Abuses in the said Marshalsea, and in the Marshalsea of the City of Dublin.	The whole act.
3 Geo. 3. c. 28 (I)	Criminal Justice Act 1763	An Act passed in the Third Year of the Reign of His present Majesty, intituled, An Act for better preventing the Severities and unjust Exactions practised by Gaolers against their Prisoners, and for more effectually Supporting Prosecutions at the Suit of the Crown in Cafes of Felony and Treason.	As relates to the Fees and Conduct of Gaolers, and the Regulation and Improvement of Gaols.
7 Geo. 3. c. 4 (I)	County Buildings Rent Act 1767	An Act passed in the Seventh Year of the Reign of His present Majesty, intituled, An Act to enable Grand Juries to raise by Presentment Money for discharging the Rents of Court Houses, Gaols and Offices, for keeping the Records of the respective Counties, and for other Purposes.	As relates to the Gaols and Workhouses or Houses of Correction.
17 & 18 Geo. 3. c. 28 (I)	Prisoners Health Act 1777	An Act passed in the Seventeenth and Eighteenth Years of the Reign of His present Majesty, intituled, An Act for preserving ing the Health of Prisoners in Gaol, and preventing the Gaol Distemper.	The whole act.
21 & 22 Geo. 3. c. 40 (I)	Expiring Laws Continuance Act 1781	An Act passed in the Twenty first and Twenty second Years of the Reign of His present Majesty, intituled, An Act for reviving, continuing andamending several temporary Statutes.	As relates to the Allowance of Bread to Prisoners.
21 & 22 Geo. 3. c. 42 (I)	Gaols and Prisons Act 1781	An Act passed in the said Year, intituled, An Act for enforcing the due Execution of the Laws now in being, and for the better regulating the Publick Gaols and Prisons in this Kingdom, and providing necessary Accommodation for thePersons confined therein, and for the more effectual Administration of Justice at Sesions, and by Justices of the Peace in Cities and Counties of Cities within this Kingdom.	As relates to Gaols or Gaolers, or any Presentment for the same.
23 & 24 Geo. 3. c. 41 (I)	Prisons Act 1783	An Act passed in the Twenty third and Twenty fourth Years of the Reign of His present Majesty, intituled, An Act for altering, amending and rendering more effectual the Laws now in being, for regulating and managing the Publick Gaols and Prisons throughout this Kingdom.	As relates to the building, repairing and regulating Gaols or to Gaolers.
26 Geo. 3. c. 14 (I)	County Dublin Roads Act 1786	An Act passed in the Twenty sixth Year of the Reign of His present Majesty, intituled, An Act for making, widening and repairing Publick Roads in the County of Dublin, and for repealing Parts of several Acts formerly made for that Purpose.	As relates to any Presentment for any of the Matters for which Prefent ments are authorized by this Act.
26 Geo. 3. c. 27 (I)	Prisons Regulation Act 1786	An Act passed in the said Year, intituled, An Act for amending and carrying more effectually into force the several Laws now in being for regulating the Publick Gaols and Prisons throughout this Kingdom.	The whole act.
26 Geo. 3. c. 43 (I)	Grand Jury Gaols Act 1786	An Act passed in the said Year, intituled, An Act to enable the Grand Juries of the several Counties of Cities and Counties of Towns within this Kingdom, to grant such Sums as shall all be necessary for building and repairing Bridewells therein.	As relates to the building, repairing or Government of Bridewells, or as to the Accommodations therein or to the Keepers thereof.
27 Geo. 3. c. 39 (I)	Prisons Regulation Act 1787	An Act passed in the Twenty seventh Year of the Reign of His present Majesty, to explain and amend the said first mentioned Act of the Twenty sixth Year of the Reign of Hispresent Majesty.	As relates to any Prifons or Medicines for the fame, or any Inspectors.
33 Geo. 3. c. 35 (I)	Dublin Marshalsea Act 1793	An Act passed in the Thirty third Year of the Reign of His present Majesty, intituled, An Act for the better Regulation of the Marshalsea of the Four Courts in Dublin.	The whole act.
33 Geo. 3. c. 56 (I)	Dublin Grand Jury Presentments Act 1793	An Act passed in the said Year, intituled, An Act respecting the Collection of Publick Money to be levied in the County of the City of Dublin by Presentment.	As relates to the repairing of Gaols, and the Salary of the Chaplain or Ordinary of the New Prison in Dublin.
39 Geo. 3. c. 55 (I)	Gaols Act 1799	An Act passed in the Thirty ninth Year of the Reign of His present Majesty, intituled, An Act to promote the building of new Gaols.	As relates to the building of Gaols.
49 Geo. 3. c. xx	Dublin Public Money Collection Act 1809	An Act passed in the Forty ninth Year of His Majesty's Reign, intituled, An Act to alter and amend an Act of Parliament of Ireland, passed in the Thirty third Year of His present Majesty, intituled, An Act respecting the Collection of Publick Money, to be levied in the County of the City of Dublin by Presentment, and for the better Regulation of the Mode of Election and Office of Treasurer of the Publick Money of the City of Dublin.	As relates to the Bills of Apothecaries for Medicines and Necessaries provided for Prisoners, or to any Presentment for the same.

== Subsequent developments ==
The whole act was repealed by section 1 of the Prisons (Ireland) Act 1826 (7 Geo. 4. c. 74), which came into force on 1 July 1826.
