= Grade II* listed buildings in Stroud (district) =

There are over 20,000 Grade II* listed buildings in England. This page is a list of these buildings in the district of Stroud in Gloucestershire.

== Stroud ==
Name	Location	Type	Completed (Note: The date given is the date used by Historic England as significant for the initial building or that of an important part in the structure's description.)	Date designated	Grid ref. (Note: The grid reference is based on the British national grid reference system, sometimes known as OSGB36, used by the Ordnance Survey.) Geo-coordinates	Entry number (Note: The "List Entry Number" is a unique number assigned to each listed building and scheduled monument by Historic England.)	Image
Stanton Monument, about 4m North-west of West Door in Churchyard of Church of St Kenelm	Alderley, Stroud	Chest Tomb	Late 16th century	9 September 1985	ST7683590806; 51°36′56″N 2°20′09″W	1090614	Upload Photo
The Grange	Alderley, Stroud	Country house	1608	17 September 1952	ST7687390985; 51°37′02″N 2°20′08″W	1090620	Upload Photo
The Mount House, with Railings Gates and Gate Piers on North Side	Alderley, Stroud	Detached House	Late 17th century	17 September 1952	ST7692390772; 51°36′55″N 2°20′05″W	1090653	The Mount House, with Railings Gates and Gate Piers on North Side More images
Wick Court, with Railings and Wall to North	Arlingham, Stroud	House	19th century	10 January 1955	SO7357610474; 51°47′32″N 2°23′04″W	1090581	Wick Court, with Railings and Wall to North More images
Jenner Hut, in Garden of the Chantry	Berkeley, Stroud	Summerhouse	Late 18th century	21 October 1952	ST6849399093; 51°41′23″N 2°27′26″W	1090633	Jenner Hut, in Garden of the Chantry More images
The Chantry	Berkeley, Stroud	Detached House	Early 18th century	21 October 1952	ST6847799154; 51°41′25″N 2°27′27″W	1304580	The Chantry More images
Barn adjoining and to North West of Ferris Court Farmhouse	Bisley-with-Lypiatt, Stroud	Clothing Workshop	c. 1700	28 June 1960	SO8853804940; 51°44′35″N 2°10′03″W	1340338	Upload Photo
Chapel adjoining and to North West of the Mansion	Lypiatt Park, Bisley-with-Lypiatt, Stroud	Chapel	Late 14th century	28 June 1960	SO8857805880; 51°45′05″N 2°10′01″W	1340354	Upload Photo
Church of All Saints	Bisley, Bisley-with-Lypiatt, Stroud	Parish Church	13th century and 14th century	28 June 1960	SO9036705932; 51°45′07″N 2°08′27″W	1340362	Church of All Saints More images
Cockpit with Dovecote approx. 40m South West of Jayne's Court	Bisley, Bisley-with-Lypiatt, Stroud	Dovecote	Early 19th century	28 June 1960	SO9026805846; 51°45′04″N 2°08′33″W	1340357	Upload Photo
Jayne's Court	Bisley, Bisley-with-Lypiatt, Stroud	House	c. 1715	28 June 1960	SO9030505871; 51°45′05″N 2°08′31″W	1091317	Upload Photo
Lock Up with Forecourt Wall	Bisley, Bisley-with-Lypiatt, Stroud	Gaol	C20	28 June 1960	SO9035406054; 51°45′11″N 2°08′28″W	1340366	Lock Up with Forecourt Wall More images
Middle Lypiatt Farmhouse	Middle Lypiatt, Bisley-with-Lypiatt, Stroud	Farmhouse	Mid-late 16th century	28 June 1960	SO8772404684; 51°44′27″N 2°10′45″W	1091275	Upload Photo
Overcourt	Bisley, Bisley-with-Lypiatt, Stroud	Cruck House	14th century	28 June 1960	SO9029705936; 51°45′07″N 2°08′31″W	1303296	Upload Photo
Poor Souls' Light in the Churchyard approx. 12m South West of Church of All Saints	Bisley, Bisley-with-Lypiatt, Stroud	Poor Souls Light	Late 13th century	28 June 1960	SO9034705918; 51°45′07″N 2°08′28″W	1091286	Upload Photo
Rectory Farmhouse and Rectory Cottage	Bisley, Bisley-with-Lypiatt, Stroud	Farmhouse	Late 17th century	28 June 1960	SO9047305846; 51°45′04″N 2°08′22″W	1091270	Upload Photo
Soloman's Court with Barn and Shelter Shed	Bournes Green, Bisley-with-Lypiatt, Stroud	House	Early 17th century	28 June 1960	SO9079703750; 51°43′57″N 2°08′05″W	1155213	Upload Photo
Sydenhams	Sydenhams, Bisley-with-Lypiatt, Stroud	Farmhouse	Early 17th century	28 June 1960	SO8973607819; 51°46′08″N 2°09′01″W	1155892	Upload Photo
The Bear Inn	Bisley, Bisley-with-Lypiatt, Stroud	Assembly Rooms	Early 17th century	28 June 1960	SO9031506054; 51°45′11″N 2°08′30″W	1091261	The Bear Inn More images
The Mansion	Bisley, Bisley-with-Lypiatt, Stroud	Detached house	Part 17th century	28 June 1960	SO9027805602; 51°44′57″N 2°08′32″W	1155471	Upload Photo
Througham Court	Througham, Bisley-with-Lypiatt, Stroud	Detached house	Early 17th century	28 June 1960	SO9207807915; 51°46′11″N 2°06′58″W	1091244	Througham Court More images
Througham Slad Farmhouse including 2 walled Courtyards with Gate Pier	Bisley-with-Lypiatt, Stroud	Farmhouse	Mid-late 16th century	28 June 1960	SO9224806559; 51°45′28″N 2°06′49″W	1340339	Througham Slad Farmhouse including 2 walled Courtyards with Gate Pier
Waterlane House	Waterlane, Bisley-with-Lypiatt, Stroud	Detached House	17th century	1 November 1973	SO9231704938; 51°44′35″N 2°06′46″W	1091247	Upload Photo
Brookthorpe Court	Brookthorpe, Brookthorpe-with-Whaddon, Stroud	Country house	Late 16th century	10 January 1955	SO8352512291; 51°48′32″N 2°14′25″W	1304418	Upload Photo
Church of St Margaret	Whaddon, Brookthorpe-with-Whaddon, Stroud	Parish Church	13th century	10 January 1955	SO8332613677; 51°49′17″N 2°14′36″W	1340595	Church of St Margaret More images
Church of St Swithun	Brookthorpe, Brookthorpe-with-Whaddon, Stroud	Parish Church	13th century	10 January 1955	SO8350612266; 51°48′32″N 2°14′26″W	1340597	Church of St Swithun More images
Ebley Mill	Cainscross, Stroud	Boiler House	1862	14 August 1967	SO8293104613; 51°44′24″N 2°14′55″W	1223361	Ebley Mill More images
Group of 12 Phillimore Memorials South East of South Porch of Parish Church of St George	Cam, Stroud	Altar Tomb	18th century	26 April 1984	ST7573999324; 51°41′32″N 2°21′09″W	1340963	Upload Photo
Group of 7 Memorials, including Trotman and Turner, located 3m North of North Wall of North Aisle of Parish Church	Cam, Stroud	Chest Tomb	Early 17th century	26 April 1984	ST7572999354; 51°41′33″N 2°21′09″W	1306101	Upload Photo
Quarry Farmhouse	The Quarry, Cam, Stroud	Farmhouse	17th century	23 June 1983	ST7382499480; 51°41′36″N 2°22′48″W	1340555	Upload Photo
Steps House	Lower Cam, Cam, Stroud	House	Late C16-early 17th century	23 June 1983	SO7466900645; 51°42′14″N 2°22′05″W	1170505	Steps House
Upper Knapp Farmhouse	Lower Cam, Cam, Stroud	Farmhouse	16th century	23 June 1983	SO7458600403; 51°42′06″N 2°22′09″W	1090913	Upload Photo
Chalford Place	Chalford, Stroud	Detached House	Mid-16th century	28 June 1960	SO8918602473; 51°43′15″N 2°09′29″W	1171410	Upload Photo
Church of St John the Baptist	France Lynch, Chalford, Stroud	Anglican Church	1855-7	24 March 1988	SO9014103114; 51°43′36″N 2°08′39″W	1305658	Church of St John the Baptist More images
The Leigh	Far Green, Coaley, Stroud	Farmhouse	17th century	26 April 1984	SO7823000632; 51°42′14″N 2°18′59″W	1090924	Upload Photo
Church of St James	Cranham, Stroud	Parish Church	12th century	28 June 1960	SO8910812410; 51°48′37″N 2°09′34″W	1156148	Church of St James More images
Kingshill House	Dursley, Stroud	Country house	1705	23 June 1952	ST7526899034; 51°41′22″N 2°21′33″W	1219989	Upload Photo
Raglan House	Dursley, Stroud	Row House	early-mid 18th century	23 June 1952	ST7580698219; 51°40′56″N 2°21′05″W	1290869	Raglan House More images
Town Hall	Dursley, Stroud	Town Hall	1738	23 June 1952	ST7561998124; 51°40′53″N 2°21′15″W	1220689	Town Hall More images
Alkerton Farmhouse	Eastington, Stroud	Farmhouse	C20	9 December 1986	SO7751205172; 51°44′41″N 2°19′38″W	1152797	Upload Photo
Church of St Michael and Angels	Churchend, Eastington, Stroud	Anglican Church	14th century	10 January 1955	SO7827105767; 51°45′01″N 2°18′58″W	1152811	Church of St Michael and Angels More images
Nastend House	Nastend, Eastington, Stroud	House	Late 16th century	9 December 1986	SO7903406189; 51°45′14″N 2°18′18″W	1090556	Upload Photo
Elmore Court	Elmore Village, Elmore, Stroud	Country house	1564-1588	10 January 1955	SO7828515333; 51°50′10″N 2°19′00″W	1090810	Elmore Court More images
Gateway to South of Elmore Court	Elmore Village, Elmore, Stroud	Gate	Early 18th century	10 January 1955	SO7828715192; 51°50′06″N 2°18′59″W	1340625	Gateway to South of Elmore Court
Monument to Arthur Knowles in the Churchyard approx. 9m South of South Porch to Church of St John	Elmore, Stroud	Chest Tomb	1707	30 September 1985	SO7672014898; 51°49′56″N 2°20′21″W	1153809	Upload Photo
Barn at Tanhouse Farm, about 60m North East of Church End House	Church End, Frampton on Severn, Stroud	Cruck House	1688	9 December 1986	SO7447106876; 51°45′36″N 2°22′17″W	1090531	Barn at Tanhouse Farm, about 60m North East of Church End House More images
Church of St Mary the Virgin	Church End, Frampton on Severn, Stroud	Anglican Church	14th century	10 January 1955	SO7434806940; 51°45′38″N 2°22′23″W	1153176	Church of St Mary the Virgin More images
Gatepiers and Gates to Frampton Court	Frampton on Severn, Stroud	Gate	Mid-18th century	10 January 1955	SO7536707920; 51°46′10″N 2°21′30″W	1090541	Upload Photo
Church of St James	Saul, Fretherne with Saul, Stroud	Anglican Church	1140	10 January 1955	SO7491109320; 51°46′55″N 2°21′54″W	1090510	Church of St James More images
Church of St Mary	Fretherne, Fretherne with Saul, Stroud	Gate	13th century	10 January 1955	SO7337209157; 51°46′50″N 2°23′15″W	1154542	Church of St Mary More images
Frocester Court	Frocester, Stroud	House	18th century	10 January 1955	SO7873502930; 51°43′29″N 2°18′33″W	1091169	Frocester Court More images
Church of All Saints	Stone, Ham and Stone, Stroud	Church	13th century	30 March 1960	ST6843795456; 51°39′25″N 2°27′28″W	1274801	Church of All Saints More images
Manor Farmhouse and Gatepiers	Breadstone, Hamfallow, Stroud	Farmhouse	Medieval	21 October 1952	SO7146201282; 51°42′34″N 2°24′52″W	1274485	Upload Photo
Hardwicke Court	Hardwicke, Stroud	Country house	1817-19	10 January 1955	SO7878611712; 51°48′13″N 2°18′33″W	1090815	Hardwicke Court More images
Smith Monument in the Churchyard approx. 4m north of North Chapel to Church of St Nicholas	Hardwicke, Stroud	Chest Tomb	1675	30 September 1985	SO7936212446; 51°48′37″N 2°18′03″W	1154188	Upload Photo
Church of St John the Baptist	Harescombe, Stroud	Bell Tower	13th century	10 January 1955	SO8373710416; 51°47′32″N 2°14′14″W	1154223	Church of St John the Baptist More images
Hilles House and Terraced Gardens	Harescombe, Stroud	Country house	1914-1939	10 January 1955	SO8513012105; 51°48′27″N 2°13′01″W	1090823	Upload Photo
Mulberry Tree Hall and Garden Wall	Brookthorpe, Harescombe, Stroud	Detached House	Late 16th century or early 17th century	10 January 1955	SO8393012039; 51°48′24″N 2°14′04″W	1154432	Upload Photo
3 unidentified Monuments, about 25m north-west of Tower in Churchyard of Church of St Peter	Haresfield Village, Haresfield, Stroud	Chest Tomb	Early 18th century	9 December 1986	SO8097410446; 51°47′32″N 2°16′38″W	1303492	Upload Photo
Church of St Peter	Haresfield Village, Haresfield, Stroud	Anglican Church	12th century	10 January 1955	SO8099610421; 51°47′32″N 2°16′37″W	1090521	Church of St Peter More images
Harris, Four Niblett and Two unidentified Monuments, about 6m north of End of East Chancel in Churchyard of Church of St Peter	Haresfield Village, Haresfield, Stroud	Chest Tomb	Mid/late 17th century	9 December 1986	SO8102010425; 51°47′32″N 2°16′36″W	1090525	Upload Photo
Three unidentified Monuments, about 3m immediately East of Church Porch in Churchyard of Church of St Peter	Haresfield Village, Haresfield, Stroud	Chest Tomb	Late 17th century	9 December 1986	SO8100310410; 51°47′31″N 2°16′37″W	1091319	Upload Photo
Two unidentified Monuments, about 2m North East of Chancel in Churchyard of Church of St Peter	Haresfield Village, Haresfield, Stroud	Chest Tomb	Late 17th century	9 December 1986	SO8102610422; 51°47′32″N 2°16′35″W	1155236	Upload Photo
Burden Court Farmhouse and Gate Piers 10m to South West	Tresham, Hillesley and Tresham, Stroud	Farmhouse	Mid-late 17th century	17 September 1952	ST7959291002; 51°37′03″N 2°17′46″W	1129383	Upload Photo
Holwell Farmhouse	Ozleworth Bottom, Hillesley and Tresham, Stroud	Farmhouse	c. 1700	25 January 1978	ST7931392437; 51°37′49″N 2°18′01″W	1320842	Upload Photo
Barton End Hall and Barton End House	Barton End, Horsley, Stroud	House	Mid-17th century	24 March 1988	ST8467698118; 51°40′54″N 2°13′23″W	1171722	Upload Photo
Church of St Martin	Horsley, Stroud	Anglican Church	1838-9	28 June 1960	ST8379598018; 51°40′50″N 2°14′09″W	1305420	Church of St Martin More images
Group of 2 Monuments in the Churchyard Approx. 10m East of Chancel of St Martin	Horsley, Stroud	Tomb	Late 18th century and early 19th century	24 March 1988	ST8382398019; 51°40′51″N 2°14′07″W	1305400	Upload Photo
Unidentified Monument in the Churchyard approx. 20m south of South Transept to Church of St Martin	Horsley, Stroud	Chest Tomb	Early-mid 18th century	24 March 1988	ST8380697983; 51°40′49″N 2°14′08″W	1091142	Upload Photo
Court Farmhouse	King's Stanley, Stroud	Farmhouse	15th century	28 June 1960	SO8147403276; 51°43′40″N 2°16′11″W	1340638	Upload Photo
Court House to North West of Court Farmhouse	King's Stanley, Stroud	Prison	Mid-18th century	28 June 1960	SO8145003290; 51°43′41″N 2°16′12″W	1305424	Upload Photo
Lych Gate to south of Church of All Saints	Selsley West, King's Stanley, Stroud	Lych Gate	1862	24 February 1987	SO8295603735; 51°43′55″N 2°14′54″W	1305606	Lych Gate to south of Church of All Saints More images
Old Castle House	King's Stanley, Stroud	House	1563	28 June 1960	SO8099803266; 51°43′40″N 2°16′35″W	1340639	Upload Photo
Former Mill Building at New Mills, west of Bushford Bridge	Kingswood, Stroud	Industrial Building	1985	23 June 1952	ST7375292971; 51°38′06″N 2°22′50″W	1238004	Former Mill Building at New Mills, west of Bushford Bridge More images
New Inn House and Railings	Kingswood, Kingswood, Stroud	Abbey	c. 1495	9 September 1985	ST7465692088; 51°37′37″N 2°22′03″W	1238215	Upload Photo
Former Saxon Church to west of Priory House and approx 10m South West of Church of St. Swithun	Leonard Stanley, Stroud	Barn	Saxon	28 June 1960	SO8020103245; 51°43′39″N 2°17′17″W	1171503	Upload Photo
Priory House	Leonard Stanley, Stroud	Farmhouse	Early to mid-17th century	28 June 1960	SO8023903234; 51°43′39″N 2°17′15″W	1090735	Upload Photo
The Mercers House, the Weavers Cottage and Vine Cottage	Leonard Stanley, Stroud	Cruck House	15th century	28 June 1960	SO8024603396; 51°43′44″N 2°17′15″W	1090701	Upload Photo
Doris's Cottage	Epney, Longney and Epney, Stroud	Hall House	15th century	9 December 1986	SO7638311229; 51°47′57″N 2°20′38″W	1155549	Upload Photo
Pack Monument in the Churchyard approx 3m west of Monument to Sarah Howsen; west of Church of St Lawrence	Longney Village, Longney and Epney, Stroud	Chest Tomb	Early 18th century	30 September 1985	SO7635712428; 51°48′36″N 2°20′40″W	1090798	Upload Photo
Arden House and Arden Cottage	Minchinhampton Town, Minchinhampton, Stroud	House	Early 16th century	28 June 1960	SO8720400735; 51°42′19″N 2°11′12″W	1091107	Upload Photo
Dunkirk Manor	Theescombe, Minchinhampton, Stroud	House	c. 1800	30 May 1951	SO8463700635; 51°42′15″N 2°13′25″W	1109670	Upload Photo
Former Wool Stove at Bourne Mills	Minchinhampton, Stroud	Wool Stove	Early 19th century	31 August 1988	SO8723902103; 51°43′03″N 2°11′10″W	1248837	Upload Photo
Gatcombe Park	Minchinhampton, Stroud	Country house	1771-74	28 June 1960	ST8809499410; 51°41′36″N 2°10′25″W	1091099	Gatcombe Park More images
Greylands including Railings	Minchinhampton Town, Minchinhampton, Stroud	Town House	c. 1740	28 June 1960	SO8718800714; 51°42′18″N 2°11′12″W	1340462	Upload Photo
Market House	Minchinhampton Town, Minchinhampton, Stroud	Market House	1698	28 June 1960	SO8725600749; 51°42′19″N 2°11′09″W	1340484	Market House More images
Old Mill Building at Longfords Mills	Avening Valley, Minchinhampton, Stroud	Mill	1865	24 March 1988	ST8666799211; 51°41′29″N 2°11′39″W	1305339	Old Mill Building at Longfords Mills
Seynckley House including Courtyard Walls	Minchinhampton, Stroud	Detached House	Late 15th century	28 June 1960	SO8431301912; 51°42′57″N 2°13′42″W	1340457	Upload Photo
St Marys House, Wing Cottage and Ivy Cottage	Minchinhampton, Stroud	House	Late 17th century	28 June 1960	SO8863602195; 51°43′06″N 2°09′57″W	1091156	Upload Photo
The Lammas	Minchinhampton Town, Minchinhampton, Stroud	Detached House	c. 1800	28 June 1960	SO8708400627; 51°42′15″N 2°11′18″W	1091088	Upload Photo
Unidentified Monument in the Churchyard approx. 7m South West of South Transept to Church of the Holy Trinity	Minchinhampton Town, Minchinhampton, Stroud	Tomb	Mid-18th century	24 March 1988	SO8722100790; 51°42′21″N 2°11′11″W	1340468	Upload Photo
Church of St Andrew	Miserden Village, Miserden, Stroud	Parish Church	Mid-late 11th century	28 June 1960	SO9362308935; 51°46′45″N 2°05′38″W	1091221	Church of St Andrew More images
Hazel Manor	Miserden, Stroud	Country house	c. 1680	28 June 1960	SO9136609827; 51°47′13″N 2°07′36″W	1091257	Upload Photo
Miserden Park	Miserden Village, Miserden, Stroud	Country house	c. 1620	28 June 1960	SO9409208928; 51°46′44″N 2°05′13″W	1091226	Upload Photo
Wishanger Farmhouse	Wishanger, Miserden, Stroud	House	Mid-late 16th century	28 June 1960	SO9207809478; 51°47′02″N 2°06′58″W	1091227	Upload Photo
Bannut Tree Chapel	Nailsworth, Stroud	House	Late 19th century	30 May 1951	ST8511399653; 51°41′44″N 2°13′00″W	1299054	Upload Photo
Bannut Tree House	Nailsworth, Stroud	Priests House	16th century	30 May 1951	ST8510199663; 51°41′44″N 2°13′01″W	1120871	Upload Photo
Egypt House	Nailsworth, Stroud	House	1698	17 July 1980	ST8493899896; 51°41′51″N 2°13′10″W	1186726	Upload Photo
Egypt Mill	Nailsworth, Stroud	Mill	14th century	17 July 1980	ST8494699882; 51°41′51″N 2°13′09″W	1120895	Egypt Mill More images
L-shaped Range of Buildings to Dunkirk Mills	Nailsworth, Stroud	Mill	1741	10 March 1977	SO8446000562; 51°42′13″N 2°13′35″W	1120862	Upload Photo
Spring Hill Court	Nailsworth, Stroud	House	1680	30 May 1951	ST8478799775; 51°41′47″N 2°13′17″W	1186715	Upload Photo
Spring Hill House	Nailsworth, Stroud	House	c. 1672	30 May 1951	ST8481899747; 51°41′47″N 2°13′16″W	1186714	Upload Photo
Stokes Croft	Nailsworth, Stroud	House	Earlier origin	30 May 1951	ST8483699497; 51°41′38″N 2°13′15″W	1186686	Upload Photo
The Oaklands Farmhouse	Inchbrook, Nailsworth, Stroud	Farmhouse	c1730's-c1740's	12 April 1979	SO8412000803; 51°42′21″N 2°13′52″W	1186694	Upload Photo
Church of St Martin	North Nibley, Stroud	Church	19th century	30 June 1961	ST7355796096; 51°39′47″N 2°23′01″W	1221018	Church of St Martin More images
Doric Temple and Steps to Lakeside Pool	Stancombe Park, North Nibley, Stroud	Summerhouse	c. 1860	1 December 1986	ST7390996864; 51°40′12″N 2°22′43″W	1210685	Doric Temple and Steps to Lakeside Pool More images
Nibley House	North Nibley, Stroud	Country house	Mid-17th century	23 June 1952	ST7375495969; 51°39′43″N 2°22′51″W	1210641	Nibley House More images
Old Bournstream House	North Nibley, Stroud	Detached House	Late 16th century	23 June 1952	ST7485994438; 51°38′53″N 2°21′53″W	1220982	Upload Photo
Tyndale Monument with Railed Surround	North Nibley, Stroud	Tower	1866	13 April 1984	ST7432195628; 51°39′32″N 2°22′21″W	1220938	Tyndale Monument with Railed Surround More images
Unidentified Monument in the Churchyard approx. 7m north of Vestry to Church of St Martin	North Nibley, Stroud	Chest Tomb	Mid-18th century	1 December 1986	ST7357496112; 51°39′47″N 2°23′00″W	1221046	Upload Photo
Church of St Bartholomew	Nympsfield, Stroud	Anglican Church	1861-63	30 June 1961	SO8009700251; 51°42′02″N 2°17′22″W	1091052	Church of St Bartholomew More images
Barn and attached Outbuildings at Tocknell's Court	Painswick, Stroud	Barn	Early 18th century	24 August 1990	SO8809611875; 51°48′19″N 2°10′27″W	1091043	Upload Photo
Brownshill Court	Painswick, Stroud	Apartment	1955	21 October 1955	SO8561107289; 51°45′51″N 2°12′36″W	1091567	Upload Photo
Cardynham	Tibbiwell Lane, Painswick, Stroud	Row House	16th century	21 October 1955	SO8676709701; 51°47′09″N 2°11′36″W	1091019	Cardynham More images
Castle Godwyn	Painswick, Stroud	Country house	Early to mid-18th century	21 October 1955	SO8709311649; 51°48′12″N 2°11′19″W	1305033	Upload Photo
Dover Cottage & Dover House	Painswick, Stroud	House	1955	21 October 1955	SO8698209748; 51°47′10″N 2°11′24″W	1340217	Dover Cottage & Dover House
Four Monuments in Churchyard circa 20m north of the north-east Corner of the Church of St Mary	Painswick, Stroud	Gravestone	18th century	24 August 1990	SO8666809676; 51°47′08″N 2°11′41″W	1340541	Upload Photo
Group of 8 Packer and Other Monuments in the Churchyard circa 12 to 25m South of North Gate to the Church of St Mary	Painswick, Stroud	Tomb	1733	24 August 1990	SO8666209686; 51°47′08″N 2°11′41″W	1090962	Upload Photo
Group of Eight Monuments circa 12m east of East Chancel Wall in the Churchyard of the Church of St Mary	Painswick, Stroud	Gravestone	Late 17th century	24 August 1990	SO8669209651; 51°47′07″N 2°11′40″W	1153228	Upload Photo
Holcombe House	Holcombe, Painswick, Stroud	Country house	C16/C17	21 October 1955	SO8578911554; 51°48′09″N 2°12′27″W	1152444	Holcombe House More images
John Bryan Monument circa 25m in the Churchyard south-east of Lych Gate to the Church of St Mary	Churchyard of St Mary's, Painswick, Stroud	Commemorative Monument	1787	24 August 1990	SO8660309618; 51°47′06″N 2°11′44″W	1340527	John Bryan Monument circa 25m in the Churchyard south-east of Lych Gate to the Church of St Mary More images
Loveday and unidentified Monuments circa 5m east of East Chancel Wall in the Churchyard of the Church of St Mary	Painswick, Stroud	Gravestone	Early 17th century	24 August 1990	SO8668809645; 51°47′07″N 2°11′40″W	1090966	Upload Photo
Millers House	Painswick, Stroud	Row House	17th century	21 October 1955	SO8679709768; 51°47′11″N 2°11′34″W	1091049	Upload Photo
New Hall	Painswick, Stroud	House	15th century	24 August 1990	SO8675309816; 51°47′13″N 2°11′36″W	1151979	New Hall More images
Gothic seat circa 150m south west of Painswick House	Painswick, Stroud	Loggia	c. 1750	24 August 1990	SO8618810379; 51°47′31″N 2°12′06″W	1153492	Gothic seat circa 150m south west of Painswick House More images
Pigeon House at Painswick House	Painswick, Stroud	Dovecote	Mid-18th century	24 August 1990	SO8630210301; 51°47′28″N 2°12′00″W	1090941	Pigeon House at Painswick House More images
Ram House circa 30m south-east of Plunge Pool, Painswick House	Painswick, Stroud	House	c. 1750	24 August 1990	SO8627110536; 51°47′36″N 2°12′02″W	1090944	Upload Photo
Eagle House circa 25m west of the Stables at Painswick House	Painswick, Stroud	Garden Building	c. 1750	24 August 1990	SO8635510522; 51°47′35″N 2°11′57″W	1340532	Eagle House circa 25m west of the Stables at Painswick House More images
Spring Head and Pool circa 150m west of the Stables, Painswick House	Painswick, Stroud	Trough	c. 1750	24 August 1990	SO8624910560; 51°47′37″N 2°12′03″W	1304279	Upload Photo
Statue of Pan circa 35m south-east of the Stables, Painswick House	Painswick, Stroud	Statue	Mid-18th century	24 August 1990	SO8643410499; 51°47′35″N 2°11′53″W	1153446	Statue of Pan circa 35m south-east of the Stables, Painswick House
The Red House circa 150m north of the Stables, Painswick House	Painswick, Stroud	Garden Building	c. 1750	24 August 1990	SO8642610665; 51°47′40″N 2°11′54″W	1304275	The Red House circa 150m north of the Stables, Painswick House More images
Urn circa 30m west of Stable Block at Painswick House	Painswick, Stroud	Urn	18th century	24 August 1990	SO8634810506; 51°47′35″N 2°11′58″W	1304306	Urn circa 30m west of Stable Block at Painswick House
Urn circa 6m South of South East Corner of Painswick House	Painswick, Stroud	Urn	18th century	24 August 1990	SO8634610450; 51°47′33″N 2°11′58″W	1340530	Upload Photo
Classical Seat circa 150m north-west of the Stables, Painswick House	Painswick, Stroud	Garden seat	c. 1750	24 August 1990	SO8629710642; 51°47′39″N 2°12′00″W	1340531	Upload Photo
Well Head circa 35m south-west of the Classical Seat, Painswick House	Painswick, Stroud	Well Head	c. 1750	24 August 1990	SO8627610618; 51°47′39″N 2°12′01″W	1090943	Upload Photo
The Cottage & Wick Street House	Painswick, Stroud	Detached house	1633	21 October 1955	SO8612007639; 51°46′02″N 2°12′09″W	1223902	Upload Photo
The Gables	Painswick, Stroud	House	16th century	21 October 1955	SO8673409726; 51°47′10″N 2°11′37″W	1152180	The Gables
The Post Office and the Beehive	Painswick, Stroud	Row	16th century	21 October 1955	SO8666709768; 51°47′11″N 2°11′41″W	1152581	The Post Office and the Beehive More images
The Sheephouse	Painswick, Stroud	Farmhouse	Early 17th century	21 October 1955	SO8591308529; 51°46′31″N 2°12′20″W	1091042	The Sheephouse More images
Tocknells Court	Painswick, Stroud	Country house	c. 1570	21 October 1955	SO8813011885; 51°48′20″N 2°10′25″W	1340504	Upload Photo
Well Farmhouse	Painswick, Stroud	Farmhouse	Mid-17th century	21 October 1955	SO8651007928; 51°46′12″N 2°11′49″W	1267087	Upload Photo
Yew Tree House	Painswick, Stroud	Detached House	1670	21 October 1955	SO8695509728; 51°47′10″N 2°11′26″W	1340199	Yew Tree House More images
Group of 9 Monuments in the Churchyard adjacent to South Side of Nave and Chancel to Church of St John the Baptist	Pitchcombe, Stroud	Sarcophagus	1846	24 March 1987	SO8515808249; 51°46′22″N 2°12′59″W	1302874	Upload Photo
Pitchcombe House	Pitchcombe Village, Pitchcombe, Stroud	Country house	c. 1740	28 June 1960	SO8491008076; 51°46′16″N 2°13′12″W	1340411	Pitchcombe House More images
More Hall Convent	Randwick, Stroud	Courtyard House	1582	28 June 1960	SO8300706090; 51°45′12″N 2°14′51″W	1340392	More Hall Convent
Church of St Mary Magdalene; Gates and Wall on West and North Sides of Churchyard	Rodborough, Rodborough, Stroud	Church	Mid-19th century	1 May 1951	SO8432804413; 51°44′18″N 2°13′42″W	1340958	Church of St Mary Magdalene; Gates and Wall on West and North Sides of Churchyard More images
Dudbridge House	Dudbridge, Rodborough, Stroud	House	Mid-18th century	5 April 1973	SO8349904389; 51°44′17″N 2°14′25″W	1267466	Dudbridge House
Garth	Rodborough, Rodborough, Stroud	House	17th century	1 May 1951	SO8445004073; 51°44′07″N 2°13′36″W	1239609	Upload Photo
Sunnyside	Rodborough, Rodborough, Stroud	House	17th century	1 May 1951	SO8443904051; 51°44′06″N 2°13′36″W	1273622	Upload Photo
Vale View	Rodborough, Rodborough, Stroud	House	17th century	1 May 1951	SO8445204059; 51°44′06″N 2°13′36″W	1273594	Upload Photo
47 Kingscourt Lane	Rodborough, Rodborough, Stroud	House	17th century	1 May 1951	SO8443604030; 51°44′05″N 2°13′36″W	1239680	Upload Photo
Unidentified Chest Tomb circa 2.5m south of South Tower Wall, at Church of St John the Evangelist	Slimbridge, Stroud	Chest Tomb	late C17-early 18th century	26 April 1984	SO7402603556; 51°43′48″N 2°22′39″W	1340551	Upload Photo
Unidentified Chest Tomb circa 5m east of South Porch Door of Church of St John the Evangelist	Slimbridge, Stroud	Chest Tomb	Early 18th century	26 April 1984	SO7403903549; 51°43′48″N 2°22′38″W	1090899	Upload Photo
Almory Gateway or Gatehouse	Standish Village, Standish, Stroud	Gate	14th century	10 January 1955	SO8001808439; 51°46′27″N 2°17′28″W	1303211	Almory Gateway or Gatehouse More images
Niblett Monument, about 3m east of Dowdeswell Monument in Churchyard of Church of St Nicholas	Standish Village, Standish, Stroud	Chest Tomb	1676	9 December 1986	SO8008608427; 51°46′27″N 2°17′24″W	1340370	Upload Photo
Church of St Cyr	Stinchcombe, Stroud	Parish Church	15th century	30 June 1961	ST7296598865; 51°41′16″N 2°23′33″W	1340554	Church of St Cyr More images
Drakestones House and attached Stable Block and Walls	Stinchcombe, Stroud	House	1911	26 April 1984	ST7344797789; 51°40′42″N 2°23′08″W	1340581	Upload Photo
Joseph Hicks Chest Tomb, 2.5m north of North Porch Entrance to Church of St Cyr	Stinchcombe, Stroud	Chest Tomb	1739	26 April 1984	ST7296398876; 51°41′17″N 2°23′33″W	1090907	Upload Photo
Joseph Hicks Chest Tomb, circa 4m north of North Porch Entrance to Church of St Cyr	Stinchcombe, Stroud	Chest Tomb	1728	26 April 1984	ST7296298878; 51°41′17″N 2°23′33″W	1305726	Upload Photo
Melksham Court	Stinchcombe, Stroud	Manor House	16th century	23 June 1952	ST7348798712; 51°41′12″N 2°23′06″W	1171311	Upload Photo
Piers Court	Stinchcombe, Stroud	House	16th century	2 June 1952	ST7332198737; 51°41′12″N 2°23′14″W	1305626	Upload Photo
Unidentified Chest Tomb circa 5.5m north of North Porch Entrance to Church of St Cyr	Stinchcombe, Stroud	Chest Tomb	Early 18th century	26 April 1984	ST7296198880; 51°41′17″N 2°23′33″W	1090908	Upload Photo
William Bendall Chest Tomb circa 8m north-east of Porch to Church of St Cyr	Stinchcombe, Stroud	Chest Tomb	Mid-18th century	26 April 1984	ST7296498880; 51°41′17″N 2°23′33″W	1171187	Upload Photo
Church of St Cyr	Stonehouse, Stroud	Parish Church	14th century	28 June 1960	SO7994905013; 51°44′36″N 2°17′31″W	1340646	Church of St Cyr More images
Group of 12 Monuments in the Churchyard approx between 5 and 20m to north of Porch to Church of St Cyr	Stonehouse, Stroud	Chest Tomb	1653	24 February 1987	SO7995605033; 51°44′37″N 2°17′30″W	1305404	Upload Photo
Stonehouse Court Hotel	Stonehouse, Stroud	Country house	1601	28 June 1960	SO7990805099; 51°44′39″N 2°17′33″W	1340682	Stonehouse Court Hotel More images
Archway, formerly to Farm Hill Park	Paganhill, Stroud, Stroud	Arch	1834	1 May 1951	SO8379205764; 51°45′01″N 2°14′10″W	1274282	Archway, formerly to Farm Hill Park More images
Church of St Laurence	Stroud, Stroud	Bell Tower	14th century	1 May 1951	SO8522605274; 51°44′45″N 2°12′55″W	1267652	Church of St Laurence More images
Lodgemoor Mills Office Block	Stroud, Stroud	Mill	17th century	1 May 1951	SO8434005008; 51°44′37″N 2°13′42″W	1239615	Lodgemoor Mills Office Block More images
Railway Goods Shed and Offices	Stroud, Stroud	Goods Shed	c. 1845	30 June 1989	SO8508205022; 51°44′37″N 2°13′03″W	1267258	Railway Goods Shed and Offices More images
Slade House	Stroud, Stroud	House	Early to mid-18th century	1 May 1951	SO8649305573; 51°44′55″N 2°11′49″W	1267454	Upload Photo
The Fields	Stroud, Stroud	House	17th century	1 May 1951	SO8583304806; 51°44′30″N 2°12′24″W	1090092	Upload Photo
Town Hall	Stroud, Stroud	Town Hall	1596	25 June 1974	SO8522505229; 51°44′44″N 2°12′55″W	1267688	Town Hall More images
Angeston Grange	Uley, Stroud	House	Early 19th century	26 April 1984	ST7816998106; 51°40′53″N 2°19′02″W	1171418	Upload Photo
Bencombe House	Uley, Stroud	Clothiers House	Early 18th century	23 June 1952	ST7921997563; 51°40′35″N 2°18′07″W	1171515	Upload Photo
Church of St Giles	Uley, Stroud	Parish Church	1857-1858	30 June 1961	ST7912398570; 51°41′08″N 2°18′12″W	1090858	Church of St Giles More images
Coombe House	Uley, Stroud	Clothiers House	1728	23 June 1952	ST7847097965; 51°40′48″N 2°18′46″W	1171443	Upload Photo
Dimery Tomb circa 11m south-west of South West Corner, at Church of St Giles	Uley, Stroud	Altar Tomb	Early 19th century	26 April 1984	ST7910298559; 51°41′07″N 2°18′13″W	1172079	Upload Photo
Stoutshill	Uley, Stroud	House	1952	23 June 1952	ST7871297770; 51°40′42″N 2°18′33″W	1340605	Upload Photo
Uley Lodge	Uley, Stroud	Clothiers House	1612	23 June 1952	ST7919898735; 51°41′13″N 2°18′08″W	1090888	Upload Photo
Unidentified Chest Tomb circa 10m west of South West Corner, at Church of St Giles	Uley, Stroud	Chest Tomb	Early 18th century	26 April 1984	ST7910298565; 51°41′08″N 2°18′13″W	1172072	Upload Photo
Unidentified Memorial, circa 7m south-west of South West Corner at Church of St Giles	Uley, Stroud	Tomb	1672	26 April 1984	ST7910498559; 51°41′07″N 2°18′13″W	1305283	Upload Photo
Wresden Farmhouse, Mill and attached Barn	Uley, Stroud	Farmhouse	1984	23 June 1952	ST7721698027; 51°40′50″N 2°19′51″W	1340583	Upload Photo
49, The Street	Uley, Stroud	Clothiers House	17th century	30 June 1961	ST7895398438; 51°41′03″N 2°18′21″W	1090857	Upload Photo
Barn to North West of Manor Farmhouse	Upton St. Leonards, Stroud	Stable	Late 17th century	10 January 1955	SO8710914132; 51°49′32″N 2°11′18″W	1090745	Upload Photo
Church of St Leonard	Upton St. Leonards, Stroud	Parish Church	Late 13th century	10 January 1955	SO8621614943; 51°49′59″N 2°12′05″W	1154810	Church of St Leonard More images
Monument to Richard Ockold in the Churchyard approx 3m south of South Aisle to Church of St Leonard	Upton St. Leonards, Stroud	Chest Tomb	1689	30 September 1985	SO8619414938; 51°49′58″N 2°12′06″W	1154902	Upload Photo
Monument to Richard Ockold in the Churchyard approx 4.5m south of South Aisle to Church of St Leonard	Upton St. Leonards, Stroud	Chest Tomb	1657	30 September 1985	SO8619214935; 51°49′58″N 2°12′06″W	1247880	Upload Photo
Church of St Andrew	Wheatenhurst, Whitminster, Stroud	Anglican Church	14th century	10 January 1955	SO7603009069; 51°46′47″N 2°20′56″W	1303052	Church of St Andrew More images
Whitminster House	Wheatenhurst, Whitminster, Stroud	Country house	1867	10 January 1955	SO7597409050; 51°46′47″N 2°20′59″W	1156110	Upload Photo
Atcombe Court	South Woodchester, Woodchester, Stroud	Country house	Late 17th century	28 June 1960	SO8373301720; 51°42′50″N 2°14′13″W	1340672	Upload Photo
Church of St Mary	North Woodchester, Woodchester, Stroud	Parish Church	1863-1864	24 February 1987	SO8397902670; 51°43′21″N 2°14′00″W	1090669	Church of St Mary More images
Rooksmoor House	Woodchester, Stroud	House	Mid-16th century	28 June 1960	SO8422203167; 51°43′37″N 2°13′47″W	1090718	Upload Photo
Southfield House	Woodchester, Stroud	Detached House	Late 16th century	28 June 1960	SO8418702559; 51°43′18″N 2°13′49″W	1172364	Upload Photo
Woodchester House	Woodchester, Stroud	Country house	Mid-18th century	28 June 1960	SO8392602376; 51°43′12″N 2°14′03″W	1090664	Upload Photo
Bradley Court	Wotton-under-Edge, Stroud	Manor House	1568	23 June 1952	ST7456593720; 51°38′30″N 2°22′08″W	1341521	Upload Photo
Royal Oak	Wotton-under-Edge, Stroud	Inn	17th century	23 June 1952	ST7552293320; 51°38′17″N 2°21′18″W	1088922	Royal Oak More images
The Ancient Ram Inn	Wotton-under-Edge, Stroud	First Floor Hall House	Late Medieval	23 June 1952	ST7601893299; 51°38′17″N 2°20′53″W	1088885	The Ancient Ram Inn More images
The Court	Wotton-under-Edge, Stroud	House	Early 18th century	16 August 1984	ST7593893380; 51°38′19″N 2°20′57″W	1088914	Upload Photo
Wortley House	Wortley, Wotton-under-Edge, Stroud	Kitchen	Early 18th century	16 August 1984	ST7657691796; 51°37′28″N 2°20′23″W	1341598	Upload Photo
13 Market Street	Wotton-under-Edge, Stroud	Timber-framed house	16th century or earlier	23 June 1952	ST7559393256; 51°38′15″N 2°21′15″W	1088870	Upload Photo
