= Fretherne with Saul =

- Civil parish
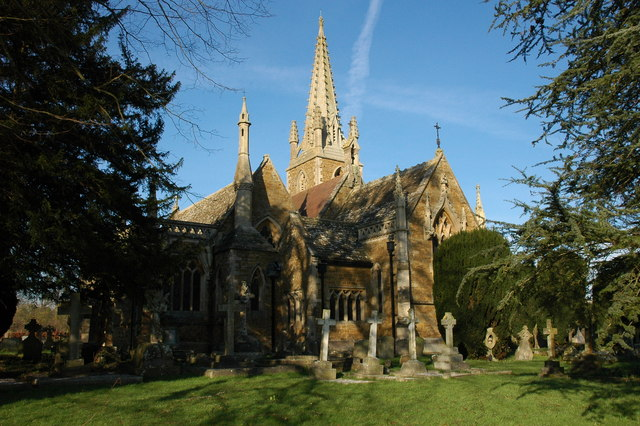
- Fretherne Church.

- Location within Gloucestershire
- Coordinates: 51.78°N 2.37°W
- Country: England
- Primary council: Stroud
- County: Gloucestershire
- Region: South West England
- Status: Parish
- Main settlements: Fretherne, Saul, Upper Framilode

Government
  - Type: Parish Council
  - UK Parliament: Stroud

Population (2011)
  - Total: 701
- Postal code: GL2 7
- Area code: GL

Fretherne with Saul is a civil parish in the Stroud district of Gloucestershire, England. It includes the villages of Framilode, Fretherne, Saul and Upper Framilode.

Watercourses form a significant portion of the parish boundaries: on two sides is the River Severn, which forms the boundary with the parishes of Westbury-on-Severn to the north and Awre to the south-west, both being in the Forest of Dean; and the Gloucester and Sharpness Canal forms the boundary with the parish of Whitminster to the east, and the major portion of the boundary with the parish of Frampton-on-Severn to the south-east. The land boundaries are with the parishes of Arlingham to the west and north-west; Frampton-on-Severn to the south; and Longney and Epney to the north-east.

The parish is crossed by the River Frome, which flows into the Severn at Upper Framilode. The only major road in the parish is the B4071, which connects Saul to the A38.

The parish was formed in 1884 from the separate parishes of Fretherne and Saul, and from five detached parts of the parish of Eastington which lay within the parishes of Fretherne and Saul.
