= Edward Birchall =

Edward Birchall may refer to:

- Edward Birchall (1839–1903), architect at Kelly & Birchall, an architectural practice in Leeds, England
- Edward Vivian Birchall (1884–1916), English philanthropist
