= St Margaret's Church, Whaddon =

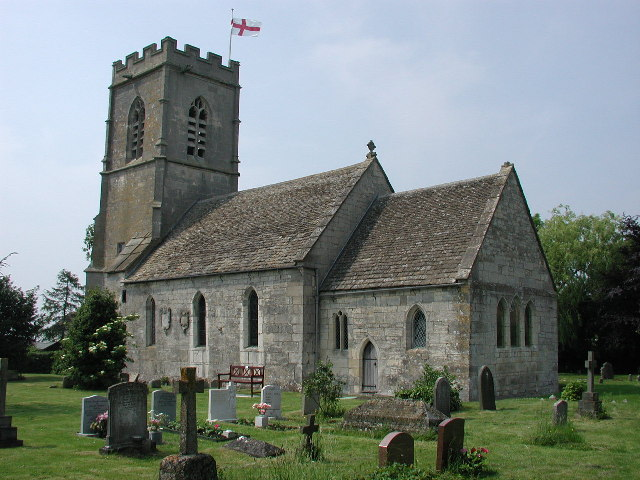

- Location in Gloucestershire
- 51.8215°N 2.2433°W
- OS grid reference: SO833136
- Location: Whaddon, Gloucestershire
- Country: England
- Denomination: Church of England

History
- Dedication: Saint Margaret

Architecture
- Heritage designation: Grade II*
- Designated: 10 January 1955
- Architectural type: Church
- Style: English Gothic architecture
- Groundbreaking: 13th century

Specifications
- Capacity: 120
- Materials: Limestone

St Margaret's Church is a 13th-century Church of England church in the village of Whaddon, Gloucestershire, England. It has been a grade II* listed building since 10 January 1955. The church tower is a dominant feature within the surrounding flat area.

== History ==
St Margaret's church was founded in the 13th century. Nothing was known about the church until at least 1315, when it was re-dedicated to St Margaret of Scotland.

St Margaret's church was originally part of the Morton Valence and Whaddon civil parish, so it became known as the chapel of Moreton. The link was broken in 1840 when Whaddon was united with Brookthorpe. Until 1540, the parishes of Moreton and Whaddon were part of the Diocese of Worcester, becoming part of the new Diocese of Gloucester thereafter. They were jointly served as before until 1784, when they were separated following a dispute over presentation to the living. In 1840, a new vicarage was built in Brookthorpe, with which parish, Whaddon, was held until 1970.

The nave and chancel belong to the 13th century and the tower to the 15th century. The church was completely restored in 1855 with the exception of the chancel, which was later restored in 1880 by the Ecclasiastical Commissioners. The original barrel ceiling of the nave and the plastered finish of the walls were left untouched.

The tower once contained five bells, but now only two remain within it. The treble was re-cast in 1971 by John Taylor & Co, the second is by Abel Rudhall of Gloucester in 1752.

The organ was built by John Snetzler, and dates from 1768. It was in St Swithun's Church from 1938 to 1997. Regular services ceased there, and the organ was moved to St Margaret's. It has seven stops, mostly of original pipe work. The pipes were re-gilded by Ursula Falconer of Uley. The case is made out of mahogany, with some restrained Rococo detailing.

There is a three-light window at the East end of the church made in 1920 by Sir Ninian Comper. In the centre God is shown as a beardless youth, St Margaret of Scotland is shown in the north light, and St George in the south.

== Architecture ==
The church of St. Margaret is an ancient building of stone, consisting of chancel, nave without aisles, north porch, and an embattled ashlar tower to the west containing three bells. Most of the windows are plain lancets, that is, with pointed heads but no tracery. It has a stone slate roof. The present tower was added during the 15th century. There is a moulded and pointed arched north doorway with carved head labels to hoodmould, the door itself is plank wood from the 19th century.

The porch has moulded 4-centred archway in parapet gable with diagonal corner buttresses with small chamfered square-headed side windows; these were restored in the 19th century. There are two plain chamfered English Gothic architecture nave lancets to left of the porch. There are three lancets on the north and south nave walls, with 18th century wall memorials positioned between them.

The parapet has an east end gable to the nave and to the chancel with an English gothic triplet east window.

The chancel has two windows in north and south walls, the eastern being a single English gothic lancet window. The wide pointed chancel arch has chamfered archivolt supported on plain corbels with recessed undersides, the chancel floor has been raised in the 19th century with a step at the arch and before the altar. The roof is timber panelled. There is a restored shouldered-arched piscina in the south chancel wall.

The diagonal offset buttresses next to the three stage tower have heavy plinth moulding broken by a pointed-arched west doorway, a 19th-century restored two-light window on the west side and small chamfered square-headed opening next to the middle stage on the north and south sides. There are 2-light belfry openings with rectilinear tracery and stone slate louvres. The buttresses at belfry level are clasping and the east pair are terminated above the nave roof with carved corbels. There is a string course above with a single remaining carved animal gargoyle in east and west tower faces. Additionally there is a crenellated parapet.

The nave has a continuous rounded string course at sill level and timber ribbed barrel roof with brattished wall-plate. There is a round-headed tower arch with a 19th-century timber vestry screen below. A blocked square-headed doorway to left of the tower arch gives internal access to the tower stairs.

Inside the nave is a 14th-century stone octagonal font with round-headed panelling around the bowl and heavy mouldings below, all sitting on a panelled pedestal. There is a large Royal Arms of George III above the tower arch which is curved in shape, it was thoroughly cleaned in 1993. A shouldered-arched doorway leads to a square stair-turret with stone steps for the tower, it is decorated with raking coped top projects flush with nave wall. The arched priest's doorway is pointed in shape with a plank door central to the south wall, with a two-light window to the left having quatrefoil tracery head in a square opening, and a small ogee-headed lancet to right in the north chancel wall. There is a plain black marble memorial over the door. There are box pews in the nave and an octagonal stone pulpit with arcaded top and base both dating from the 19th century. The interior walls were scraped and partially re-plastered in the 19th century restorations.
