= Percy Ford =

Percy Ford may refer to:

- Percy Ford (cricketer) (1877–1920), an English cricketer
- Percy Ford (racing driver) (1888–1962), an American racing driver
