= Brookthorpe-with-Whaddon =

Civil parish in Gloucestershire, England

Coordinates: 51.808°N 2.237°W

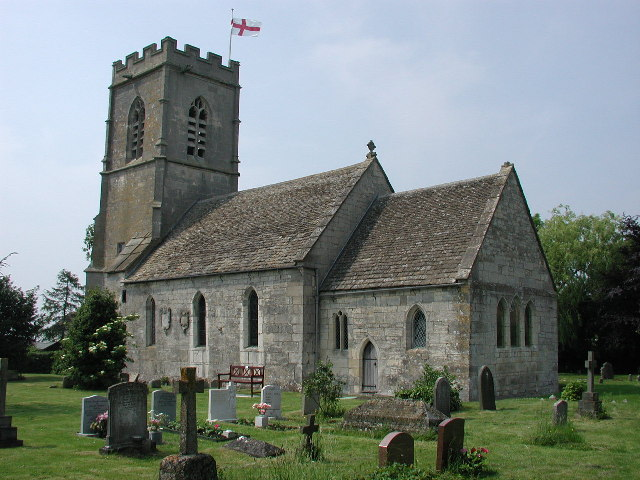
- Saint Margaret's Church, Whaddon

- Location within Gloucestershire
- Population: 322 (2011)
- OS grid reference: SO837121
- Civil parish: Brookthorpe-with-Whaddon
- District: Stroud
- Shire county: Gloucestershire
- Region: South West
- Country: England
- Sovereign state: United Kingdom
- Post town: Gloucester
- Postcode district: GL4
- Dialling code: 01452
- Police: Gloucestershire
- Fire: Gloucestershire
- Ambulance: South Western
- UK Parliament: Stroud

Brookthorpe-with-Whaddon, formerly just Brookthorpe, is a civil parish in the Stroud district of Gloucestershire, England. According to the 2001 census it had a population of 308, increasing to 322 at the 2011 census. In 2019 the population was estimated at 395. It consists of the small villages of Brookthorpe and Whaddon, both to the south of Gloucester.

Whaddon is almost contiguous with the Gloucester suburb of Tuffley, while Brookthorpe is 1 mile (1.6 km) farther south, on the other side of the M5 motorway and close to the escarpment of the Cotswold hills.

To the north of the parish is the unparished area of the City of Gloucester. Parishes adjoining Brookthorpe-with-Whaddon are: Upton St Leonards to the north-east; Painswick to the east; Harescombe to the south; Haresfield to the south-west; and Quedgeley to the west. The last is in Gloucester district, the others are in Stroud district.

== History ==
On 1 April 1935 the parish of Whaddon was merged with Brookthorpe, on 3 July 1956 the parish was renamed "Brookthorpe with Whaddon".
