= Percy Ford (cricketer) =

English cricketer

Personal information
- Born: 5 July 1877; Wheatenhurst, Gloucestershire
- Died: 2 December 1920 (aged 43); Gloucester
- Batting: Right-handed

Domestic team information
- Years: Team
- 1906-1908: Gloucestershire
- Source: Cricinfo, 30 March 2014

Percy Ford (5 July 1877 – 2 December 1920) was an English cricketer. He played for Gloucestershire between 1906 and 1908.
