= Old Town Hall, Stroud =

Municipal building in Stroud, Gloucestershire, England

Old Town Hall
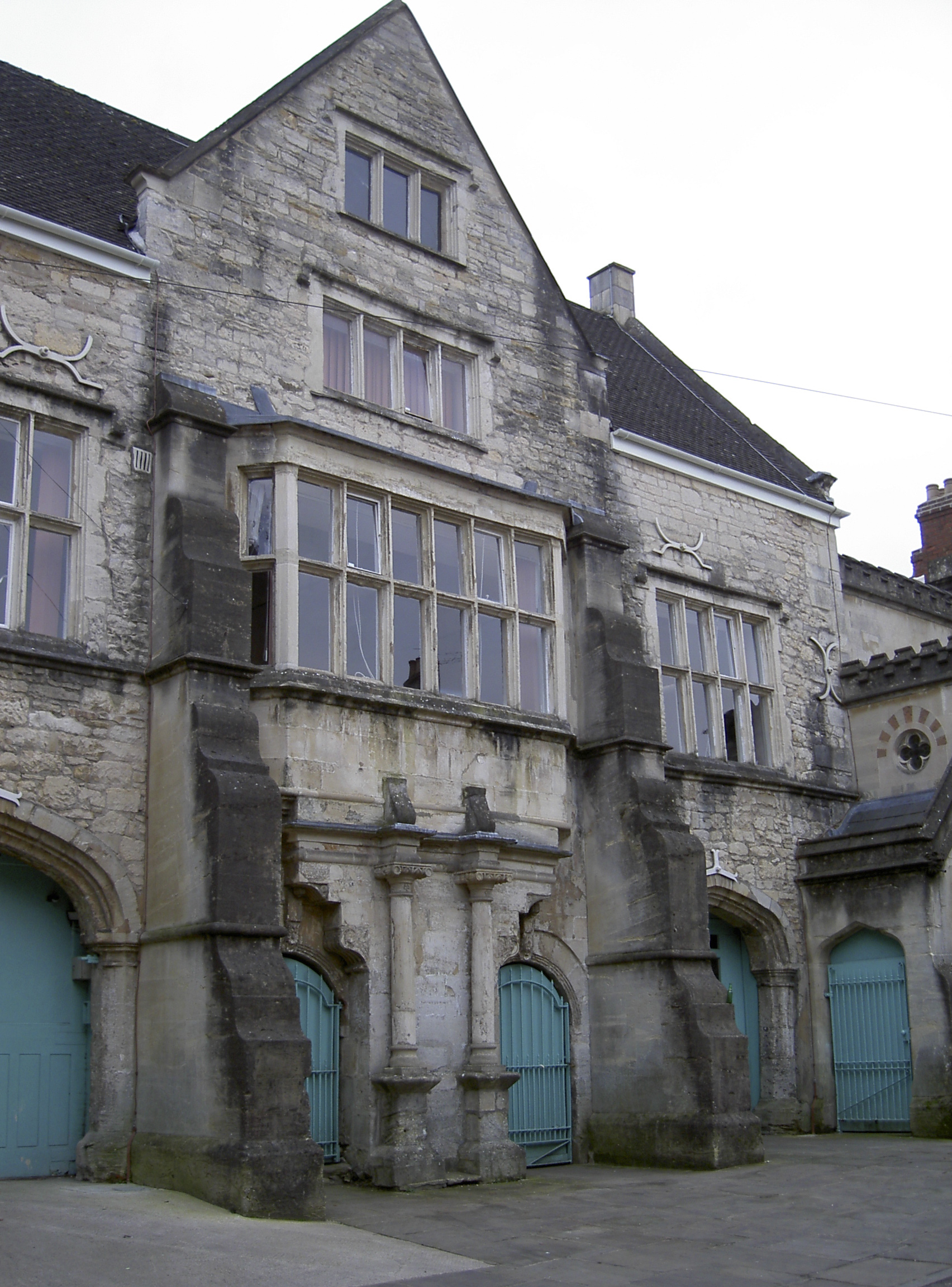
- Old Town Hall, Stroud

- Shown in Gloucestershire
- 51.7454°N 2.2157°W
- Location: The Shambles, Stroud

History
- Built: 1596

Site notes
- Architectural style: Gothic style

Listed Building – Grade II*
- Official name: Town Hall
- Designated: 25 June 1974
- Reference no.: 1267688

The Old Town Hall is a municipal building in The Shambles, Stroud, Gloucestershire, England. The town hall, which was the headquarters of Stroud Urban District Council, is a Grade II* listed building.

== History ==
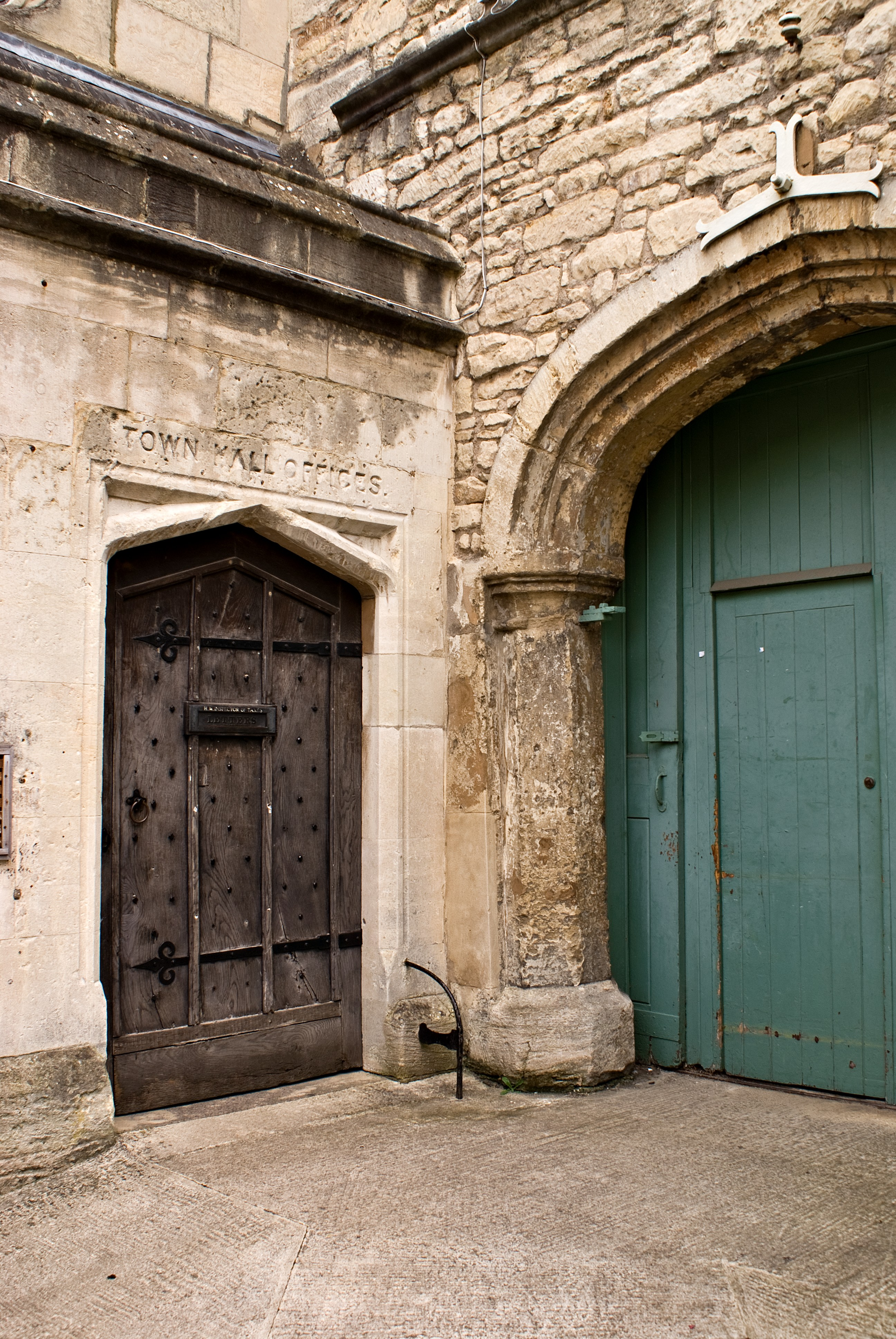
The doorway to the offices

Following the granting of a charter to hold markets in 1594, the lord of the manor at Over Lypiatt, John Throckmorton, decided to commission a market hall; the new building was designed in the neoclassical style and completed in 1596. The original design involved a symmetrical main frontage with four bays facing onto the Market Place; it was arcaded on the ground floor to allow markets to be held; an assembly room with a large oriel window was established on the first floor.

A village lock-up was created in the basement of the building in the 17th century and a school was established on the first floor of the building in the early 18th century: the physicist, John Canton, attended the school at that time. Part of the building was converted into a tailor's spinning house in the late 18th century.

The building was first used for municipal purposes as a meeting place for the local vestry in the early 19th century. It was extended to a design by Francis Niblett to accommodate the county court in 1851 and, after becoming the offices of the local board of health, it was remodelled in the gothic style with a large gable containing mullion windows erected above the two central bays in 1856. In order to improve the stability of the building, large buttresses, flanking the two central bays, were installed on the front of the building in 1890. After significant population growth, partly associated with the number of dye works in the town, the area became an urban district with the town hall as its headquarters in 1894.

Following an increase in the responsibilities of the council, civic leaders acquired the former offices of the Gloucester Banking Company in the High Street in 1930; the High Street building was converted for municipal use and was subsequently referred to as the "Council Chambers". Although most council officers and their departments moved to the new Council Chambers in the High Street, some departments, including the technical services department, remained in the old building. The old town hall remained in municipal use even after the enlarged Stroud District Council was formed in 1974. However, in 1986, the council acquired Ebley Mill, once the largest mills of its type in the south west of England, with a view to converting it for office use for council officers and their departments. Following the preparation of a feasibility study, a programme of improvement works was implemented at the town hall after the council moved out in 1988.

Wall hangings created to commemorate the 400th anniversary of the granting of a charter to the town were completed in 1994 and subsequently hung in the building.

== See also ==
- Grade II* listed buildings in Stroud (district)
