= Elver Eating World Championships =

Annual eating competition, England

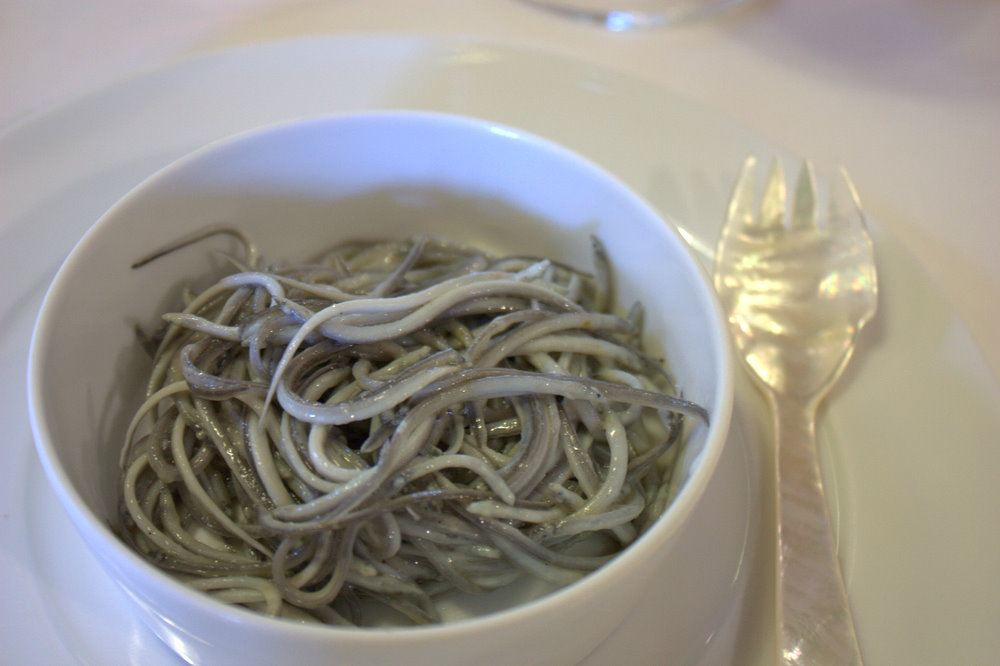
A bowl of cooked elvers (in Spain)

The Elver Eating World Championships are held annually in Frampton on Severn in Gloucestershire, England. Elvers of the European eel were historically an important foodstuff in the Severn Valley and their annual arrival in the river was celebrated. At Frampton this celebration turned into a competitive eating contest on the village green. By the 1970s this was billed as the National Elver Eating Competition. The competition had ended by 1990 as elvers became scarcer. The competition was revived in 2015 as the Elver Eating World Championships, though elvers are no longer eaten, being replaced by elver-shaped surimi. The winners are those that can eat a portion of food in the shortest amount of time. Men eat 1 pound (0.45 kg) of surimi, women eat 0.5 pounds (0.23 kg) and children eat spaghetti.

== Background ==
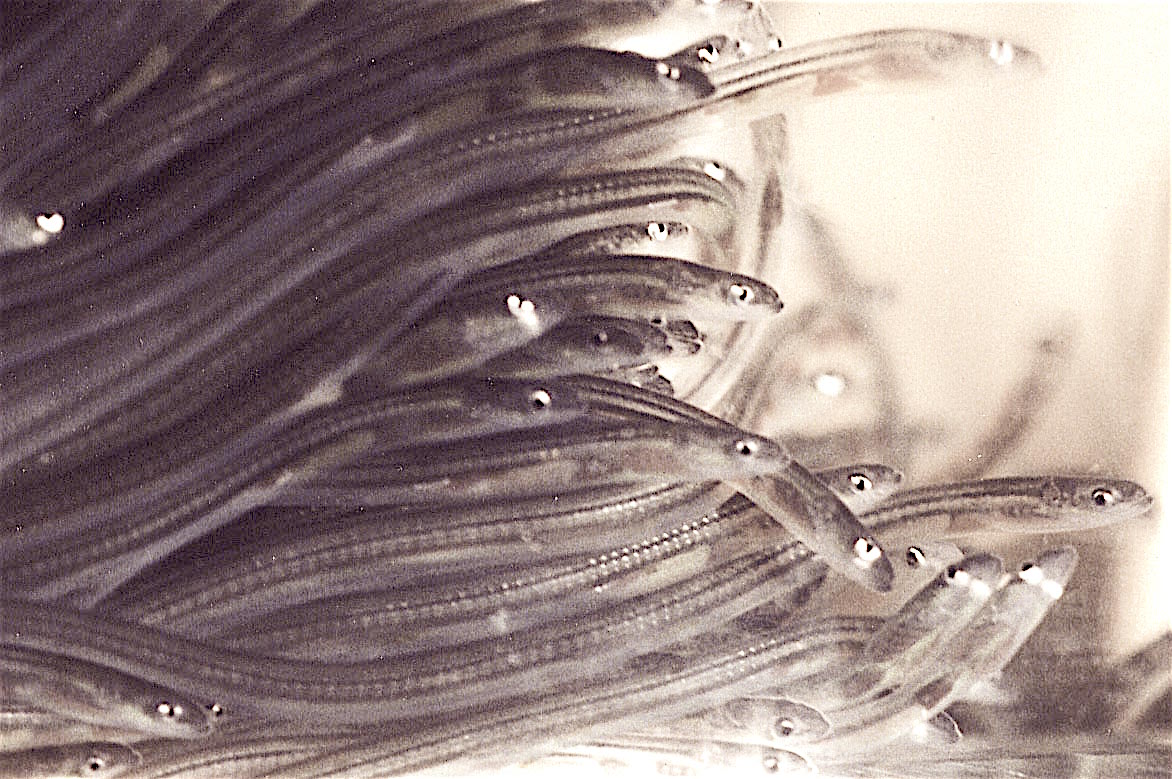
Live elvers

Elvers, juvenile European eels, were historically an important foodstuff in the Severn Valley. They arrive from the spawning grounds in the Sargasso Sea every springtime, often carried upstream with the assistance of the Severn bore. They were caught in great quantities and were prized by locals as a freely available source of food. The traditional method of cooking was to fry them alive, which turns the glassy fish white.

The supply of elvers was an important issue for settlements all along the river, with upstream villages complaining that the elvers had been fished before they reached them. The taking of elvers in the lower Severn was banned in 1874, leading to local frustration against the Severn Fisheries Board and a debate in parliament.

== National competition ==
At Frampton on Severn in Gloucestershire the celebration of the annual arrival of the elvers became a competitive eating contest on the village green. The elvers would be fried in bacon fat on an open fire and the winner would be the man that ate 1 pound (0.45 kg) of elvers, around 1,000 fish, in the shortest time. The record was 43 seconds, which had been set on 13 April 1971 by a local farmer whose portion that year was estimated at 900 elvers. By the 1970s the contest had become known as the National Elver Eating Competition. A contest for women, with 0.5 pounds (0.23 kg) of fish being consumed, was established in 1973.

A Gloucestershire Gazette article from 2019 states that the competition was abandoned in the 1970s due to declining elver numbers, but the New York Times records a competition in 1983. Kay (2019), in a book on Gloucestershire food and drink, states that the event was cancelled in the 1980s, though Wöbse and Kupper (2021) in a work on environmental protection, state 1990 was the last event.

== World championships ==
In recent years River Severn elver numbers have recovered, though they are subject to increased environmental protection measures and the fish are very expensive. The catch is often sold for upwards of £200 per 1 kilogram (2.2 lb) or taken to the Netherlands to be grown to maturity and released into the wild to restock rivers.

Elvers were also a popular foodstuff in the Basque Country in Spain. Since 1991 a Spanish company has produced imitation elvers, known in Spanish as La Gula del Norte ("The Gluttony of the North") and in English as el-vers, from surimi fish paste. The fish used include Alaskan pollock and Pacific whiting. An eating contest with the el-vers was trialed at the 2014 Frampton Country Show, held at Frampton Court and attracting around 14,000 attendees. The event was well received and since 2015 the Elver Eating World Championships have been held on an annual basis (excluding the period interrupted by the COVID-19 pandemic) at the fair, on the Early May bank holiday. As with the trial event, actual elvers are not eaten, the surimi-based product being used instead. As well as the traditional competitions for men and women, a competition for children, using spaghetti, is held.
