= Frampton Pools =

Protected area in Gloucestershire, England

- Site of Special Scientific Interest
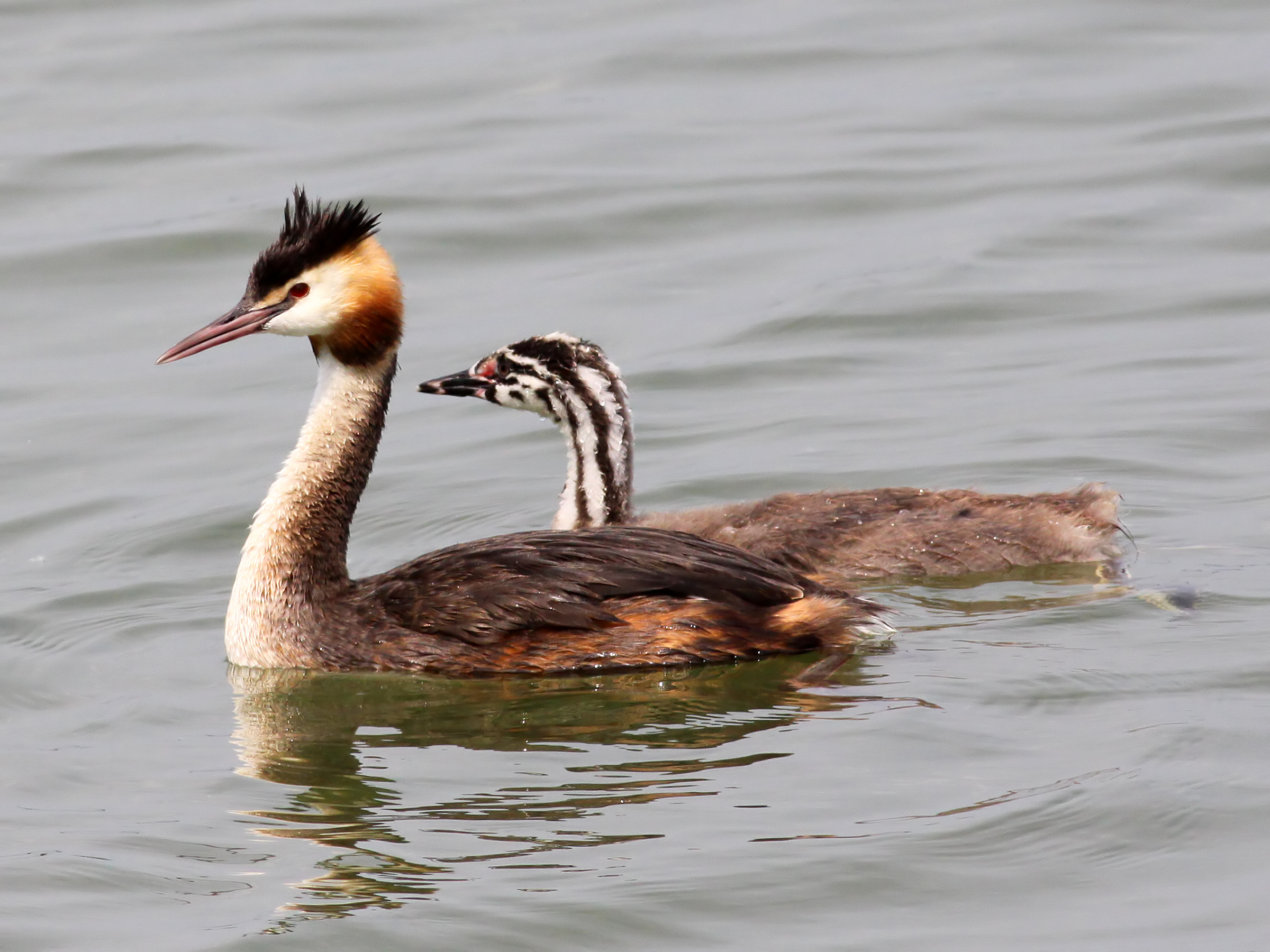
- Great crested grebe with young (Podiceps cristatus)

- Location within Gloucestershire
- Location of Frampton Pools.
- Area of search: Gloucestershire
- Grid reference: SO753073
- Coordinates: 51.764283°N 2.358584°W
- Interest: Biological
- Area: 59.84 ha (147.9 acres)
- Notification date: 1974

Frampton Pools (grid reference SO753073) is a 59.84-hectare (147.9-acre) biological Site of Special Scientific Interest in Gloucestershire, notified in 1974. The pools are on the edge of the village of Frampton on Severn.

The site is in the Severn Vale and consists of a number of lakes created as a result of gravel extraction. These provide a good open water habitat which is important for wintering wildfowl. The site is mostly standing water which is surrounded by broadleaved woodland, scrub and the margins support marginal vegetation. The larger, deeper northern pit has steep banks and is often subjected to disturbance by sailing, the southern pit is smaller and shallower with well-vegetated banks and is less disturbed. The northern pool is known as Court Lake and has an area of thirty-nine point nine hectares (99 acres) and the southern pool is called Townsfield Lake and has an area of twenty point seven hectares (51 acres). In 2009 funding was secured to improve the conservation condition of the site through the Aggregates Levy Sustainability Fund.

== Species ==
The over-wintering birds include large numbers of mallard, teal, shoveler, pochard, tufted duck and pintail. Rarer species also visit such as smew and scaup. The lakes are used as a breeding area for tufted duck, mallard and great crested grebe. The vegetation around the pools can hold wintering Eurasian siskin, lesser redpoll and common chiffchaff, while in the breeding season the site has held European turtle dove, common nightingale, Eurasian reed warbler, little egret and common kingfisher.

It is a good area for invertebrates, notably dragonflies.

== Fishing ==
Coarse fishing is permitted at Frampton Pools.

== SSSI sources ==
- Natural England SSSI information on the citation
- Natural England SSSI information on the Frampton Pools units
