= Dursley Town Hall =

Municipal building in Dursley, Gloucestershire, England

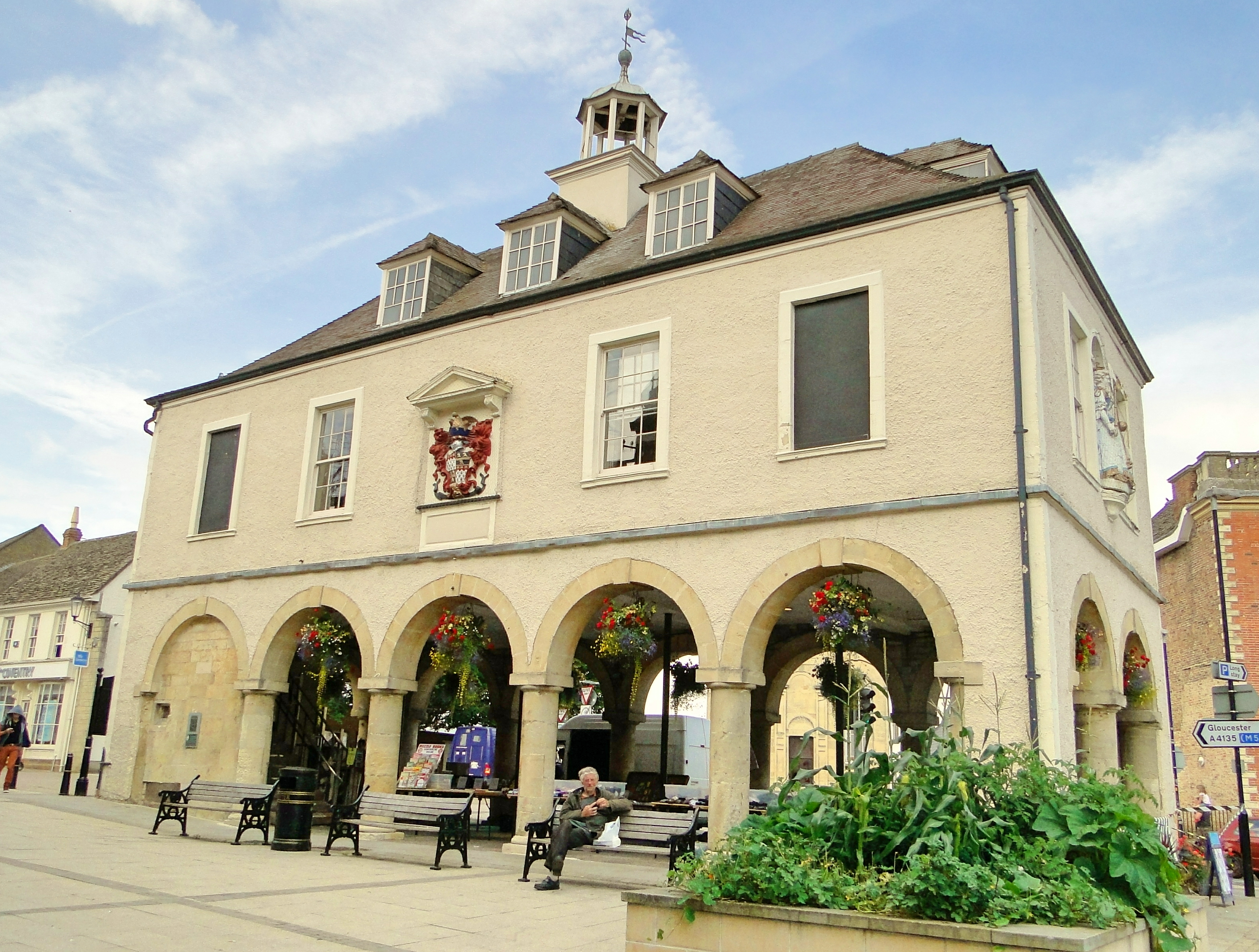
- Dursley Town Hall

- Shown in Gloucestershire
- 51.6813°N 2.3540°W
- Location: Market Place, Dursley

History
- Built: 1738

Site notes
- Architectural style: Neoclassical style

Listed Building – Grade II*
- Official name: Town Hall
- Designated: 23 June 1952
- Reference no.: 1220689

Dursley Town Hall, also known as Dursley Market Hall, is a municipal building in the Market Place, Dursley, Gloucestershire, England. The structure, which is mainly used for markets and community events, is a Grade II* listed building.

== History ==
The right to hold markets in Dursley was granted by King Henry VIII to the lord of the manor, Nickolas Wykes, in November 1528. For many centuries the market took the form of a series of stalls erected in the Market Place until the 1730s when the then lord of the manor, Thomas Estcourt, (Note: There were at least five people named Thomas Estcourt who served as lord of the manor: this one died in 1746.) decided to erect a combined market hall and town hall.

The new building was designed in the neoclassical style, built with a roughcast surface and stone dressings and was completed in 1738. It was arcaded on the ground floor, so that markets could be held, with an assembly hall for civic meetings on the first floor. The design involved a symmetrical main frontage with five bays facing onto the south side of the Market Place: on the first floor there was an elaborate coat of arms of the Estcourt family in a central position flanked by a pair of sash windows and, in the outer bays, a pair of blind windows. At roof level there were two dormer windows and an octagonal cupola with a square base and a finial and weather vane above. On the east elevation there were two sash windows and, between them, a niche containing a statue of Queen Anne who had contributed £500 towards the restoration of the tower of the Church of St James the Great in Dursley. There was originally an external staircase to the assembly room with a lock-up for petty criminals underneath. Internally, the principal room was the assembly room which was capable of accommodating 80 people.

In 1840, the local solicitor and benefactor, Henry Vizard, purchased both the building and the right to hold markets from the then lord of the manor, Thomas Grimston Bucknall Estcourt and then, in December 1841, assigned them to seven trustees appointed on behalf of the town. The market ceased to levy charges on the stall holders in December 1849. The external staircase was demolished and replaced by an internal staircase in a partitioned off area on the ground floor in 1863.

The borough council, which had met in the town hall, was formally abolished under the Municipal Corporations Act 1883, and the building did not serve any official civic function after Dursley Rural District Council was established with its own council offices in 1894. An extensive programme of restoration works costing some £7,000 was completed in 1966. Ownership of the building, which had previously been vested in trustees, was transferred to Dursley Town Council in January 1996. Despite the change of ownership, the building continued to be used primarily for community events. Works of art in the town hall include a portrait by an unknown artist of the benefactor, Henry Vizard.

== See also ==
- Grade II* listed buildings in Stroud (district)
