= Epney =

Village in Gloucestershire, England

Coordinates: 51.7975°N 2.3447°W

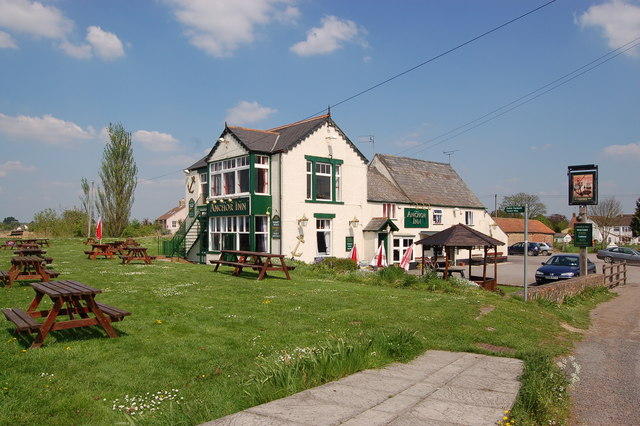
- The Anchor Inn on the River Severn at Epney

- Location within Gloucestershire
- Civil parish: Longney and Epney
- District: Stroud
- Shire county: Gloucestershire
- Region: South West
- Country: England
- Sovereign state: United Kingdom
- Post town: Gloucester
- Postcode district: GL2
- Police: Gloucestershire
- Fire: Gloucestershire
- Ambulance: South Western
- UK Parliament: Stroud

Epney is a small village in the civil parish of Longney and Epney, in the Stroud district, in Gloucestershire, England, on the River Severn, 8 miles (13 km) South-West of Gloucester. It is between Longney and Upper Framilode. The village has a pub called The Anchor Inn.

The hamlet of Epney was first inhabited by the late 13th century, Originally part of the Moreton Valence Parish and has been part of the Framilode ecclesiastical parish since 1855. Since 2002 Epney has been part of the civil parish of Longney and Epney.

The small house known as Doris' Cottage dates from the 15th century and is designated as a Grade II* listed building.
