= St Andrew's Church, Whitminster =

Church in Gloucestershire, England

Coordinates: 51°46′47″N 2°20′56″W

St. Andrew's Church is a parish church in Whitminster, Gloucestershire. The building dates to the 14th century and has been remodeled and expanded several times, from the late 15th to the mid-19th centuries. It is one of only a few churches in Gloucestershire to retain a traditional Stoup, a stone basin used to hold Holy Water. St Andrew's Church has been grade II listed since 1955.

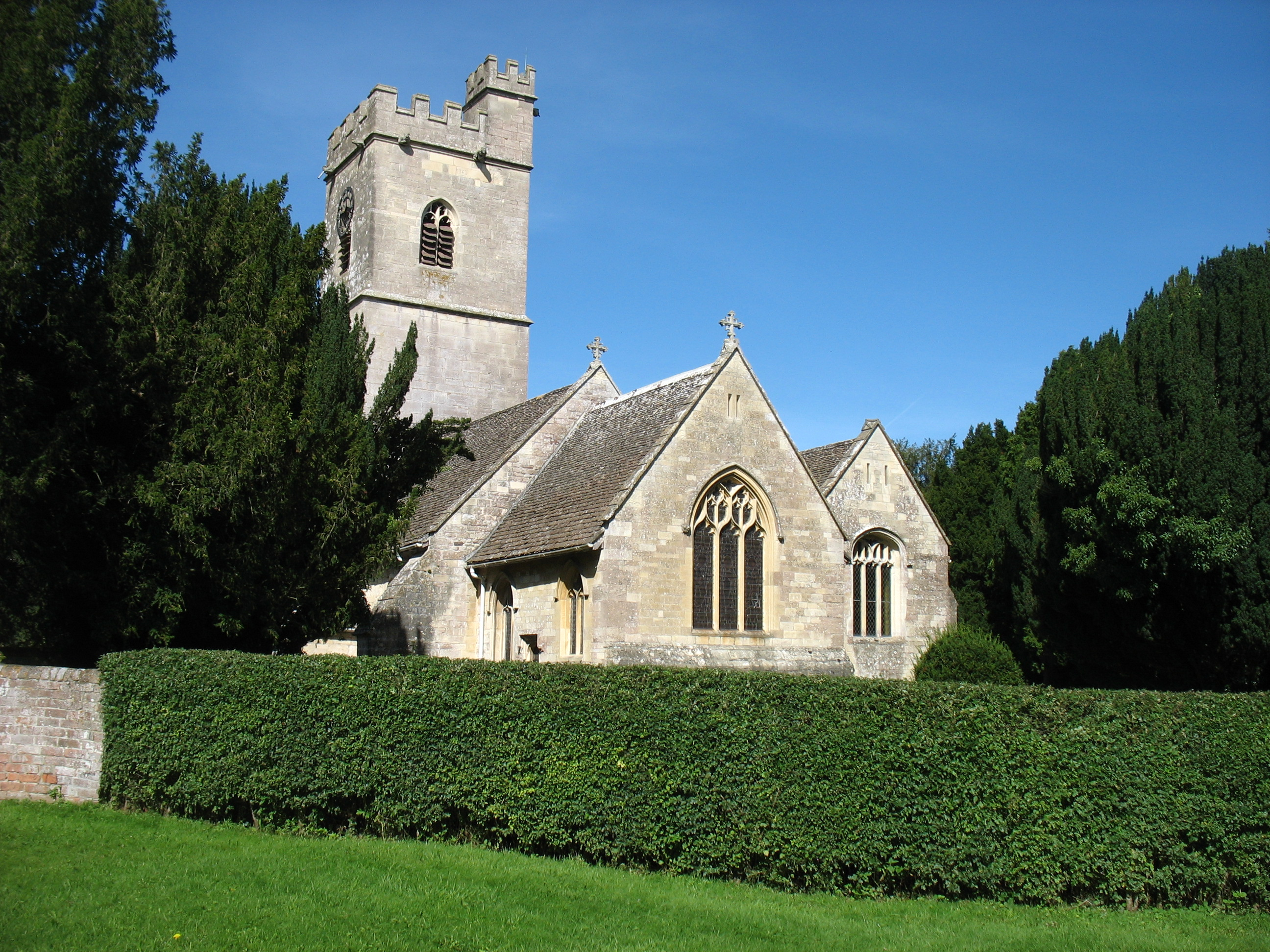
The Church of St. Andrew's, Whitminster

== Description ==
The building was constructed with coursed and dressed stone and the walls are part ashlar. The roof was built of slate.The church was remodeled in the late 15th century, with the addition of a tower. There are several wall monuments and the remains of gilded reredos by Heaton, Butler and Bayne. It currently has a peel of 6 bells, the earliest of which dates from 1634. It is one of only a few churches in Gloucestershire to retain a traditional Stoup, a stone basin used to hold Holy Water.

The parish is part of the Stroudwater Team benefice within the Diocese of Gloucester.

== History ==
The church site dates from 1086, although no part of the surviving fabric is visibly older than the 14th century. The south porch probably dates to the 15th century. The structure was enlarged in 1842 to include a north aisle, designed by Bristol architect Thomas Foster, the tower was restored in 1844 and various other areas in 1884 by Sir A.W. Blomfeld, with the externals remaining mostly unchanged from that date.

St Andrew's Church has been grade II listed since 1955.
