= Haresfield Beacon =

Geological Site of Special Scientific Interest in Gloucestershire, England

- Site of Special Scientific Interest
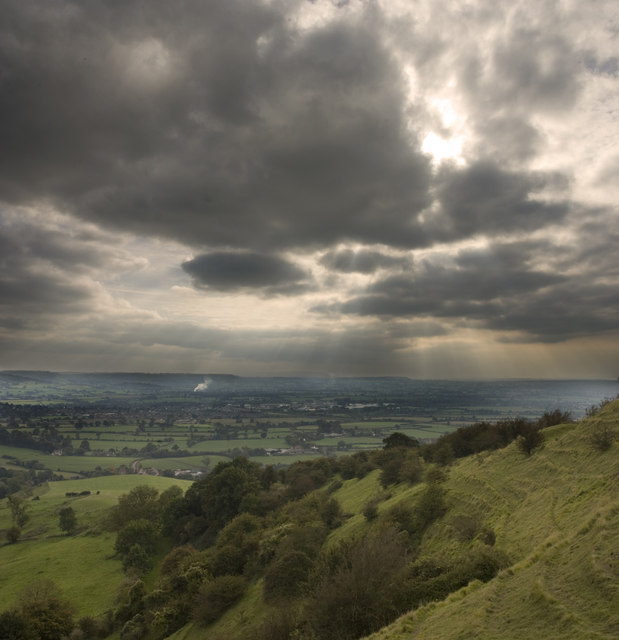
- View from Haresfield Beacon

- Location within Gloucestershire
- Location of Haresfield Beacon.
- Area of search: Gloucestershire
- Grid reference: SO819088
- Coordinates: 51.778022°N 2.263028°W
- Interest: Geological
- Area: 0.73 ha (1.8 acres)
- Notification date: 1985

Haresfield Beacon (grid reference SO819088) is a 0.73-hectare (1.8-acre) geological Site of Special Scientific Interest in Gloucestershire, notified in 1985. The site is listed in the ‘Stroud District’ Local Plan, adopted November 2005, Appendix 6 (online for download) as an SSSI and a Regionally Important Geological Site (RIGS).

== Location and geology ==
The site was formerly called Haresfield Hill and is considered a classic site of significant importance for its Jurassic rocks. The site includes the Cotswold Cephalopod Bed of the Upper Lias, and the scissum Beds of the Inferior Oolite. Its most important significance is the rich fossil fauna exposed for research purposes and dating the succession.

== SSSI Source ==
- Natural England SSSI information on the citation
- Natural England SSSI information on the Haresfield Beacon unit
