= Edward Vivian Birchall =

English philanthropist

- Born: Edward Vivian Dearman Birchall; 10 August 1884
- Died: 10 August 1916 (aged 32)
- Burial place: Étaples Military Cemetery
- Military career
- Allegiance: United Kingdom
- Branch: British Army
- Rank: Captain
- Commands: 1/1st Buckinghamshire Battalion
- Conflicts: First World War: Battle of the Somme

Edward Vivian Dearman Birchall (10 August 1884 – 10 August 1916), was an English philanthropist who died of wounds at the Battle of the Somme. He left a legacy of £1000 for the promotion of voluntary services. The money was used to help create, in 1919, the National Council of Social Services. It later became the National Council for Voluntary Organisations, an umbrella body for charities in England.

== Early life and education ==
He was born on 10 August 1884 at Bowden Hall, (Note: Bowden Hall was purchased by Birchall's father in 1868 and is now a hotel. "Bowden Hall (also known as Creed's Place, Bounden Hall, Bowden Hall Ramada Hotel Gloucester)". Parks and Gardens. "Edward Vivian Dearman Birchall, BA, DSO". Magdalen College, University of Oxford.) Upton St Leonards, Gloucestershire, the third, and youngest, son of Dearman and Emily Jowitt Birchall.

Birchall attended school in Sunningdale, Berkshire, from 1893 to 1898 and Eton College from 1898 to 1903. He graduated from Magdalen College, University of Oxford with a BA in 1908.

== Military service ==
Birchall was a captain in the 1/1st Buckinghamshire Battalion. He died on 10 August 1916 and is buried in France, at Étaples Military Cemetery near Boulogne.
