= Longney and Epney =

Civil parish in Gloucestershire

Coordinates: 51.8030°N 2.3440°W

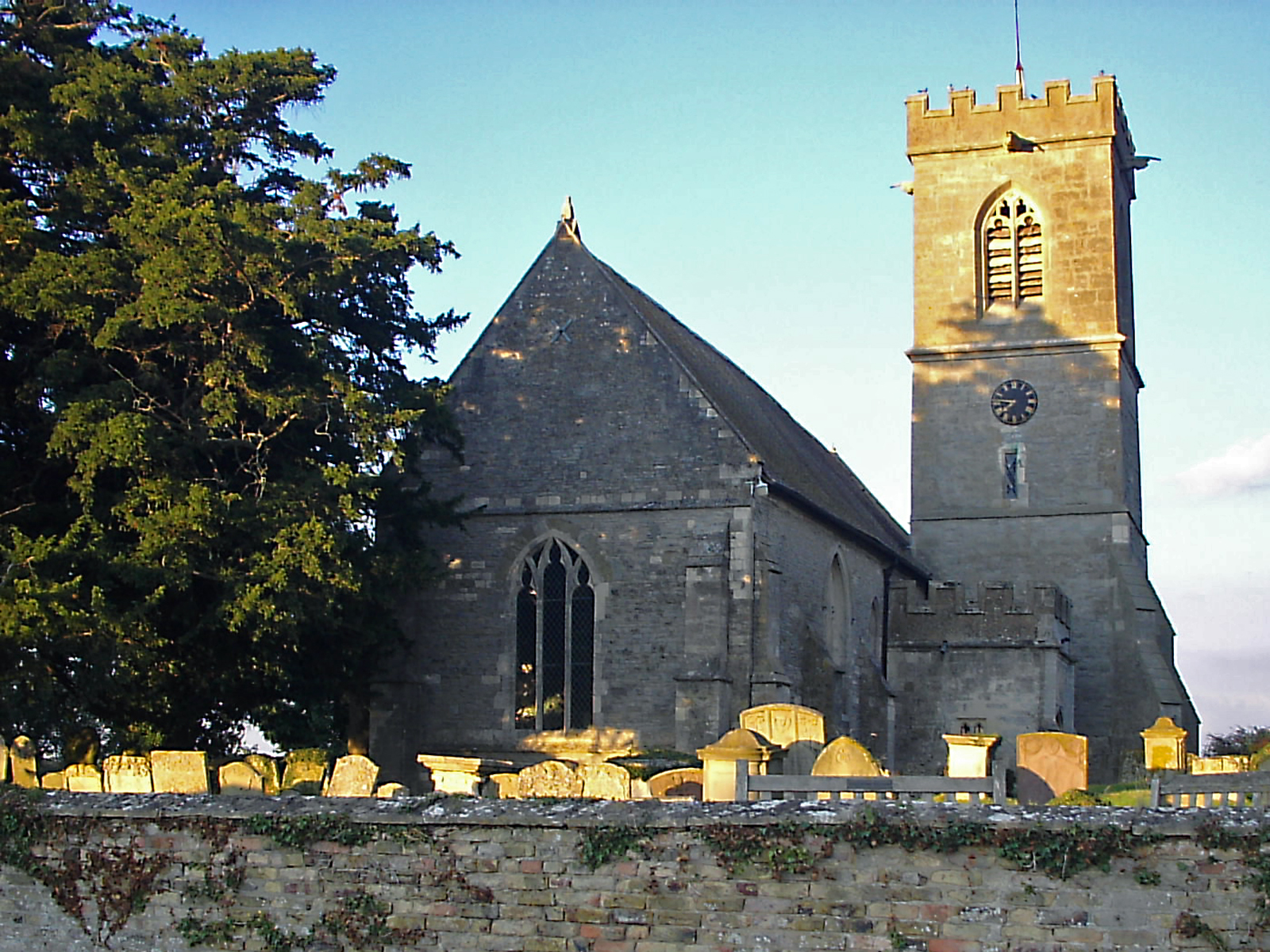
- St Laurence's church, Longney

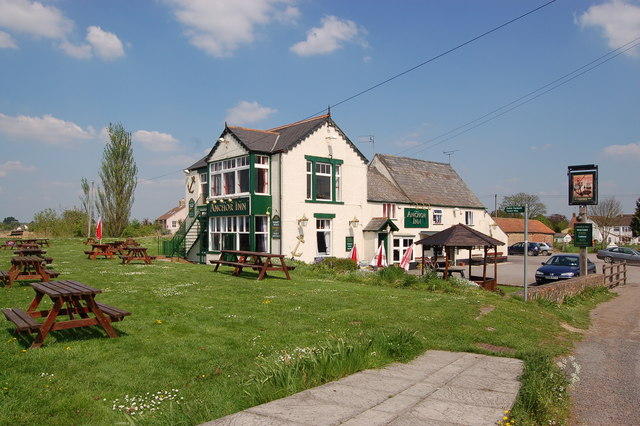
- The Anchor Inn, Epney

- Location within Gloucestershire
- Population: 288 (2011 census)
- Civil parish: Longney and Epney
- District: Stroud
- Shire county: Gloucestershire
- Region: South West
- Country: England
- Sovereign state: United Kingdom
- Police: Gloucestershire
- Fire: Gloucestershire
- Ambulance: South Western

Longney and Epney, formerly just Longney is a civil parish in the Stroud district, in the county of Gloucestershire, England. In 2011, its population was 288. It has a parish council, the lowest tier of local government. The parish includes the village of Longney and the hamlet of Epney.

The area of the parish is 745.95 acres.

== History ==
On 24 October 2003 the parish was renamed from "Longney" to "Longney and Epney".

== See also ==
- List of civil parishes in Gloucestershire
