= Upton St Leonards =

Village in Gloucestershire, England

Coordinates: 51.832°N 2.195°W

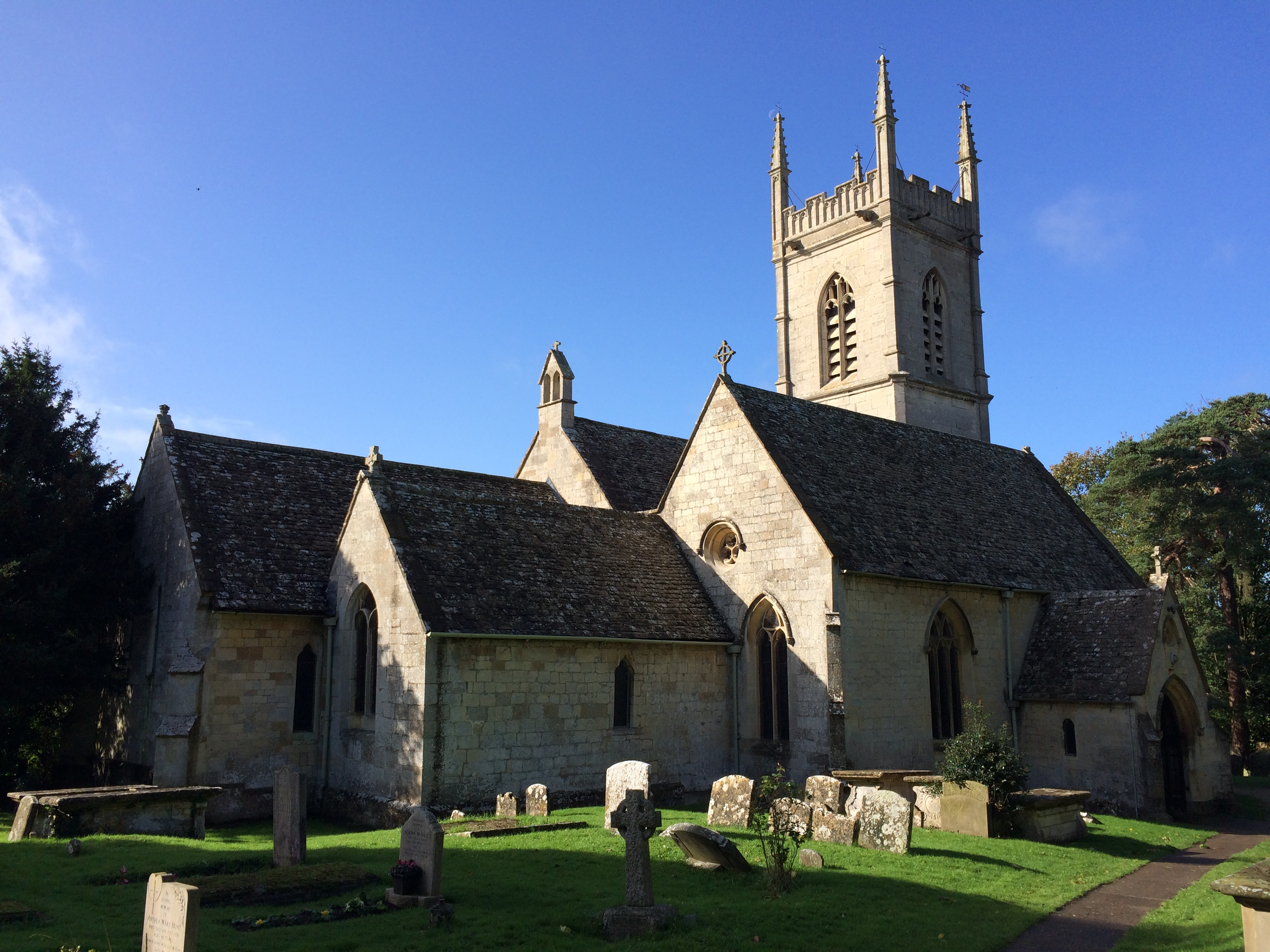
- The parish church at Upton St Leonards.

- Location within Gloucestershire
- Population: 2,276 (2011)
- OS grid reference: SO866148
- Civil parish: Upton St Leonards
- District: Stroud
- Shire county: Gloucestershire
- Region: South West
- Country: England
- Sovereign state: United Kingdom
- Post town: GLOUCESTER
- Postcode district: GL4
- Dialling code: 01452
- Police: Gloucestershire
- Fire: Gloucestershire
- Ambulance: South Western
- UK Parliament: Stroud

Upton St Leonards is a village in the English county of Gloucestershire. Forming part of the district of Stroud, it is a mile or so north of the A46 road between Stroud and Cheltenham.

== Facilities ==
The village has two four-star hotels (Hatton Court Hotel and Bowden Hall Hotel) a Church of England parish church, a pub, a primary school, and a village hall.

The village has won the Bledisloe Cup for the Best Kept Village in Gloucestershire in the large village category more than 20 times, most recently in 2006.

== Governance ==
An electoral ward in the same name exists. This ward stretches south from Upton St Leonards to Harescombe. The total population of the ward as at the 2011 census was 2,845.

== Clubs and societies ==
The village has a branch of the Mothers' Union and of the Women's Institute.

The village also has a successful local football side that run two teams within the Stroud District Football league; the First team won the 2010/2011 Division 3 title and moved into Division 2 in 2011. The 2011/2012 season proved successful with both the first and second teams winning their respective divisions. The reserve team also added a County Cup title to the league titles.

== See also ==
- Edward Vivian Birchall
- Prinknash Abbey
