= Holcombe House =

Country house in Gloucestershire, England

Coordinates: 51°48′09″N 2°12′27″W

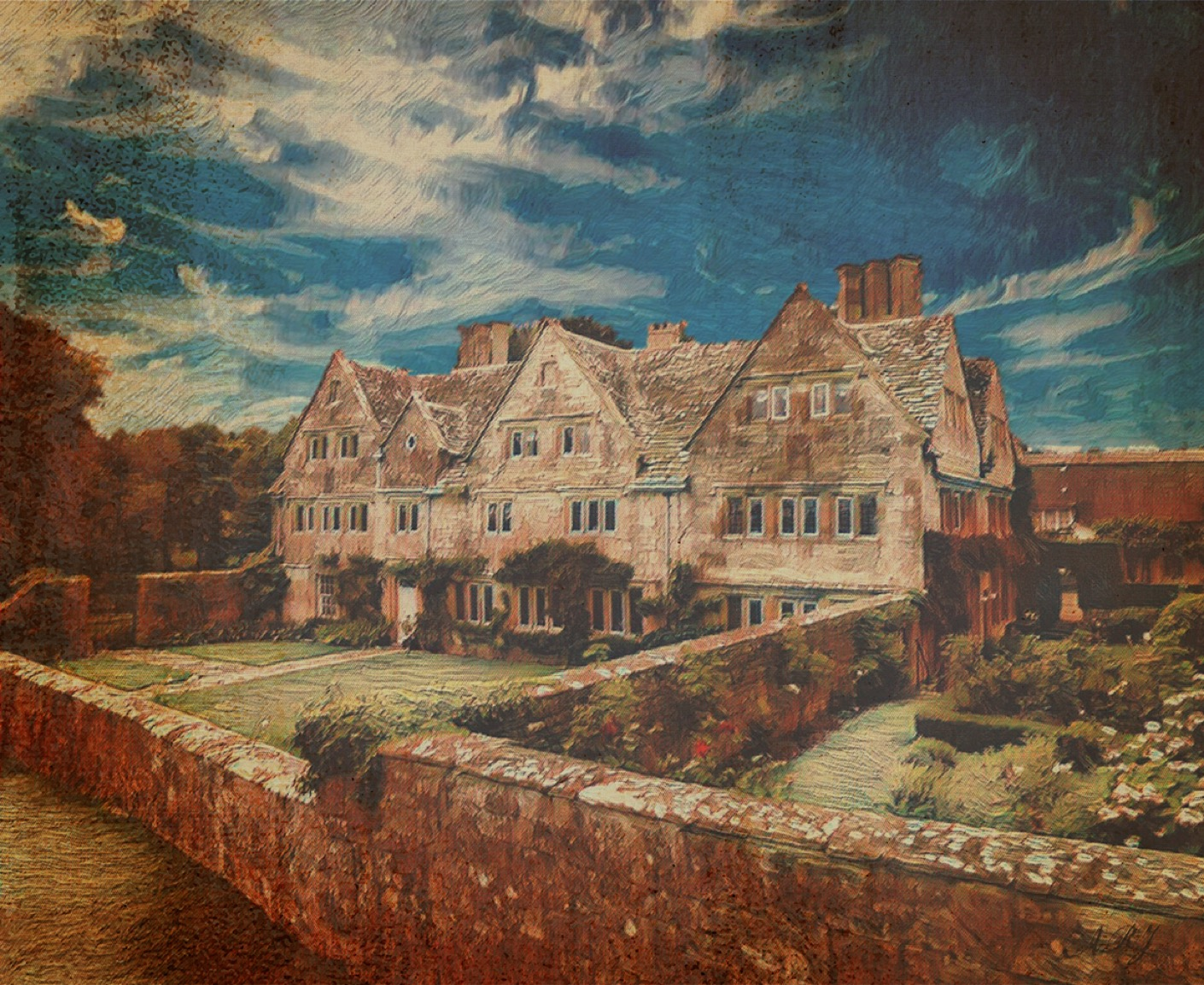

General information
- Status: Grade II* listed
- Town or city: Painswick
- Country: Great Britain
- Owner: Privately Owned

Design and construction
- Architect(s): Detmar Blow

Holcombe House is a large Grade II* listed country house located near Painswick, Gloucestershire. The house is a fine example of an Arts and Crafts Cotswolds manor house.

== History ==
Holcombe House was originally built for a wealthy clothier from Painswick in the late 1600s, and was later enlarged and remodelled in the early 1900s by Detmar Blow in the Arts and Crafts manner. The house was subject of a painting by Charles March Gere in 1926.

There are a number of associated listed structures associated with the house including the boundary walls and dovecote which are both Grade II listed.
