= Framilode =

Village in Gloucestershire, England

Coordinates: 51.791°N 2.366°W

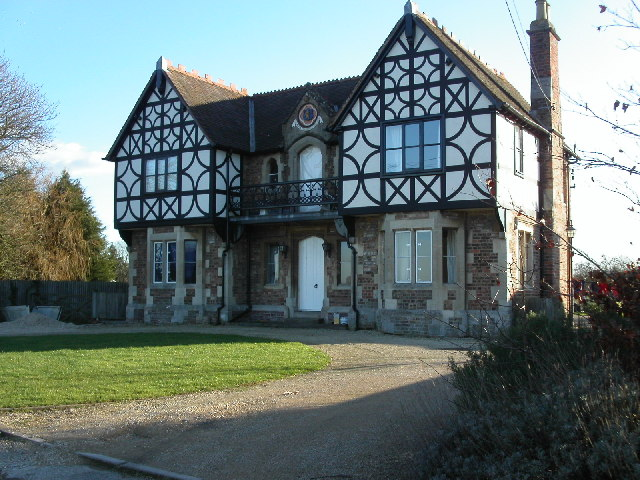
- The former Darrell Arms

- Location within Gloucestershire
- OS grid reference: SO7510
- Civil parish: Fretherne with Saul
- District: Stroud
- Shire county: Gloucestershire
- Region: South West
- Country: England
- Sovereign state: United Kingdom
- Post town: GLOUCESTER
- Postcode district: GL2
- Dialling code: 01452
- Police: Gloucestershire
- Fire: Gloucestershire
- Ambulance: South Western
- UK Parliament: Stroud

Framilode is a village on the banks of the River Severn in Gloucestershire, England, in the parish of Fretherne with Saul. It consists of two settlements: the larger, Framilode, is at the mouth of the River Frome. The smaller settlement, Framilode Passage, lies about 0.5 mile downstream.

The name, first recorded in the 7th century, means "Frome crossing point", probably signifying a crossing of the Severn by the mouth of the Frome. However, by the 16th century the ferry was further downstream at Framilode Passage, and the ferry across the Severn here continued in occasional use until the Second World War.

In 1126 Gloucester Abbey acquired a mill on the Frome at Framilode, and both corn mills and fulling mills continued to operate in the village until the late 18th century. The opening of the Stroudwater Canal in 1779 created water shortages, and by 1786 the mills were used for tinplate manufacture. By 1831 the mills were used as a forge, but were derelict by 1841.

The Stroudwater Canal also entered the Severn at Framilode, and a canal basin was built at Framilode in 1794 and 1795. After the Gloucester and Berkeley Canal opened in 1827 use of the stretch between the junction with the new canal and the Severn declined, and in the 1920s the section was blocked and fell into disuse. The basin was subsequently filled.

Framilode became an ecclesiastical parish in 1855, and the parish church of St Peter was built in 1854. The church is a Grade II listed building. The ecclesiastical parish was merged with the parish of Fretherne in 1949, and is now part of the Severnside group of parishes.
