= Stonehouse Court Hotel =

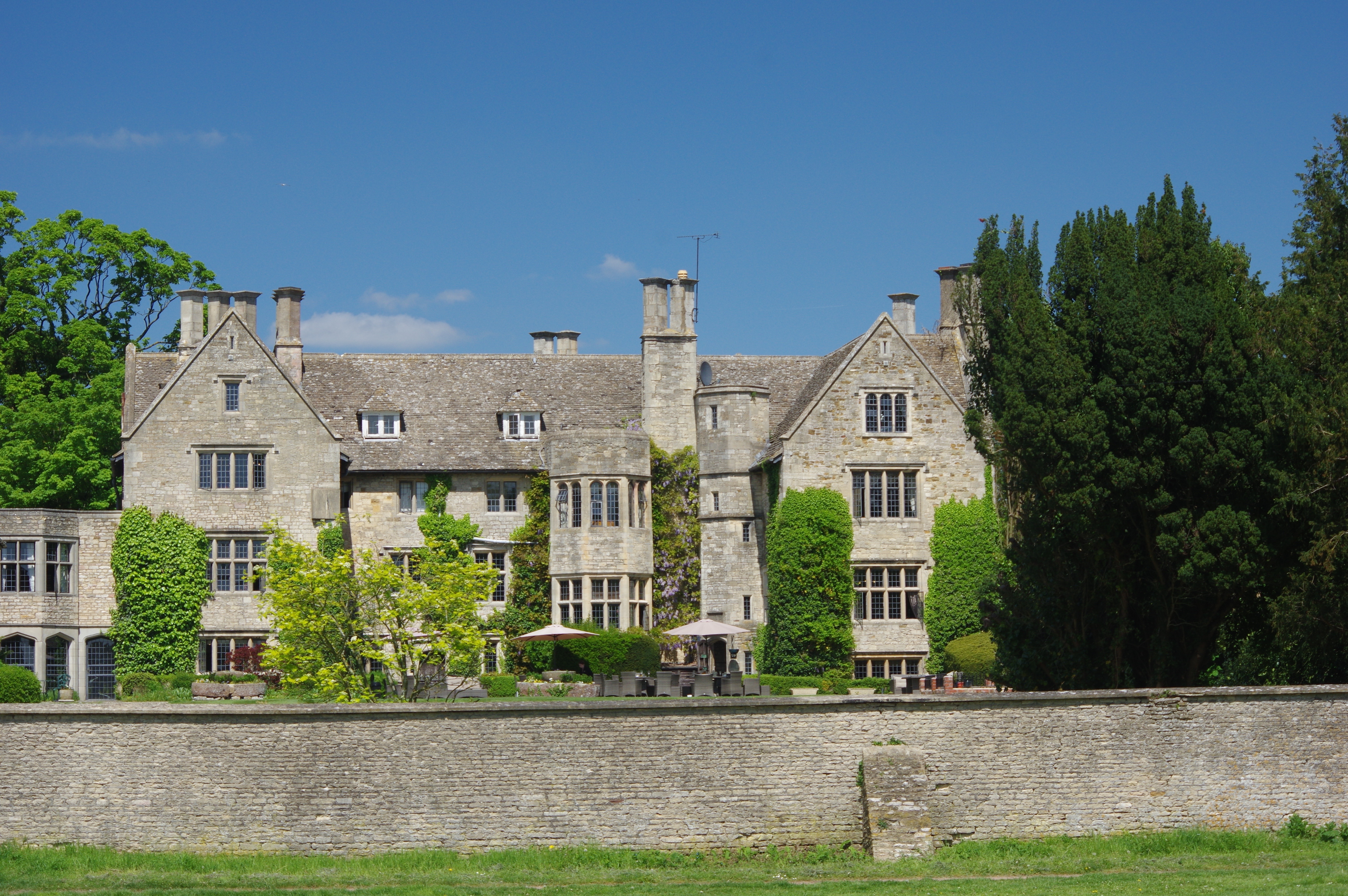
- Stonehouse Court

- Location in Gloucestershire
- 51.744°N 2.293°W
- Location: Stonehouse, Gloucestershire, England

The Stonehouse Court is a Grade II* listed manor house in Stonehouse, Gloucestershire, England which is now a hotel. It is located next to St Cyr's Church and the Stroudwater Canal.

== History ==
Stonehouse Court was listed in William the Conqueror's Domesday Book, which was written in 1086. For there, surrounded by countryside, was a manor house built in stone - quite different from the many wattle and daub buildings that were normally found. And so the area was named "Stanhus" in the book. Today, that name has little changed: from Stanhus to Stonehouse.

William De Ow owned the manor. On site, there were two mills - where still industry continues to this day - and a vineyard. There is a possibility that the Romans, who introduced the grape into England, had planted the vineyard.

That old manor saw some life over the many years it stood, a symbol for the town. One of its masters, John Maltravers, was found guilty of involvement in the brutal murder of Edward II of England in Berkeley Castle in 1327. He had to flee abroad where he remained for many years. The present building dates from 1601. It suffered in a fire in 1908 but was restored.
