= Saul, Gloucestershire =

Village in England

Coordinates: 51.782°N 2.366°W

Saul
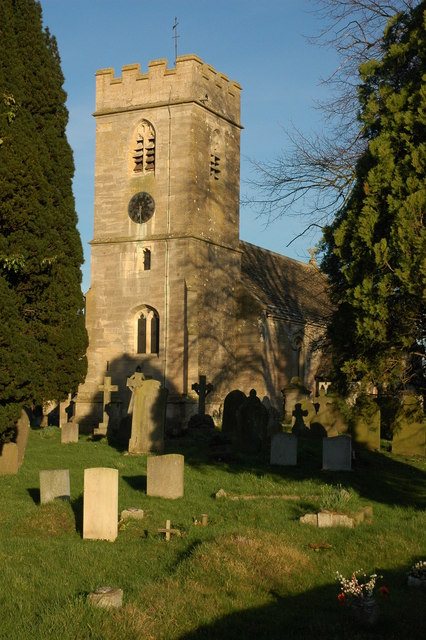
- Church of St James the Great at Saul

- Location within Gloucestershire
- OS grid reference: SO 748 093
- Civil parish: Fretherne with Saul
- District: Stroud
- Shire county: Gloucestershire
- Region: South West
- Country: England
- Sovereign state: United Kingdom
- UK Parliament: Stroud

Saul is a village and former civil parish, now in the parish of Fretherne with Saul, in the Stroud district, in the county of Gloucestershire, England. In 1881 the parish had a population of 597. On 24 March 1884 the parish was abolished to form Fretherne with Saul; part also went to Moreton Valance and Standish.

== Saul Junction ==
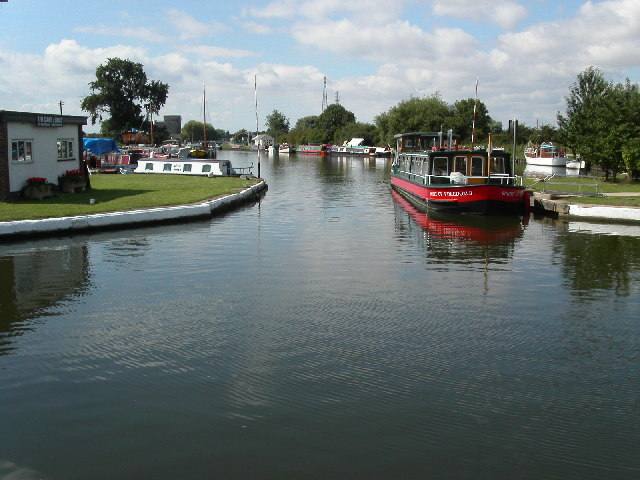
Saul Junction

The village lends its name to the nearby junction of the Stroudwater Navigation and the Gloucester and Sharpness Canal, a unique example of a crossing between two separately-owned canals.

This is a popular and busy area, with three swing bridges, an active boatyard including dry dock, a visitor centre operated by the Cotswold Canals Trust and a Canal & River Trust office, historically significant listed structures, a rowing club, car parks and a café, a marina including chandlery, boat hire and charitable excursions, extensive towpath moorings, a variety of walking routes around and along the two canals, and community events such as carol singing at Christmastime.

A pillbox that was part of the British anti-invasion preparations of the Second World War can still be found on the banks of the canal – Canal & River Trust volunteers have converted it into a safe roost for endangered pipistrelle bats.

== Notable residents ==
- William John Westwood (1925–1999), the 36th Anglican Bishop of Peterborough, was born in Saul.
