= Harescombe =

Village in Gloucestershire, England

Coordinates: 51.791°N 02.239°W

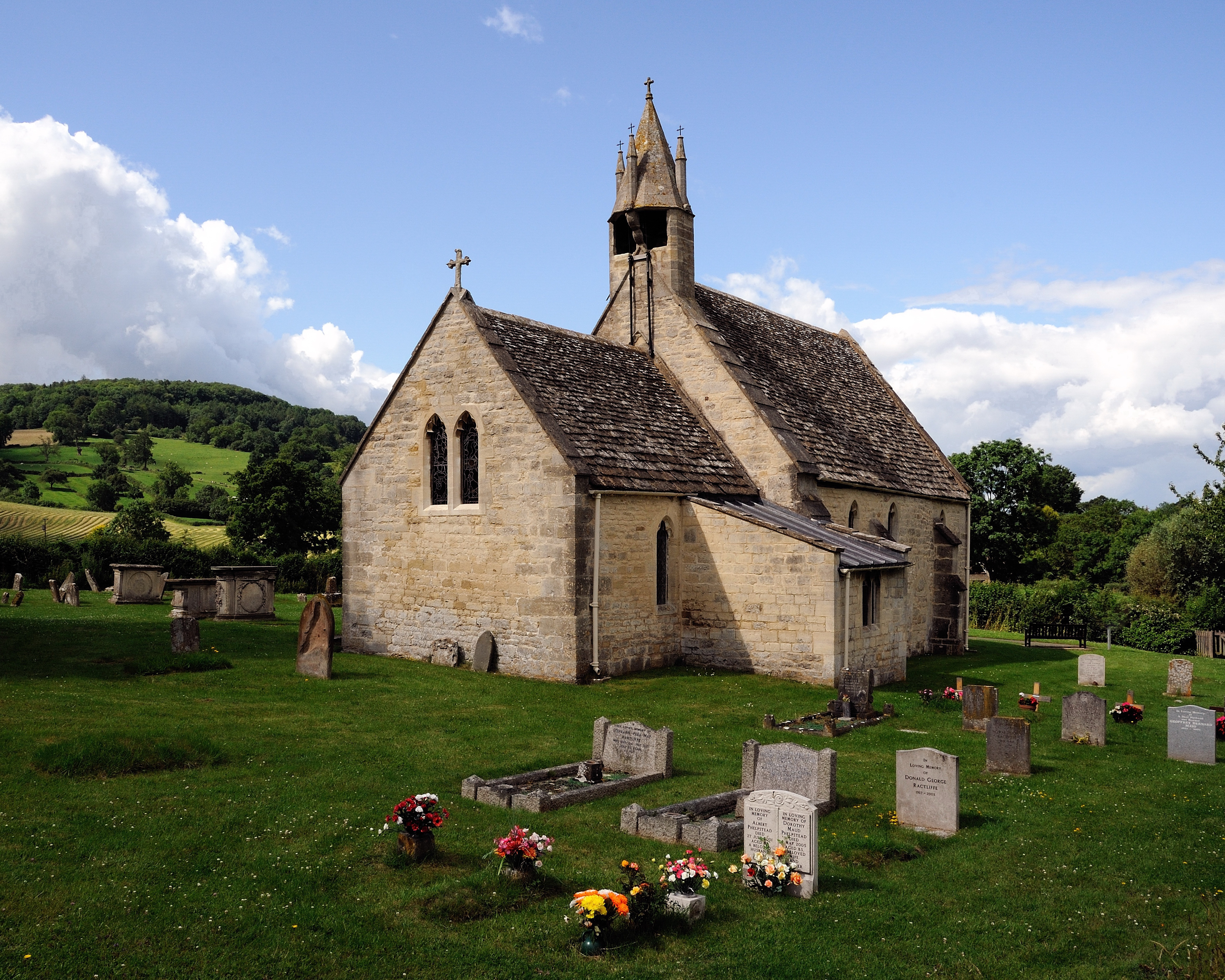
- The Church of St John the Baptist

- Location within Gloucestershire
- Population: 247 (2011)
- OS grid reference: SO8310
- Civil parish: Harescombe
- District: Stroud
- Shire county: Gloucestershire
- Region: South West
- Country: England
- Sovereign state: United Kingdom
- Post town: Gloucester
- Postcode district: GL6 6
- Dialling code: 01452
- Police: Gloucestershire
- Fire: Gloucestershire
- Ambulance: South Western
- UK Parliament: Stroud

Harescombe is a small village in Gloucestershire, England. It is situated 5 miles (8 km) south of Gloucester. The village rests at the foot of the well-known range of the Cotswolds called the Haresfield Beacon and Broadbarrow Green.

== Etymology ==
In the Domesday book, it was listed as Hersecome meaning "Hersa's" (a name) + "valley" (from the Celtic term "cwm").

It was once thought that the first part of the name derived from Saxon term "here" (army), thus the full meaning of "Harescombe", giving the place the meaning, "the Army's Valley".

== History ==
Haresfield Beacon and Broadbarrow Green were sites of ancient British and Roman encampments. These encampments were a part of a chain of fortresses expressly mentioned by Tacitus as having been raised by Ostorius Scapula between the Severn and Avon Rivers: old British works adapted by the Romans to their own requirements.

Hilles House was designed by Detmar Blow. He built the mansion for himself after 1914,

== The Church of St John the Baptist ==
The Church of St John the Baptist in Harescombe was constructed in the 13th century. It was consecrated in 1315. The walls are ashlar limestone, and the roof is of stone slate. The church has an unusual bellcote and a small octagonal stone spire, as well as small octagonal pinnacles on the four sides. Small iron crosses were added to these pinnacles in 1870–71 when Francis Niblett restored the church. The belfry has two bells, one of which has been determined to be the oldest bell (circa 1180) in Gloucestershire.

Several of the memorial inscriptions on markers in the adjacent graveyard date from the 17th century, with the oldest being for Thomas Roberts, Gent., dated 20 January 1632.

The Church of St John the Baptist is a Grade II* listed building with English Heritage.
