= St Swithun's Church, Brookthorpe =

Coordinates: 51.8084°N 2.2400°W

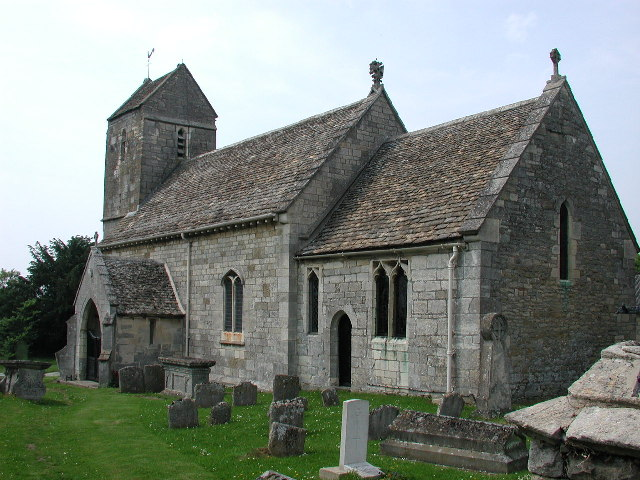

- Location in Gloucestershire
- OS grid reference: SO 835 122
- Location: Brookthorpe, Gloucestershire
- Country: England
- Denomination: Anglican
- Website: St Swithun's Church, Brookthorpe

History
- Dedication: Saint Swithun

Architecture
- Functional status: Redundant
- Heritage designation: Grade II*
- Designated: 10 January 1955
- Architectural type: Church
- Style: Gothic
- Groundbreaking: 13th century
- Completed: 1892

Specifications
- Materials: Limestone, stone slate roofs

St Swithun's Church is a historic Anglican church in the village of Brookthorpe, Gloucestershire, England under the care of The Churches Conservation Trust. It is recorded in the National Heritage List for England as a designated Grade II* listed building.

== History ==
The church was built in the 13th century. A north aisle was added in 1892 during a restoration.

== Architecture ==
=== Exterior ===
St Swithun's is constructed in limestone with stone slate roofs. Its plan consists of a nave with a north aisle, a south porch, a chancel with a roof at a lower level than the nave, a north vestry, and a west tower. The tower is in two stages with a saddleback roof. In the lower stage on the west side is a lancet window. The upper stage contains louvred bell openings. On the south of the church, the gabled porch has diagonal buttresses and two-light window on its sides. On the north side there is a gabled buttress at the east end and a lancet window. To the right of this is the aisle with a lean-to roof. This has two triple windows in the north wall, a lancet window on the east, and a chimney at its junction with the nave. At its west end the aisle is continuous with the vestry. The east window in the chancel is a lancet in Early English style. On the south wall of the chancel is a priest's door with a lancet window on its left, and a two-light window on the right. The north wall has a two-light window in Early English style.

=== Interior ===
Between the nave and the north aisle is a two-bay arcade with a central circular pier. In the chancel is a 19th-century reredos, and a restored 19th-century piscina in the north wall. The octagonal font is in stone and dates from the 17th century, and the timber hexagonal pulpit is from the 18th century. Some of the windows contain 19th-century stained glass. In the tower is a wall memorial to George Venn who died in 1694. Around the north nave window is carving by Eric Gill as a memorial to the architect Detmar Blow who died in 1939. The porch contains a wall plate with a chronogram hiding the date of the execution of Charles I. The single-manual organ was originally built in 1768 by John Snetzler, probably for the Wilder family of Sulham Manor. It remained with the family until 1932 when it was given to Tilehurst Mission Church. In 1939 it was bought from the mission church for St Swithun's and restored by Percy Daniel and Company of Clevedon. In 1981 it was further restored by John Coulson of Bristol, when the pedalboard was removed.

== External features ==
In the churchyard are five limestone chest tombs that have been designated as Grade II listed buildings. One dated 1666 is that of John Weyman. Nearby is the tomb of Susanna Smith, who died in 1697, and of other members of her family. The tomb of Thomas Browning is dated 1654. Nearby is the tomb of Iohane Browneing (sic), who died in 1643, and who was presumably the wife of Thomas. The fifth chest tomb, this one dating from the 18th century, is that of a person who has not been identified. The churchyard also contains the war grave of a World War II airman.

== See also ==
- List of churches preserved by the Churches Conservation Trust in the English Midlands
