= Longney =

Village in Gloucestershire, England

Coordinates: 51.8091°N 2.3484°W

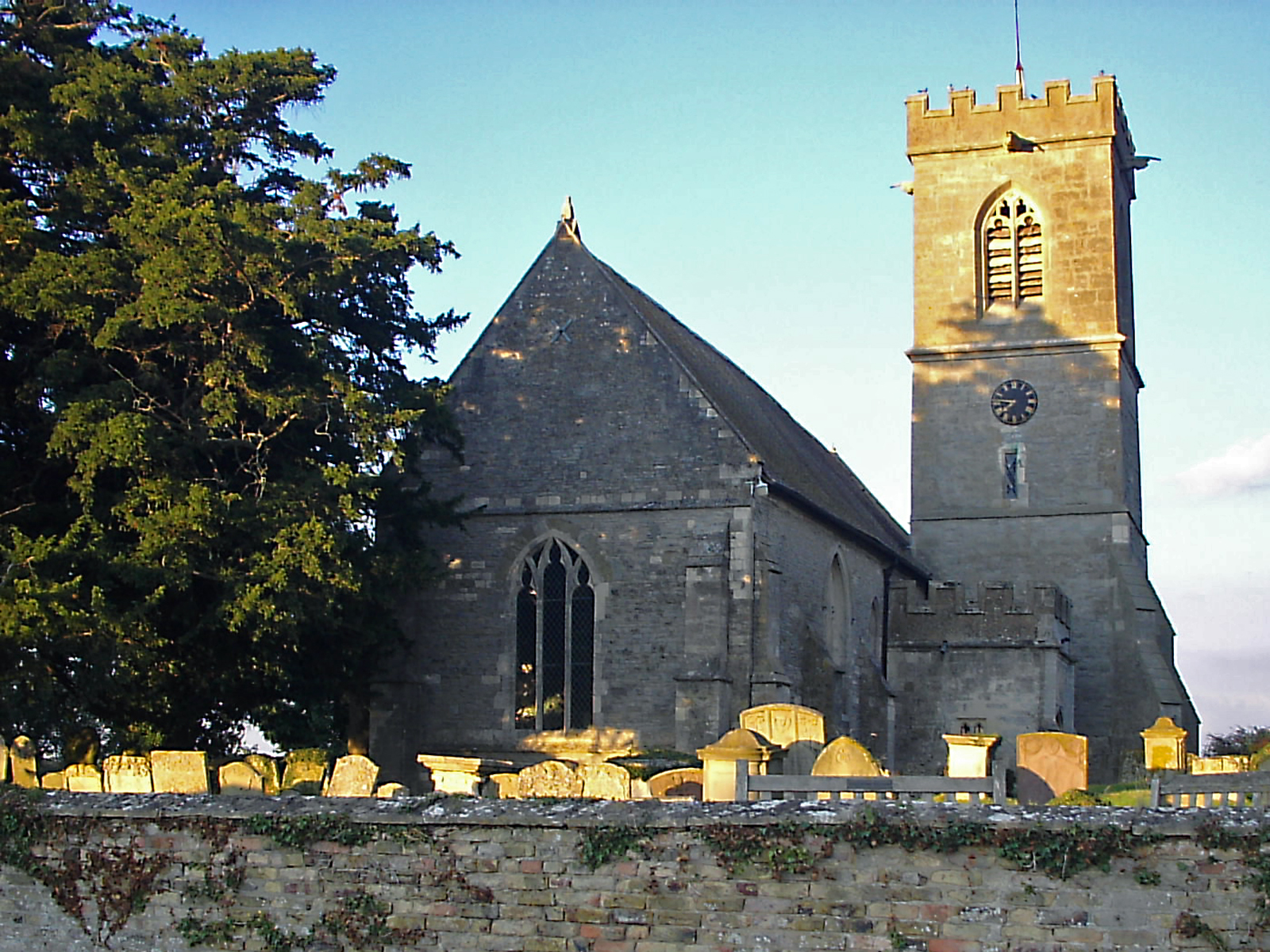
- St Laurence's Church, Longney

- Location within Gloucestershire
- Population: 285 (Longney and Epney parish, 2011 Census)
- Civil parish: Longney and Epney
- District: Stroud
- Shire county: Gloucestershire
- Region: South West
- Country: England
- Sovereign state: United Kingdom
- Post town: Gloucester
- Postcode district: GL2
- Police: Gloucestershire
- Fire: Gloucestershire
- Ambulance: South Western
- UK Parliament: Stroud

Longney is a village in the civil parish of Longney and Epney, in the Stroud district, in Gloucestershire, England, on the River Severn 5 miles south-west of Gloucester. The parish is long and narrow and the main trades are agricultural, with several farms throughout. Longney is the Saxon name meaning a long island. The population of the Longney and Epney parish is 285 (2011).

Two roads run through the village. The first, Longney Road, leads to Elmore and Hardwicke, the other to Epney. Many houses were built in conjunction with the Gloucester and Sharpness Canal, brick construction provided by local brick works. Thatching for houses was from the reed beds at Frampton-on-Severn.

The local school is a Church Of England Primary. The Grade I listed village church dedicated to St Laurence dates to the 13th century, and has a 14th-century tower. The ecclesiastical parish is part of the benefice of Hardwicke and Elmore with Longney, which is part of the Diocese of Gloucester.
