= Brookthorpe =

Village in Gloucestershire, England

Coordinates: 51.808°N 2.237°W

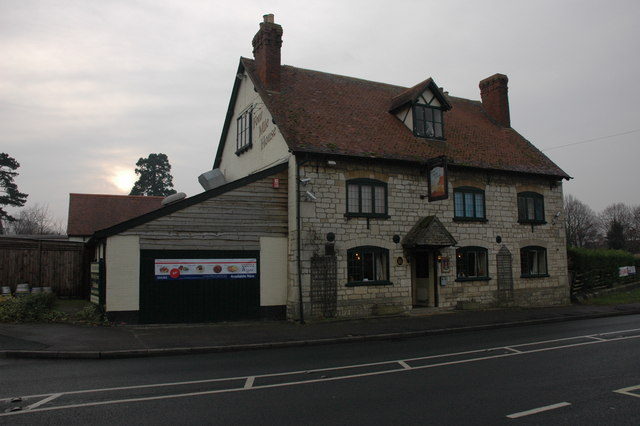
- Fagin's, Brookthorpe

- Location within Gloucestershire
- OS grid reference: SO837121
- Civil parish: Brookthorpe-with-Whaddon
- District: Stroud
- Shire county: Gloucestershire
- Region: South West
- Country: England
- Sovereign state: United Kingdom
- Police: Gloucestershire
- Fire: Gloucestershire
- Ambulance: South Western

Brookthorpe is a village and former civil parish, now in the parish of Brookthorpe-with-Whaddon, in the Stroud district, in the county of Gloucestershire, England. In 1931 the parish had a population of 194. It has a church called St Swithun's Church.

== History ==
The name "Brookthorpe" means 'Brook outlying hamlet'. Brookthorpe was recorded in the Domesday Book as Brostorp.

On 1 April 1935 the parish of Whaddon was merged with Brookthorpe, on 3 July 1956 the parish was renamed "Brookthorpe with Whaddon".
