= Whitminster =

Coordinates: 51°46′18″N 2°19′40″W

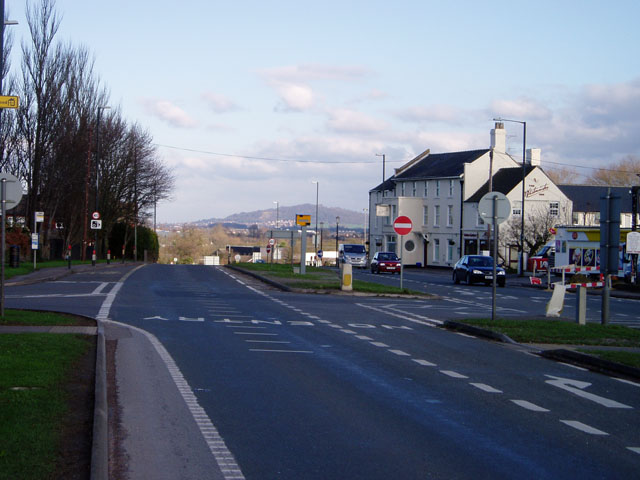
- Whitminster crossroads on the A38

- Location within Gloucestershire
- Population: 881 (2011 Census)
- Civil parish: Whitminster
- District: Stroud
- Shire county: Gloucestershire
- Region: South West
- Country: England
- Sovereign state: United Kingdom
- Post town: Gloucester
- Postcode district: GL2
- Police: Gloucestershire
- Fire: Gloucestershire
- Ambulance: South Western
- UK Parliament: Stroud

Whitminster is a village and civil parish in the Stroud district, in Gloucestershire, England, on the A38 trunk road approximately 6 miles (10 km) south of Gloucester and 6 miles (10 km) north-west of Stroud. The parish population at the 2011 census was 881. The hamlet of Wheatenhurst is signposted from the A38 at Whitminster. Whitminster is close to Junction 13 of the M5 motorway, with Bristol, South Wales and the south Midlands all within an hour's drive.

Wheatenhurst manor, with Whitminster House and the parish church of St Andrew, lies about 1 mile (2 km) to the west of the modern village. Plans for additional new housing were announced in Spring 2017.

Whitminster has two pubs: The Old Forge Inn, a traditional English pub, and The Whitminster Inn offering accommodation. There is a village shop, a chip shop, a Chinese restaurant and takeaway, and an Indian takeaway. The local school is the Whitminster Endowed C.O.E Primary School. The village also contains a commercial 'Krate Village' containing multiple businesses including a Pizza shop and Falafel store.

== History ==
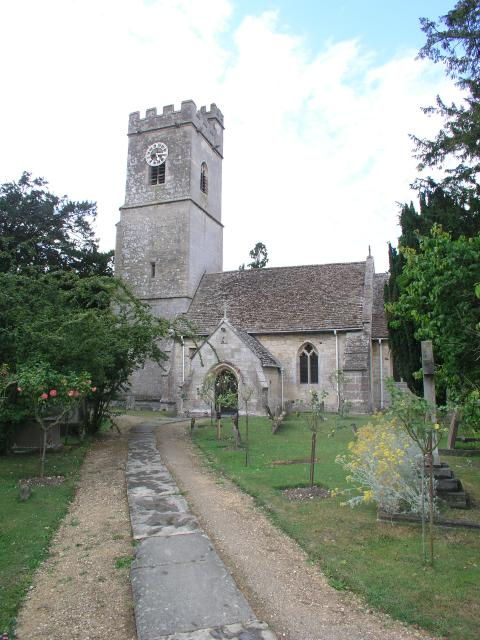
Whitminster Church

The manor was originally known as Wheatenhurst—the name changed officially in 1945—and was recorded in the Domesday Book in 1086 as Witenhert. The name means "white wooded hill", or possibly "wooded hill of a man named Hwita". The name was corrupted to Whitnester and then Whitmister, and by the 17th century evolved by popular etymology to Whitminster. There was never a minster here. Either or both names were used of the parish until the 20th century, but the village on the A38 came to be known as Whitminster, whereas the smaller group of houses west of the main road in the centre of the parish came to be known as Wheatenhurst.

The manor of Wheatenhurst was held by Brictric "of Newton Valence", at the time of Edward the Confessor and post-Conquest it was held by Harding of Bristol in pledge from Brictric. It later passed to the de Bohun family, as part of their large landholdings in the west of England.

Whitminster is used in the 1919 published short ghost story titled "The Residence at Whitminster", by M. R. James, in his third collection of ghost stories, A Thin Ghost and Others. There appears to be no connection, apart from the name, with the real village, though the name of a major character in the story, the 16 year old Viscount Saul, is possibly inspired by Saul Junction, close to the parish church.

== Notable people ==
- Richard Owen Cambridge, poet
- James Morrison, singer
