= Frampton on Severn =

Village in Gloucestershire, England

Coordinates: 51.77°N 2.36°W

- Location within Gloucestershire
- Population: 1,432 (2011 census)
- OS grid reference: SO7508
- Civil parish: Frampton on Severn
- District: Stroud
- Shire county: Gloucestershire
- Region: South West
- Country: England
- Sovereign state: United Kingdom
- Post town: Gloucester
- Postcode district: GL2
- Dialling code: 01452
- Police: Gloucestershire
- Fire: Gloucestershire
- Ambulance: South Western
- UK Parliament: Stroud

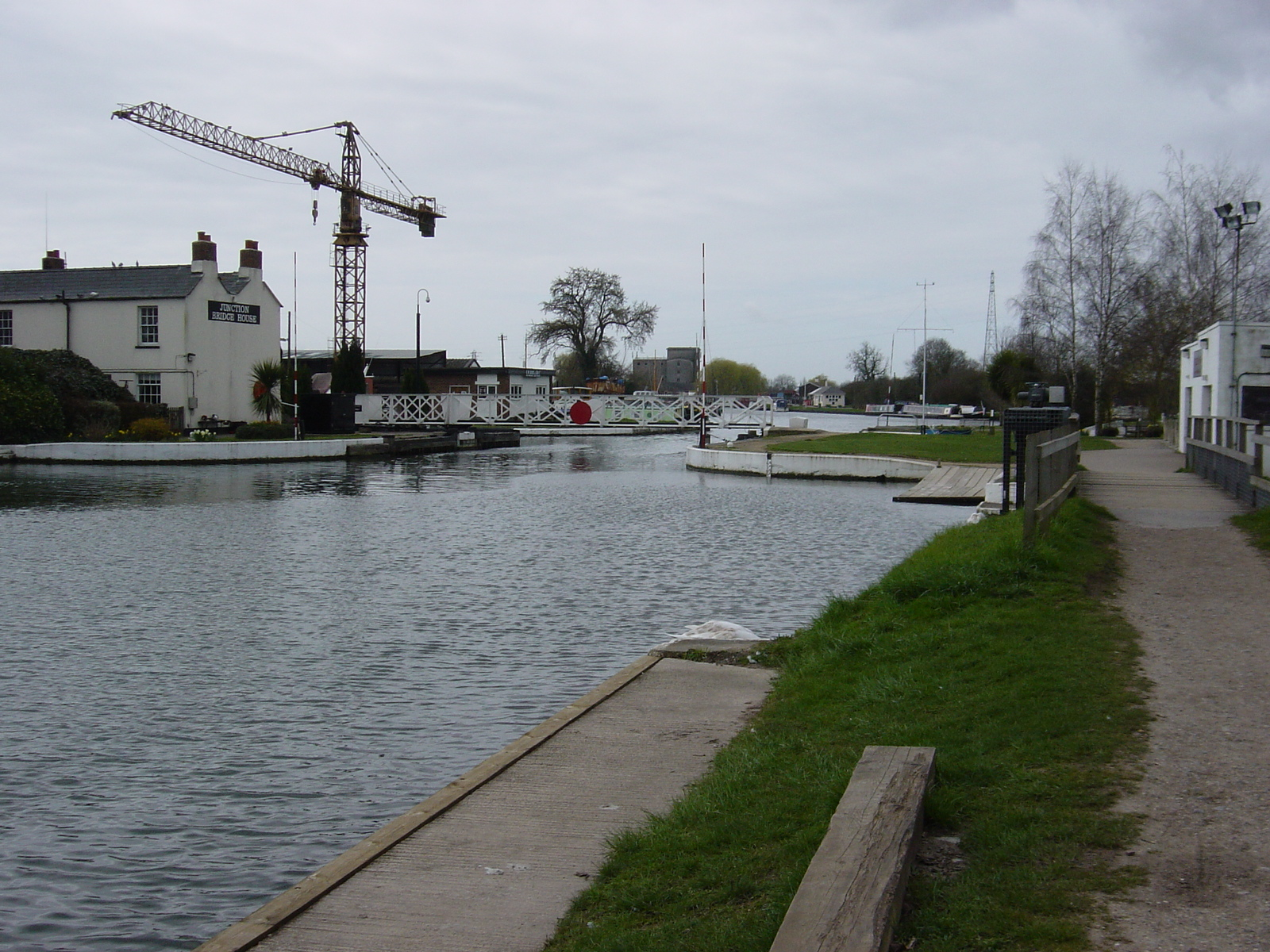
The Gloucester and Sharpness Canal near Frampton on Severn

Frampton on Severn is a village and civil parish in Gloucestershire, England. The population is 1,432.

== Geography ==
The village is approximately 10 miles (16 km) south of Gloucester, at grid reference SO750080. It lies on the east bank of the River Severn, and on the west bank of the River Frome, from which it takes its name. The village is linked by footpath to the Sharpness Canal.

There is a large village green, 22 acres (8.9 ha) in size and reputedly one of the longest in England. The green was known as Rosamund's Green by the mid-17th century, apparently from the village's association with Fair Rosamund. There is a designated Conservation Area around the green, including Tudor and Georgian houses, and the village also has a Site of Special Scientific Interest, Frampton Pools. Much of the village forms part of the Frampton Court Estate, owned by the Clifford family.

The Gloucester and Sharpness Canal runs to the west side of the village and the green has three ponds. There are two pubs on The Green: The Bell Inn and The Three Horseshoes.

== Governance ==
There is a parish council, consisting of nine members.

The village falls in the 'Severn' electoral ward. This ward starts in the north east at Moreton Valence then follows the M5 motorway south west to Slimbridge. The total ward population at the 2011 census was 4,760.

== History ==
The Domesday Book mentioned the manor of Frampton in 1089. The parish church of St Mary the Virgin was consecrated in 1315 but partly dates from the 12th century, while the congregational church was built in 1769.

The Elver Eating World Championships have been held annually at Frampton since 2015; an earlier elver eating competition had ended by 1990.

=== Hock Crib ===
Hock Crib is a breakwater on the banks of the River Severn near Frampton on Severn. Built by Augustus Berkeley, 4th Earl of Berkeley, in 1739 to defend nearby farmlands from erosion and flooding, the breakwater's existence is acknowledged in numerous archives and records during the 18th century, including tidal defence plans in 1845 and redevelopment plans dating from 1877. The breakwater was an often-used point of reference for navigation of the river; however, it fell into disrepair and disappeared beneath the sandbanks. In December 2013, however, it emerged, and local historians were granted funds from the Bristol and Gloucestershire Archaeological Society to photograph and study it.
