= Round house (Thames and Severn Canal) =

Circular canal workers' dwellings on the Thames and Severn Canal in England

Thames and Severn Canal round houses
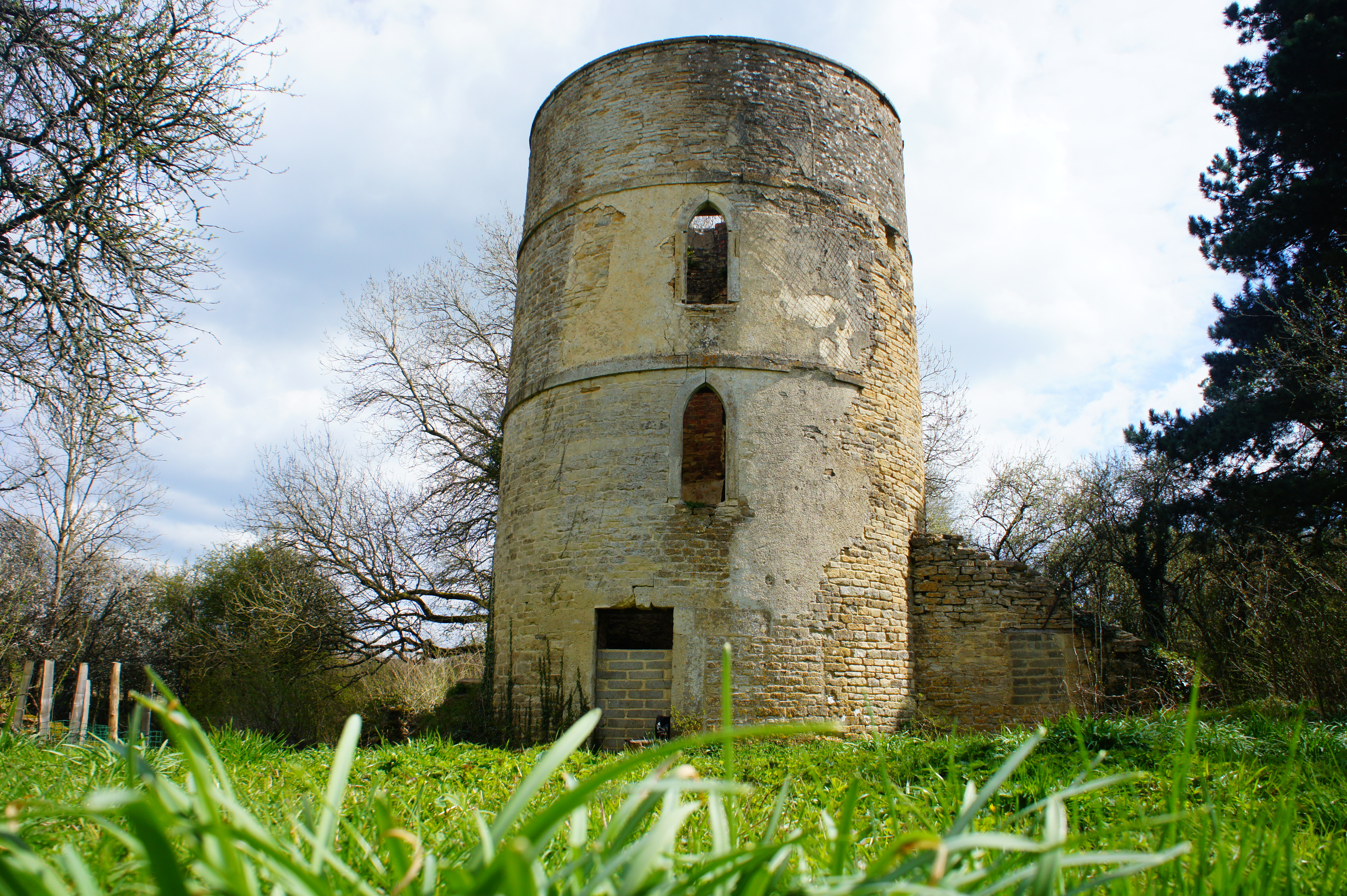
- The round house at Coates, pictured in 2021
- Type: Lengthsman's cottage
- Location: Thames and Severn Canal
- Area: Gloucestershire and Wiltshire, England
- Built: c. 1790–92

Listed Building – Grade II
- Official name: Canal Round House, Chalford
- Designated: 28 June 1960
- Reference no.: 1171394
- Coordinates: 51.7209°N 2.1583°W

Listed Building – Grade II
- Official name: The Round House, Lechlade
- Designated: 4 July 1985
- Reference no.: 1089423
- Coordinates: 51.6875°N 1.7054°W

Listed Building – Grade II
- Official name: The Round House and Lock, Latton
- Designated: 1 November 1985
- Reference no.: 1023127
- Coordinates: 51.6634°N 1.8877°W

Listed Building – Grade II
- Official name: Round House, Marston Maisey
- Designated: 1 November 1985
- Reference no.: 1198062
- Coordinates: 51.6655°N 1.8112°W

The round houses on the Thames and Severn Canal are five former lengthsmen's cottages built along the canal between Chalford and Lechlade in Gloucestershire, England. Constructed in the 1790s when the canal was built, all but one of them are Grade II listed and have been restored as private dwellings. The buildings have been described as "peculiar" and "a distinctive feature of the Thames and Severn Canal's architecture".

== History ==
The round houses were built at the same time as the Thames and Severn Canal was constructed, although sources differ as to whether they were built c. 1790–91 or c. 1791–92. Built as lengthsmen's (or watchmen's) cottages along the canal at Chalford, Coates, Latton, Marston Meysey, and Lechlade, the houses provided a simple residence for employees of the canal company who oversaw the local stretch of the waterway. The round house at Latton became known as Cerney Wick along with its adjacent lock. Similarly, the building near Lechlade is known as Inglesham round house after the village on the opposite bank of the Thames. Like Cerney Wick and Inglesham, the buildings at Chalford and Marston Meysey were either adjacent to or within 1 mile (1.6 km) of locks on the canal, and over time some of the occupants' duties extended to lockkeeping.

The round house at Inglesham was at the junction of the canal and the River Thames, and a further requirement of the lengthsman there may have been to collect tolls from bargemasters and superintend the traffic using the canal at this point. A 1794 account of the canal in The Monthly Review described how the Inglesham round house – known as the wharf house – was used as a "precautionary deposit for coals brought by the canal, in case the navigation should be at any time obstructed by the severity of frosts, or an accidental deficiency of water."

The round house at Coates was on the summit pound, and at one time the occupant of the house was specifically described as a watchman for that pound. The house was roughly 750 yd (690 m) from the Sapperton Tunnel, although the tunnel had its own watchman based in a cottage at the north portal. The nearest lock (Note: Daneway Bridge Lock) to the round house was 3 mi (4.8 km) away, and was not easily accessible for the lengthsman as the canal tunnel had no towing path. The locks leading down from the summit pound at Siddington were more than 5 mi (8.0 km) from the Coates round house, and were consequently closer to the round house at Cerney Wick. As well as the round houses and the gabled watchman's cottage near the Sapperton Tunnel, the canal company employed watchmen at Stroud, Brimscombe, Puck Mill, Siddington, Cirencester (on the canal arm to the town), and South Cerney.

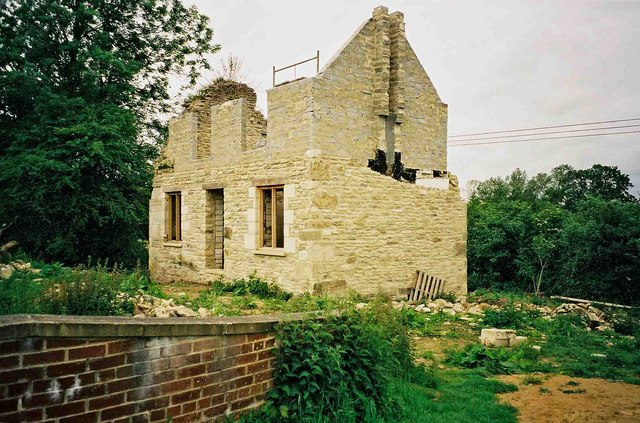
In the 1830s, the round houses at Cerney Wick and Marston Meysey were superseded by rectangular lengthsmen's houses (Wildmoorway Lock Cottage pictured)

By 1831, the impracticalities of the cramped conditions was evident and the round houses at Cerney Wick and Marston Meysey were superseded by new rectangular cottages at Wildmoorway and Eisey respectively. At least one of the two vacant round houses faced a call to be demolished, however this plan did not come to fruition and the buildings stood until the replacement cottages also fell into dereliction.

The Inglesham round house featured in a description of 1922, a few years before this lower end of the canal had been formally abandoned: "shaded by a group of Lombardy Poplars is a building called the Round House, guarding the entrance to the old Thames and Severn Canal [...] The Round House is much frequented by tourists and holiday parties during the summer months. The very name of the place excites a pleasing curiosity and impels one to go and see it." A later description of the round houses outlined their drawbacks: "the accommodation is cramped; furniture passes unwillingly through the small doorways and lines the walls uneasily; water is drawn from a well; sanitation is outside."

=== Occupancy and ownership ===
In the 1840s, the occupant of Inglesham round house was lockkeeper Charles Cuss. The 1851 United Kingdom census showed that 46-year-old canal labourer Richard Roberts lived in the Coates round house with his wife Sarah. The 1871 census listed Alfred Meecham along with his wife and three children at the round house. By the following census in 1881, the round house was occupied by George Smith and his family of five. Unlike Roberts and Meecham, Smith was described as the "summit watchman on the Thames & Severn Canal". In the 1891 census, the Chalford round house was occupied by 61-year-old lockkeeper George Dowdeswell.

Around the turn of the century, a prospective watchman of the Coates area visited the round house with his fiancée, who said she would not marry him unless the living conditions were improved. The canal proprietors subsequently converted the lower-floor stable into habitable space and expanded other living areas. Some of these works are evident at the rear of the building, where a rectangular extension housed the new scullery. The first two censuses of the 20th century – in 1901 and 1911 – showed the Coates occupants as canal labourer Edmund Wicks and canal banksman Alfred Southwood respectively.

Since the canal's abandonment in the early 20th century, the round houses have passed into private ownership. Four of the round houses have been restored and converted into (or form part of) private dwellings. In the 1980s, the converted round house at Cerney Wick was described as "one of the canal's most attractive buildings". The building at Coates is now owned by the Bathurst estate, and is the only derelict example of the round houses. It forms part of the Cotswold Canals Trust's third phase of restoration. For a time, the Chalford round house was used as a museum of Thames and Severn canal memorabilia and artefacts.

=== Legacy ===
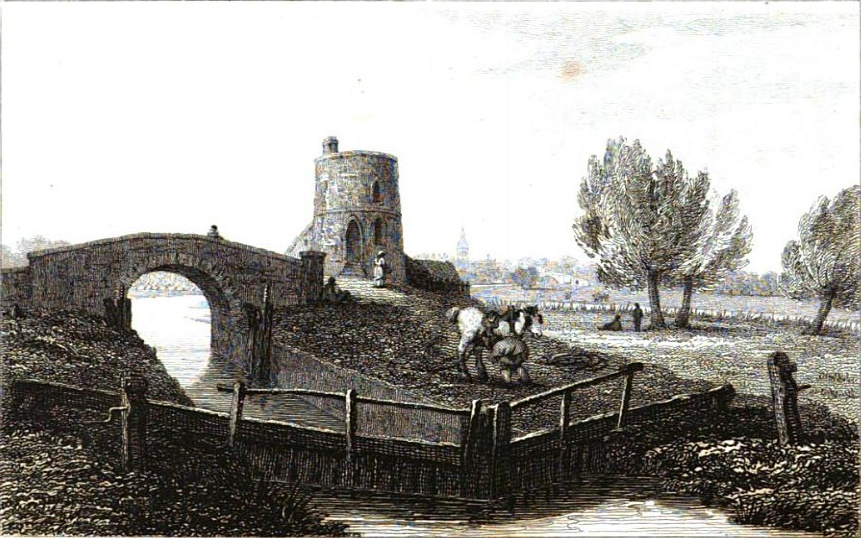
The Inglesham round house depicted by Samuel Owen (1811)

In 1811, William Bernard Cooke's The Thames included a line engraving of Samuel Owen's painting of Inglesham Lock and the adjacent round house.

The round houses of the Thames and Severn Canal were featured in Reginald Arkell's novel The Round House (1958); Arkell described the design as "a relic of days when you could travel across England, from Thames to Severn, by canal. [The round house] had been the home of the lock-keeper and was built on the lines of a small observation tower". Roundhouse Lake, a nature reserve managed by Gloucestershire Wildlife Trust, takes its name from the nearby round house at Inglesham.

John Piper made a pencil and watercolour painting of the round house and bridge at Inglesham.

== Design ==
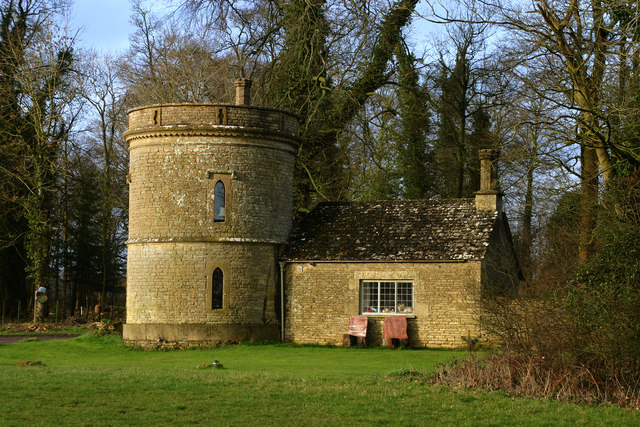
The Round House at Cirencester Park may have inspired the design

The design of the round houses has been described as "peculiar" and "distinctive". In 1794, Inglesham round house was described as "a very pleasing embellishment of the scene". It has been suggested that the design is and "probably unique", although a round house – described as a lock keeper's house – was built at Gailey Wharf on the Staffordshire and Worcestershire Canal. It is not certain why a circular plan was chosen, although it may have been from an engineering perspective (to avoid the need for quoins) or to provide better views along the canal, as was the purpose at Gailey Wharf. It is possible that the circular design was influenced by the round plan of windmills, and the contractors who built the round houses may have also built the Round Tower at Siddington – a brick building approximately 800 yd (730 m) from the canal, possibly first used as a windmill. The Round Tower was likely constructed at the same time as the canal, and like the round house at Coates, also on land owned by Earl Bathurst. The shape of the round houses has been described as "a distinctive feature of the Thames and Severn Canal's architecture." A aesthetically similar round house at nearby Cirencester Park, built before the waterway was constructed, may have inspired the design of the canal buildings. A folk tale suggests that the circular plan of the buildings was "to allow the devil nowhere to hide".

The buildings all had three storeys, of which the bottom was a stable, the first floor a living room, and the second (top) floor a bedroom. The stable was entered at ground level, and the living areas entered via external steps or a raised earthwork leading up to the first floor. An internal staircase led to the second floor. Pevsner's Wiltshire volume of The Buildings of England described the Marston Meysey round house as "rather like a tower, with pointed windows."

The round houses had a conical roof, although the ones at Coates, Marston Meysey, and Inglesham were inverted to catch rainwater. At Coates, the inverted cone funneled water to a leaden bowl which was then piped out of the roof and down to the occupied floors. The use of a rainwater cistern at Coates was especially needed as the canal there is situated on the Inferior Oolite with its low porosity and limited aquifer storage.

The stone buildings were rendered with plaster and stucco. The walls are approximately 30 inches (760 mm) thick, and the internal diameter of the buildings is 16 feet 10 inches (5.13 m). The internal walls of the building were not perfectly circular, as one side was slightly straightened to accommodate straight furniture and utilities (such as a range) as well as the internal staircase which was situated between the outer wall and an inner wall.

== Locations ==
Location	Coordinates	Listed status	Photograph	Reference
Chalford, Gloucestershire	51.7209°N 2.1583°W	Grade II		
Coates, Gloucestershire	51.6997°N 2.0447°W	Not listed		
Cerney Wick, Wiltshire	51.6634°N 1.8877°W	Grade II		
Marston Meysey, Wiltshire	51.6655°N 1.8112°W	Grade II		
Lechlade, Gloucestershire	51.6875°N 1.7054°W	Grade II		
