= Cotswold Canals =

Cotswold Canals may refer to:

- Stroudwater Navigation
- Thames and Severn Canal
- Cotswold Canals Trust
