= Wilts & Berks Canal Trust =

- Founded: 1988
- Type: Charity, waterway society
- Purpose: Wilts & Berks Canal
- Location: Dauntsey Lock, Chippenham, Wiltshire
- Coordinates: 51°31′14″N 2°00′25″W
- Region served: Oxfordshire, Swindon, West Berkshire, Wiltshire
- Services: Charitable services
- Key people: Justin Lewis (Chair of Trustees)
- Website: wbct.org.uk
- Formerly called: Wilts & Berks Canal Amenity Group

The Wilts & Berks Canal Trust is a registered charity no. 299595, and a waterway society based in Wiltshire, England, concerned with the restoration of the Wilts & Berks Canal.

The Trust is the successor to the Wilts & Berks Canal Amenity Group (formed in 1977) and a founder member of the Wiltshire, Swindon & Oxfordshire Canal Partnership, which embraces the Trust, the local authorities for the areas through which the route of the canal passes, statutory bodies, and other interested parties. The Trust's headquarters are at Dauntsey Lock, adjacent to the canal between Chippenham and Royal Wootton Bassett.

== History ==
The Trust originated in 1977 as the Wilts & Berks Canal Amenity Group, whose remit was to protect what remained of the canal following its abandonment in 1914, and restore short sections for their amenity value.

The first Wilts & Berks Canal Trust was formed in 1997. Wilts & Berks Canal Amenity Group was a founding member of the Trust together with North Wiltshire District Council, West Wiltshire District Council, Swindon Borough Council, Vale of the White Horse District Council, Oxfordshire County Council and Wiltshire County Council. In 1998, the Trust published a feasibility study commissioned by North Wiltshire, examining the restoration of the full route together with the connected North Wilts Canal. However, the structure of the Trust prevented them from applying for certain funds and grants, and it was wound up in 2001, being replaced by the Wilts & Berks Canal Partnership.

As a result of the name-change to a Partnership, the Wilts & Berks Canal Amenity Group was able to adopt the name 'Wilts & Berks Canal Trust' later in 2001. The Trust then became a registered charity.

In 2007, membership rose to over 2000 for the first time. The Duchess of Cornwall became patron of the trust in 2006.

== Aim ==
To protect, conserve and improve the route of the Wilts & Berks Canal, North Wilts Canal, and branches, for the benefit of the community and environment, with the ultimate goal of restoring a continuous navigable waterway linking the Kennet and Avon Canal near Melksham, the River Thames near Abingdon, and the Thames and Severn Canal near Cricklade.

== See also ==
- List of waterway societies in the United Kingdom
- Waterway restoration
- Waterway Recovery Group
