= Wilts and Berks Canal =

Canal linking the Kennet and Avon Canal to the River Thames

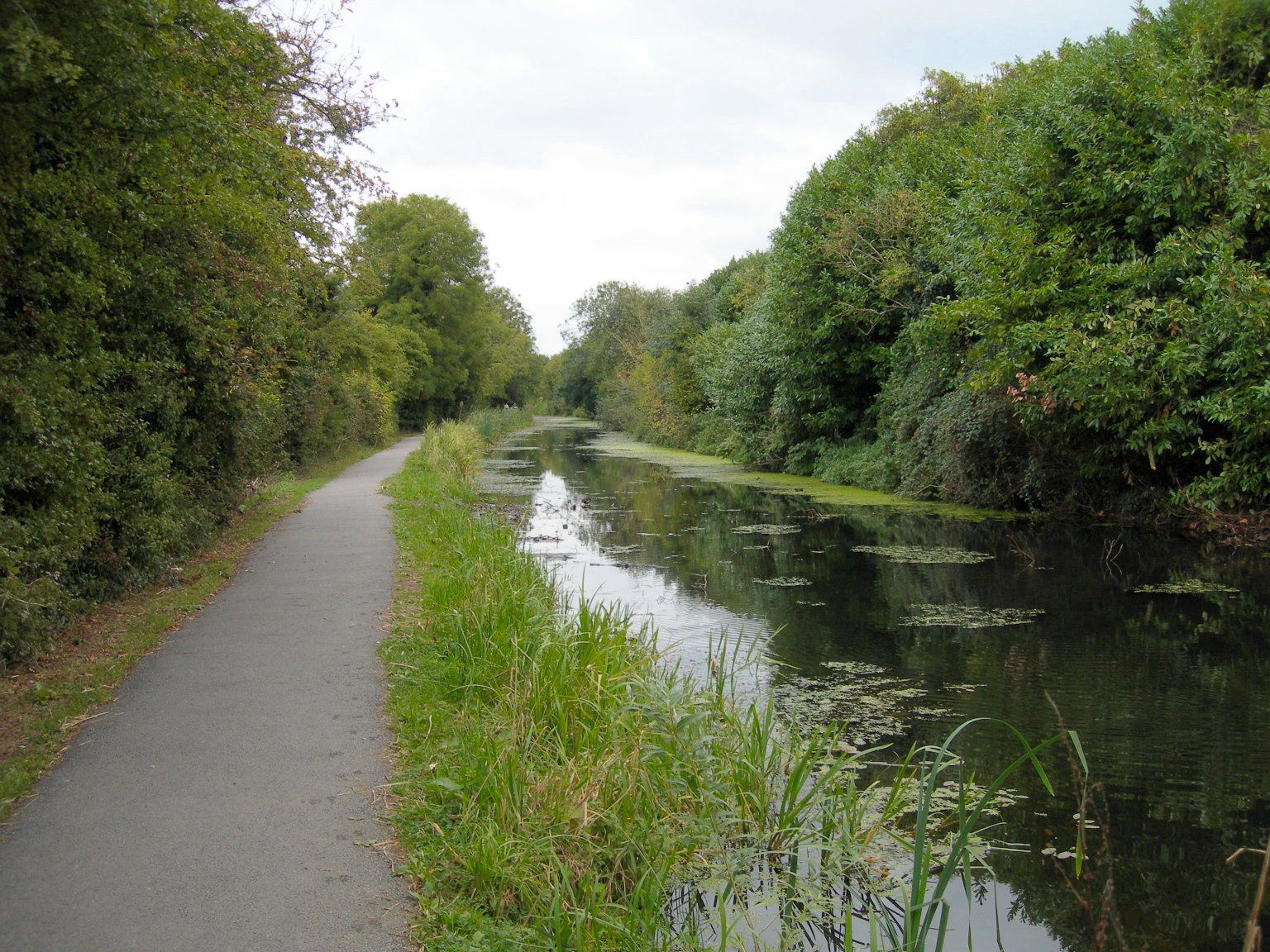
- The canal near Rushey Platt, Swindon
- Interactive map of Wilts and Berks Canal

Specifications
- Length: 52 miles (84 km) (+ branches totalling 6 miles (9.7 km))
- Maximum boat length: 72 ft 0 in (21.95 m)
- Maximum boat beam: 7 ft 0 in (2.13 m)
- Locks: 42 (+ 3 on Calne branch)
- Status: Under restoration

History
- Principal engineer: Robert Whitworth
- Other engineer: William Whitworth
- Date of act: 1795
- Construction began: 1796
- Date completed: 1810
- Date closed: 1914

Geography
- Start point: River Thames
- End point: Kennet and Avon Canal
- Branches: Chippenham; Calne; Wantage; Longcot
- Connects to: North Wilts Canal

The Wilts and Berks Canal is a canal in the historic counties of Wiltshire and Berkshire, England, linking the Kennet and Avon Canal at Semington near Melksham, to the River Thames at Abingdon. The North Wilts Canal merged with it to become a branch to the Thames and Severn Canal at Latton near Cricklade. Among professional trades boatmen, the canal was nicknamed the Ippey Cut, possibly short for Chippenham.

The 52-mile (84 km) canal was opened in 1810, but abandoned in 1914 – a fate hastened by a breach at Stanley aqueduct in 1901. Much of the canal subsequently became unnavigable: many of the structures were deliberately damaged by army demolition exercises; parts of the route were filled in and in some cases built over. In 1977 the Wilts & Berks Canal Amenity Group was formed with a view to full restoration of the canal. Several locks and bridges have since been restored, and over 8 miles (13 km) of the canal have been rewatered.

== Name ==
The official name of the canal is the "Wilts and Berks Canal" as cited in the local acts of Parliament that authorised its building and abandonment. The "Wiltshire and Berkshire Canal" is incorrect. Neither is it correct to refer to the "North Wilts Canal" as the "North Wiltshire Canal".

The canal's original name is retained for historical reasons despite local council boundary changes in 1973 that transferred part of Berkshire through which the canal passes (mostly the Vale of White Horse) to Oxfordshire.

== History ==
Wilts and Berks Canal Act 1795
- Act of Parliament
- Parliament of Great Britain
- Long title: An Act for making and maintaining a navigable canal from the river Thames or Isis, at or near the town of Abingdon, in the county of Berks, to join or communicate with the Kennet and Avon canal, at or near the town of Trowbridge, in the county of Wilts; and also certain navigable cuts therein described.
- Citation: 35 Geo. 3. c. 52
- Territorial extent: Great Britain

Dates
- Royal assent: 30 April 1795
- Commencement: 30 April 1795 (Note: The Acts of Parliament (Commencement) Act 1793.)
- Repealed: 8 June 1821
Other legislation
Amended by	Wilts and Berks Canal Act 1801
Repealed by	Wilts and Berks Canal Act 1810; Wilts and Berks Canal Navigation Act 1813; Wilts and Berks Canal Navigation Act 1821

Status: Repealed

Text of statute as originally enacted

Wilts and Berks Canal Act 1801
- Act of Parliament
- Parliament of the United Kingdom
- Long title: An Act for enabling the Company of Proprietors of the Wilts and Berks Canal Navigation, to raise Money for completing the said Canal; and to alter, explain, and amend the Act, passed in the Thirty-fifth Year of the Reign of His present Majesty, for making the said Canal.
- Citation: 41 Geo. 3. (U.K.) c. lxviii
- Territorial extent: United Kingdom

Dates
- Royal assent: 20 June 1801
- Commencement: 20 June 1801
- Repealed: 8 June 1821
Other legislation
Amends	Wilts and Berks Canal Act 1795
Amended by	Wilts and Berks Canal Act 1810
Repealed by	Wilts and Berks Canal Navigation Act 1821

Status: Repealed

Text of statute as originally enacted

The idea for the Wilts and Berks Canal grew from a proposal to construct a canal between Lechlade on the Thames and Severn Canal and Abingdon-on-Thames on the River Thames. A meeting was held at Abingdon in 1784, and the proposal gained support among local landowners. Subsequently, Frederick Page suggested a canal suitable for Thames barges to run between a junction with the Thames and Severn at Kempsford and Wantage, passing through Highworth near Swindon and Longcot. At Wantage, it would split into two, with one branch going to Abingdon and the other to Wallingford, further downstream on the Thames. The Kennet and Avon Canal had also surveyed a route through Calne and Chippenham, which had been discarded in favour of the route through Bradford-on-Avon and Devizes. A meeting to promote the ideas was held at Swindon on 12 November 1793, but presentation of a bill to Parliament was postponed until the plans were more mature.

James Black, representing the Thames and Severn Canal, asked William Whitworth the engineer for his canal to survey the route, including a link to his canal. By 22 February 1794, plans were sufficiently advanced that they were approved by a committee meeting at Swindon. The Earl of Peterborough chaired the meeting, which also heard that agreement had been reached with the Kennet and Avon Canal, although the junction with the Thames was still not finalised. By the meeting held on 16 May, Abingdon had been chosen as the connection to the Thames.

A bill for a canal from Trowbridge on the Kennet and Avon Canal, running through Melksham, Dauntsey, Wootton Bassett, Swindon, Shrivenham, and Charlow to terminate on the Thames at Abingdon, was submitted to Parliament. It faced opposition from the city of Oxford, who maintained that trade on the Thames above Abingdon and to the city would be considerably damaged, but despite their stance, the bill passed into law on 30 April 1795, when the Wilts and Berks Canal Act 1795 (35 Geo. 3. c. 52) received royal assent. The length of the canal was initially 55.25 miles (88.9 km), but provision was made for developments at the Trowbridge end. The Kennet and Avon Canal were proposing to alter their route, and the act allowed the proprietors to give the section from Trowbridge to Semington to the Kennet and Avon Canal Company if their new route was authorised within three years and built within seven. The deviation was authorised, and the Kennet and Avon built the length from Trowbridge to Semington, from where their main line continued on to Devizes. The length of the Wilts and Berks Canal was thus reduced to 51 miles (82 km).

As well as the main line, the act authorised three branch canals, to Calne, Chippenham and Wantage. It allowed the company to raise £111,900 through 1,119 shares at a cost of £100 each for the construction of the canal, with powers to raise an extra £150,000 if required. Although the plans submitted to Parliament had been signed by both Robert Whitworth Snr. and his son William, the younger Whitworth worked with John Ralph on costings for the work. This was estimated at £103,603 for the original main line and £8,350 for the branches. Robert Whitworth was contracted as engineer for the construction, on a similar basis as he had worked for the Ashby Canal. He would be responsible for design work and setting out, and would arrange to be on site for around three months each year. His son William would be on site as resident engineer, handling the day-to-day supervision of the project.

Work started at the western end, in the hope that once the canal reached Chippenham and Calne, they could generate revenue from the transport of coal, although this depended on the Somerset Coal Canal and the western end of the Kennet and Avon being completed. There were problems with cash flow, as the sale of shares had only raised £61,512 by 1801, all of which had been spent, leaving a shortfall of £85,199. They could not use the powers of the Wilts and Berks Canal Act 1795 to borrow money until all of the original shares had been bought, and so another act of Parliament, the Wilts and Berks Canal Act 1801 (41 Geo. 3. (U.K.) c. lxviii), was obtained allowing the company to raise a further £200,000 from shares to complete the canal. Having failed to sell all the £100 shares, new shares were issued at steadily decreasing values, to attract new classes of investors. The shares were issued at £65, £60, £40, £25 and finally £12 10s. A total of 7,436 shares were eventually sold, raising £224,393. This was supplemented by £22,200 from optional notes and by the company running up debts.

The canal was cut during the years 1796 to 1810. Robert Whitworth Snr. remained as an engineer on the canal from 1796 until he died in 1799, making regular progress reports to the company. William Whitworth was resident engineer during this period and subsequently became engineer until the canal's completion. The company hoped that construction would be completed in 1805, but it was not, and the canal opened in stages as it was finished. Swindon was reached in June 1804, South Marston in July 1805, and it opened to near Longcot in December 1805. A branch to Longcot was constructed in 1807, although it was not authorised, and this was resolved by an addition to the Wilts and Berks Canal Navigation Act 1835 (5 & 6 Will. 4. c. lix). Abingdon was reached on 22 September 1810. A boat carrying the proprietors passed through the final lock into the Thames at 2:30pm, who then departed to the Council Chamber for a celebration that went on late into the evening. The final cost of the project was £255,262.

Wilts and Berks Canal Act 1810
- Act of Parliament
- Parliament of the United Kingdom
- Long title: An Act to alter, amend and enlarge the Powers of Two Acts, passed for making and maintaining a navigable Canal from the River Thames or Isis, at or near the Town of Abingdon in the County of Berks, to join or communicate with the Kennet and Avon Canal, at or near the Town of Trowbridge in the County of Wilts, and also certain navigable Cuts therein described.
- Citation: 50 Geo. 3. c. cxlviii
- Territorial extent: United Kingdom

Dates
- Royal assent: 2 June 1810
- Commencement: 2 June 1810
- Repealed: 8 June 1821
Other legislation
Amends	Wilts and Berks Canal Act 1795; Wilts and Berks Canal Act 1801
Repealed by	Wilts and Berks Canal Navigation Act 1821

Status: Repealed

Text of statute as originally enacted

Wilts and Berks Canal Navigation Act 1813
- Act of Parliament
- Parliament of the United Kingdom
- Long title: An Act for explaining and amending an Act of His present Majesty, for making a Navigable Canal from the River Thames or Isis, near Abingdon in the County of Berks, to join the Kennet and Avon Canal, near Trowbridge in the County of Wilts; and certain Navigable Cuts.
- Citation: 53 Geo. 3. c. cxx
- Territorial extent: United Kingdom

Dates
- Royal assent: 3 June 1813
- Commencement: 3 June 1813
- Repealed: 8 June 1821
Other legislation
Amends	Wilts and Berks Canal Act 1795
Repealed by	Wilts and Berks Canal Navigation Act 1821

Status: Repealed

Text of statute as originally enacted

North Wilts Canal Act 1813
- Act of Parliament
- Parliament of the United Kingdom
- Long title: An Act for making and maintaining a Navigable Canal, from the Wilts and Berks Canal, in the Parish of Swindon, in the County of Wilts, to communicate with the Thames and Severn Canal in the Parish of Latton, in the same County.
- Citation: 53 Geo. 3. c. clxxxii
- Territorial extent: United Kingdom

Dates
- Royal assent: 2 July 1813
- Commencement: 2 July 1813
- Repealed: 8 June 1821
Other legislation
Repealed by	Wilts and Berks Canal Navigation Act 1821

Status: Repealed

Wilts and Berks Canal Navigation Act 1815
- Act of Parliament
- Parliament of the United Kingdom
- Long title: An Act to enable the Company of Proprietors of the Wilts and Berks Canal Navigation to raise Money for discharging the Debts of the said Company.
- Citation: 55 Geo. 3. c. vi
- Territorial extent: United Kingdom

Dates
- Royal assent: 23 March 1815
- Commencement: 23 March 1815
- Repealed: 8 June 1821
Other legislation
Repealed by	Wilts and Berks Canal Navigation Act 1821

Status: Repealed

Text of statute as originally enacted

Wilts and Berks Canal Navigation Act 1821
- Act of Parliament
- Parliament of the United Kingdom
- Long title: An Act for incorporating the Company of Proprietors of the North Wilts Canal Navigation with the Company of Proprietors of the Wilts and Berks Canal Navigation; and for repealing the several Acts passed for making and maintaining the said Canals, and for consolidating the Powers and Provisions thereof in One Act.
- Citation: 1 & 2 Geo. 4. c. xcvii
- Territorial extent: United Kingdom

Dates
- Royal assent: 8 June 1821
- Commencement: 8 June 1821
Other legislation
Repeals/revokes	Wilts and Berks Canal Act 1795; Wilts and Berks Canal Act 1801; Wilts and Berks Canal Act 1810; Wilts and Berks Canal Navigation Act 1813; North Wilts Canal Act 1813; Wilts and Berks Canal Navigation Act 1815; Wilts and Berks Canal Act 1795
Amended by	Wilts and Berks Canal Navigation Act 1835; Wilts and Berks Canal Act 1876; Swindon Corporation (Wilts and Berks Canal Abandonment) Act 1914

Status: Amended

Wilts and Berks Canal Navigation Act 1835
- Act of Parliament
- Parliament of the United Kingdom
- Long title: An Act for consolidating the Shares in the Wilts and Berks Canal Navigation, and for extending the Powers of the Act of Incorporation of the Company of Proprietors of the said Canal.
- Citation: 5 & 6 Will. 4. c. lix
- Territorial extent: United Kingdom

Dates
- Royal assent: 3 July 1835
- Commencement: 3 July 1835
Other legislation
Amends	Wilts and Berks Canal Navigation Act 1821
Amended by	Wilts and Berks Canal Act 1876

Status: Amended

Text of statute as originally enacted

The main canal was 51 miles (82 km) long, with branches totalling a little over 6 miles (10 km) to Chippenham, Calne, Wantage and Longcot. Although initial plans were for a canal suitable for Thames barges, it was cut as a narrow canal to take narrowboats 72 feet (22 m) long and 7 feet (2.1 m) wide. From Semington, the canal passed through 24 locks, which raised the level by 189 feet 3 inches (57.7 m) to the summit pound between Wootton Bassett and South Marston. A further 18 locks enabled the canal to descend 163 feet 9 inches (49.9 m) to Abingdon. There were also three locks on the Calne branch. There were three short tunnels.

== Expansion ==
Before the canal was completed, the proprietors were already thinking about how the canal could become part of a larger network. In 1809, they proposed a Western Junction canal, which would have crossed the Thames on an aqueduct and continued for a further 36.5 miles (58.7 km) by way of Thame and Aylesbury to join the Grand Junction Canal at Marsworth. Both canal companies agreed to contribute £100,000 to fund the project, but opposition from the Thames Commissioners, the Kennet and Avon Canal, the Oxford Canal and the Warwick and Napton Canal resulted in the bill being defeated in Parliament on 25 February 1811. A branch from the Grand Junction to Aylesbury was completed in 1815, and the two canals looked again at completing the link between Aylesbury and Abingdon in 1813 and 1817. They made a joint survey for the route in 1819, and the plan was reconsidered in 1828, but no further action occurred.

Their next plan was for a Bristol Junction Canal in 1810, running from Wootton Bassett via the Gloucestershire coalfield to Bristol. An initial survey was made by William Whitworth, and a bill presented to Parliament in 1811, but it was withdrawn amidst opposition from the Thames Navigation Commissioners, landowners and the Oxford Canal. A Central Junction Canal was the next proposal, running over 59 miles (95 km) from Abingdon to the Stratford-upon-Avon Canal. John Rennie oversaw a survey of its route, and the cost was estimated at £470,000, but no further action ensued when there was opposition from the Grand Junction Canal, the Oxford Canal and the Warwick and Napton Canal.

Throughout construction of their own canal, the Wilts and Berks Canal Company had considered a link to the Thames and Severn Canal, and in 1810 they wrote to the Thames and Severn to say that William Whitworth had surveyed a route from Wootton Bassett to Yeoing (now known as Ewen), near Kemble in Gloucestershire. The project, named the Severn Junction Canal, was altered to run from Swindon to Latton junction on the Thames and Severn, and was presented to Parliament in early 1811, but was withdrawn because it would probably have been defeated. By 1812, it had become the North Wilts Canal, and authority to build it was obtained in 1813. Of the many plans, this was the only one to reach completion when it opened on 2 April 1819.

The North Wilts Canal was originally formed as a separate company by the North Wilts Canal Act 1813 (53 Geo. 3. c. clxxxii). The branch was 9 miles (14 km) long and included 11 locks, an aqueduct over the River Thames and a small tunnel near Crichlade. Having borrowed £15,000 from the Exchequer Bill Loan Commissioners to help finance its construction, the company could not meet government demands for repayment of that loan, and after only two years of independence, proposed that it should merge with the Wilts and Berks Canal, whose shareholders had also contributed £15,000 to its construction costs. The merger was authorised by the passing of the Wilts and Berks Canal Navigation Act 1821 (2 Geo. 4. c. xcvii). The Wilts and Berks Canal took over the debt with the Exchequer Bill Loan Commission, North Wilts shareholders received £100 shares in the parent company for their existing shares, and the act also consolidated all of the previous legislation for both companies, with earlier acts of Parliament being repealed.

== Operation ==
Following completion, further acts were obtained. The Wilts and Berks Canal Act 1810 (50 Geo. 3. c. cxlviii) contained a small number of clauses concerning money, and a much more important clause altering conditions for the carriage of coal on the River Thames. When the Wilts and Berks Canal Act 1795 was passed, there had been opposition from merchants who brought coal by sea to London, and they had instigated a clause in that act banning the carriage of coal which had been conveyed by canal boats below Reading. The new act repealed this ban, moving the City coal limits to Staines, despite serious opposition from ship owners and the proprietors of collieries in the north-east of England. The Wilts and Berks Canal Navigation Act 1813 (53 Geo. 3. c. cxx), sought to resolve issues with water supply. When the canal opened, the main water supply was a deep well near Swindon, but this could not supply sufficient water for the canal's operation. The proprietors had constructed a feeder from the Ashbury Brook, but this had caused consternation among landowners, and the act was passed to prevent them extracting water from the Beckett Estate at Shrivenham, and to ensure that the feeder was filled in. A third act, the Wilts and Berks Canal Navigation Act 1815 (55 Geo. 3. c. vi), was passed in 1815 to allow the company to raise £100,000, which they used to pay off debts collected during the construction of the canal and to construct a reservoir. The act also allowed them to invest in the North Wilts Canal.

Outgoing traffic consisted of corn and agricultural products, collected from the rural communities bordering the canal and taken westwards to Bristol and Bath via the Kennet and Avon Canal. This amounted to 11,740 long tons (11,930 tonnes) in 1843. In the reverse direction, coal came from the Radstock and Paulton mines in the Somerset coalfield by way of the Somersetshire Coal Canal, which joined the Kennet and Avon Canal near the Dundas Aqueduct. In 1837, 43,642 long tons (44,342 tonnes) of coal were transported via the Wilts and Berks Canal from the Somerset coalfield, with 10,669 long tons (10,840 tonnes) being handled at Abingdon wharf. The Wilts and Berks Canal thus became a link in the chain of canals providing a transport route between the West Country and the Midlands. Water supply was always a problem and a reservoir was constructed near Swindon to supply the canal, now known as Coate Water. From the reservoir, a feeder meandered northwards and eastwards, to feed water into the canal near Marston Locks.

Income from tolls rose from £5,523 for the first year of operation to £12,877 in 1837, after which they were affected by railway building. The company paid a dividend to shareholders in 1812, but decided to forego any further payments until debts had been repaid, improvements made, and issues with water supply resolved. This was achieved by 1831, when dividend payments resumed. A total of £7,000 in dividends was paid in 1837, which only represented a return of about two per cent for the shareholders. Other major outgoings were repayments to the Exchequer Bill Loan Commissioners, for money borrowed to finance the construction of the North Wilts Canal. The final payment was made in 1839. Income rose significantly after 1838, as they canal carried materials for building railways, but decreased again from 1842 onwards. The company used the unexpected windfall to build hoses, buy a wharf at Oxford, construct Tockenham Reservoir, pay off loans, and retained the rest as reserves.

== Decline ==
Although the canal company had initially been dismissive of the threat from railway competition, and had benefitted from carrying materials for its construction, the Great Western Railway ran close to the canal from Abingdon to Swindon and Chippenham. When the railway opened in 1841, traffic fell sharply, apart from coal from the Somerset Coal Canal. Coal traffic on the western end of the canal rose between 1837 and 1847, but declined on the canal to the east of Swindon. Further rail competition occurred from 1848 with the opening of Wilts, Somerset and Weymouth Railway, which affected traffic on the western half of the canal. Traffic on the North Wilts branch also declined. A final dividend of £561 was paid in 1870, and in 1873 the canal made a loss; by that time all traffic to the east of Wantage had ceased. The Great Western Railway owned the Kennet and Avon Canal, and increased tolls for traffic to and from the Wilts and Berks, increasing the cost of coal carried on the canal. The company failed to interest the railway in buying the canal, and decided to close it.

Wilts and Berks Canal Act 1876 (Note: Section 1.)
- Act of Parliament
- Parliament of the United Kingdom
- Long title: An Act for incorporating the Wilts and Berks Canal Company for the transfer to them of the undertaking of the Wilts and Berks Canal Navigation and for other purposes.
- Citation: 39 & 40 Vict. c. lix
- Territorial extent: United Kingdom

Dates
- Royal assent: 27 June 1876
- Commencement: 27 June 1876
Other legislation
Amends	Wilts and Berks Canal Navigation Act 1821; Wilts and Berks Canal Navigation Act 1835

Status: Current legislation

Text of statute as originally enacted

Despite the decline, a group of shareholders were optimistic that matters could improve, and called a meeting on 4 September 1874. The meeting decided that closure was the best option, and drew up a bill in November to close or sell the canal. Bristol Chamber of Commerce objected to the proposal, and in late 1875 seven merchants formed a new company to buy the canal. The Wilts and Berks Canal Company obtained the Wilts and Berks Canal Act 1876 (39 & 40 Vict. c. lix) in June 1876, and paid £13,466 5s to the earlier company (the Company of Proprietors of the Wilts and Berks Canal Navigation) for the canal. They took control in early 1877, but in 1882 leased the canal to another group of merchants from Bristol for £1,250 per year. They experimented with sectional boats – similar to the Tom Pudding boats used on the Aire and Calder Canal – but they found them too difficult to manage, and narrow boats continued to be used. The new group failed to make a profit and in 1887 forfeited their lease. The 1876 company made another attempt at operating the canal.

Another group, the United Commercial Syndicate, took over the canal in 1891, and by 1896 had spent £16,000 putting the canal back into order. They decided that it could not be made profitable, and with support from the Swindon Traders Association, who thought the canal was an eyesore, attempted to abandon it. The Thames and Severn Canal were keen to take over the North Wilts branch, to allow them to access Swindon. There was opposition from landowners for whom the canal supplied water for cattle, and the abandonment failed on a technicality. A second attempt at abandonment was made in 1900, but an enquiry at Swindon by the Board of Trade resulted in the proposal being withdrawn. In 1901, one arch of Stanley Aqueduct, which carried the canal over the River Marden, collapsed, severing the canal. Swindon Corporation attempted to obtain an act to cut off the water supply to Coate Reservoir in 1904, but this failed. There was no traffic on the canal after 1906, and Swindon finally obtained an act of Parliament to close the canal in 1914.

Swindon Corporation (Wilts and Berks Canal Abandonment) Act 1914
- Act of Parliament
- Parliament of the United Kingdom
- Long title: An Act to authorise the transfer to the mayor aldermen and burgesses of the borough of Swindon of the site of portion of the Wilts and Berks Canal and the Coate Reservoir and the abandonment of the remainder of such canal and the sale or disposal of the site thereof and for other purposes.
- Citation: 4 & 5 Geo. 5. c. cviii
- Territorial extent: United Kingdom

Dates
- Royal assent: 31 July 1914
- Commencement: 31 July 1914
Other legislation
Amends	Wilts and Berks Canal Navigation Act 1821
Amended by	Local Government Board's Provisional Order Confirmation (No. 4) Act 1919; Swindon Corporation Act 1926; Ministry of Health Provisional Order Confirmation (Swindon Extension) Act 1928; SI 1949/1802; Swindon Corporation Act 1951

Status: Amended

Text of statute as originally enacted

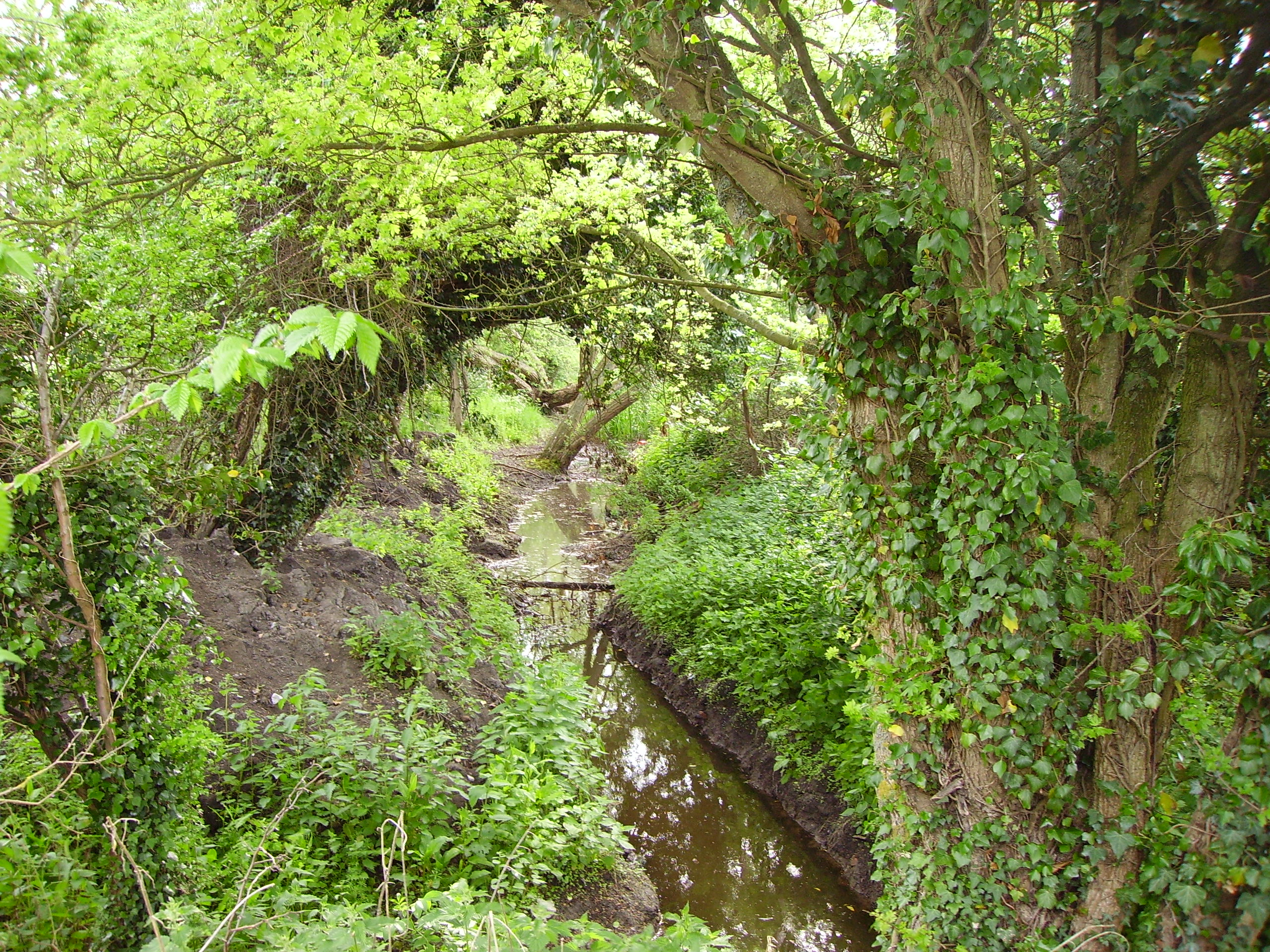
Overgrown section of the canal, west of Wantage, in 2006

The Swindon Corporation (Wilts and Berks Canal Abandonment) Act 1914 (4 & 5 Geo. 5. c. cviii) enabled the corporation to take over Coate Reservoir, now known as Coate Water, for recreational purposes, as it had been used for recreation since the 1870s, and they also obtained land for public purposes. They paid £8,000 to the canal company, who also sold what land they could to meet their debts.

From the early 1930s, much of the canal was filled in and generally used for dumping rubbish. Chippenham Wharf, once home to Brinkworth's Coal Depot, was used by residents as a refuse tip, and council minutes from 1926 show a decision to dump pig offal in the disused waterway. A bus station was built on the site, the buried wharf being uncovered briefly during redevelopment in 2006.

During the Second World War, many of the locks and other canal structures were used for army exercises and damaged by explosives.

Very little of the old canal survived in usable form, but long rural stretches are clearly delineated.

== Restoration ==
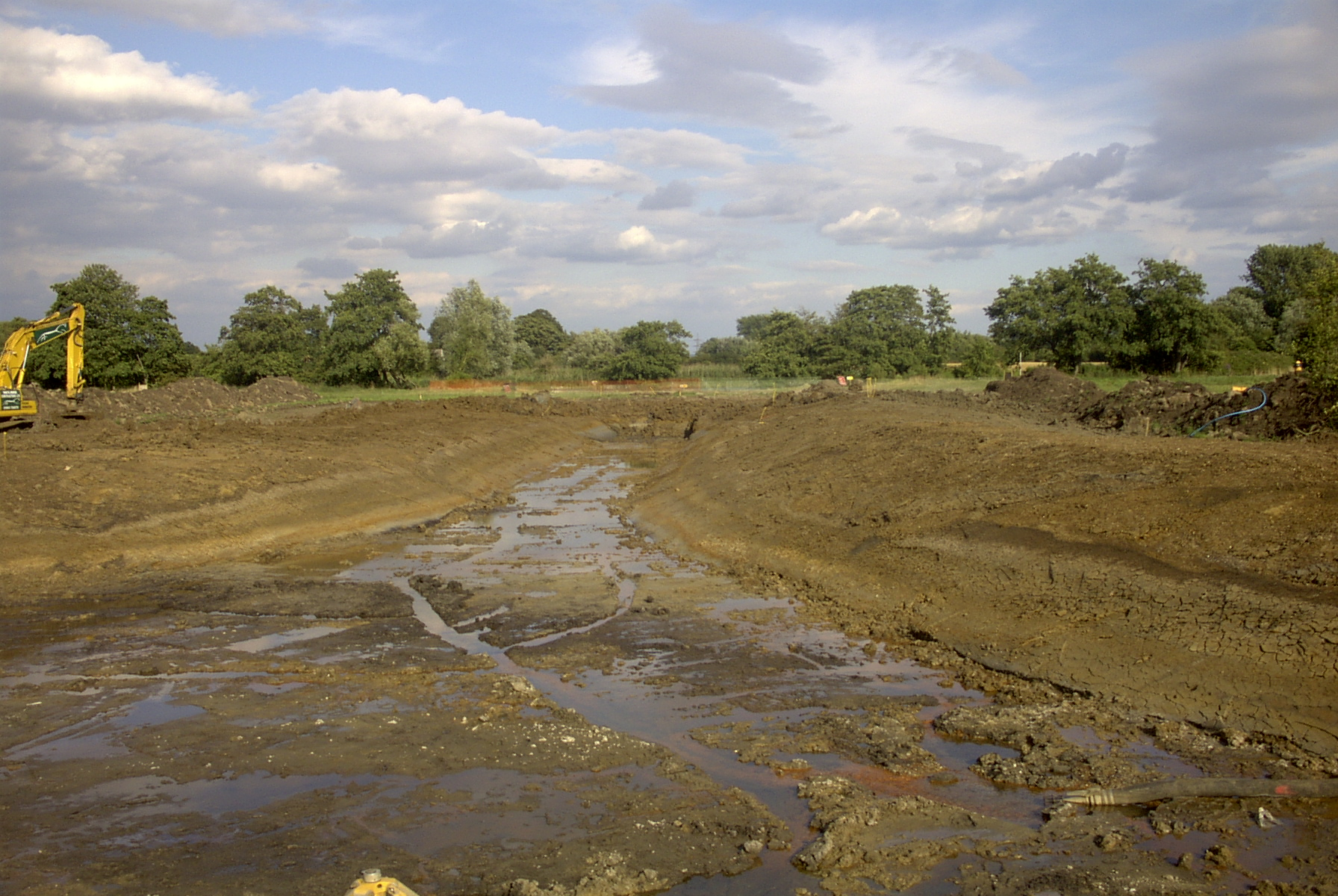
The new link to the Thames under construction

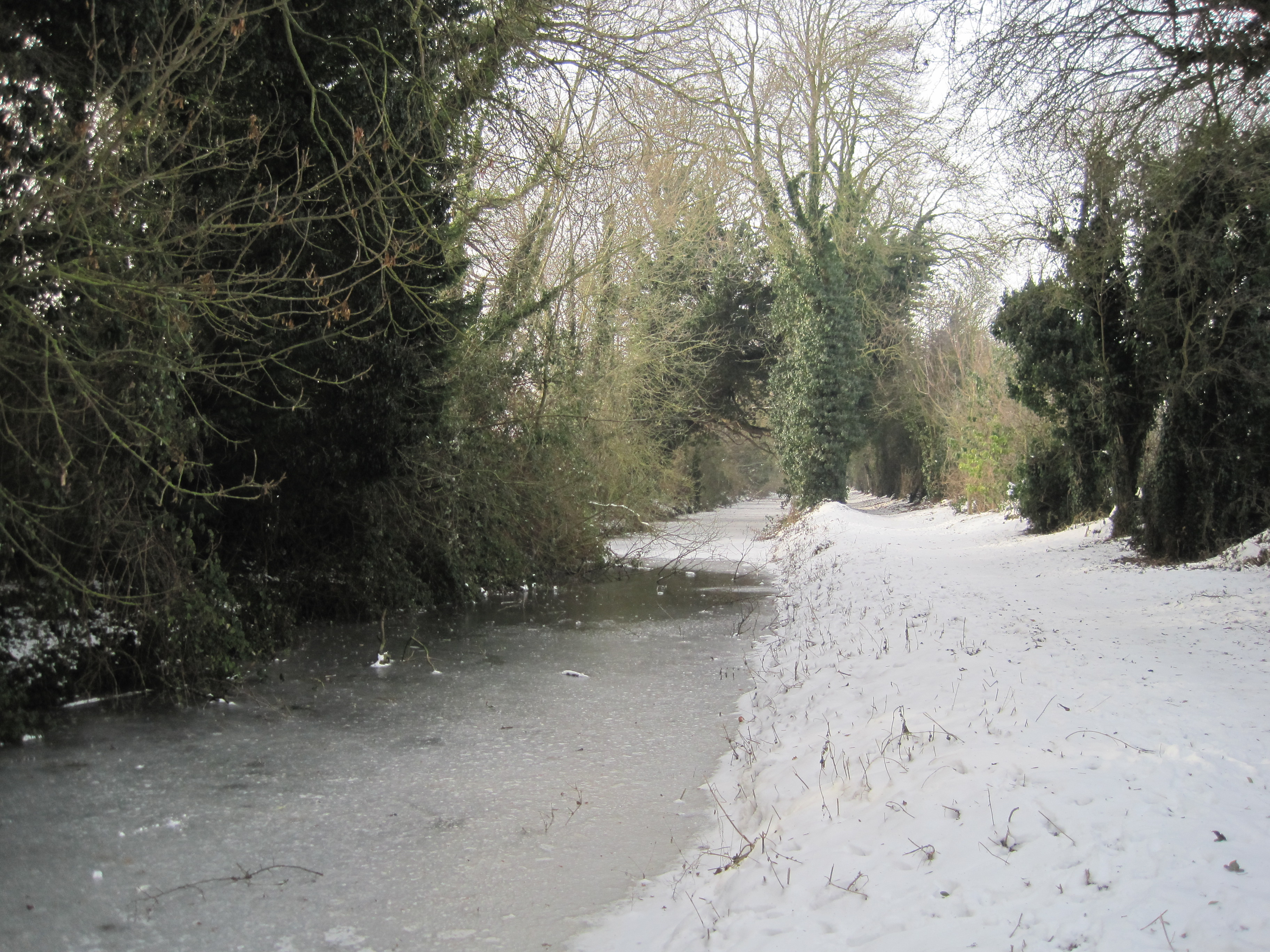
The canal near Grove frozen in December 2010

In 1977, the Wilts & Berks Canal Amenity Group was formed to protect what remained of the canal, and to restore short sections for their amenity value. Their first projects included the clearing of sections at Kingshill, Shrivenham, Dauntsey and Wootton Bassett. Between 1977 and 1987, there was a significant increase in public awareness of derelict canals and enthusiasm for their restoration. The aims of the Amenity Group therefore changed, from limited conservation to full restoration of the canal.

The Wilts & Berks Canal Trust was formed in 1997 as a partnership between the Amenity Group and the district and county councils covering the route of the canal, namely the district councils of North Wilts, West Wilts and Vale of White Horse, the county councils of Oxfordshire and Wiltshire, and Swindon Borough Council. The aims of the trust were to protect, conserve and improve the canal and its branches, with the ultimate aim of restoring the whole canal to navigable status. However, the legal structure of the group was unsuitable for accessing some of the grants available for canal restoration, and so it was reformed into the Wilts & Berks Canal Partnership in 2001. In 2012 it was renamed as The Wiltshire, Swindon and Oxfordshire Canal Partnership, to reflect the local authority areas through which the canal runs.

While much of the line of the canal is still traceable in the rural areas, significant sections of it have been built over where it passed through towns. With all of the local authorities participating in the Wiltshire, Swindon and Oxfordshire Canal Partnership, the "line" of the canal has been preserved in Local Development Plans, ensuring that no new building or development should take place on the former route. Following closure, large sections of the route have passed into private ownership with no rights of public access.

Since 1988, the trust have worked on restoring small sections of the route as access has become available, or permissive access has been granted by landowners. A significant event was the organisation of a "Big Dig" in 1991 by the Waterway Recovery Group to celebrate their twenty-first year of involvement in canal restoration. Over 1,000 navvies arrived for a weekend of work, and they cleared nearly two miles of canal bed near Wantage, raising local awareness of plans for the canal. One of the first sections to be rewatered was at Templars Firs on the southern edge of Royal Wootton Bassett, where a 0.75-mile (1.2 km) section was restored in 1995; the reopened section was used for a trail boat festival in 1996. Further progress was hampered by a sewage pipe crossing the waterway, which was re-routed below the canal in 1988 by Wessex Water. The pound was extended to 1 mile (1.6 km) and another trail boat festival in 1988 was attended by 50 boats. East of here, after a short unrestored section where the towpath is a public right of way but the canal bed is owned by a farmer, the Studley Grange section was opened in 2018 after agreement was reached with Biffa, the waste disposal company, who agreed to a 125-year lease. Funding to remove the refuse from the canal came from a Town and Country Planning Act 1990 section 106 agreement.

The connection of the canal with the River Thames at Abingdon had been lost to development. A new connection with the river further downstream near Culham Lock was created on 30 August 2006, when Jubilee Junction was completed. The cut initially runs for about 150 yards (140 m) to a winding hole, but will eventually link to the historic route of the canal to the west of Abingdon. Final decisions on the route in this area have not been made, pending a decision on whether or not a new water-supply reservoir will be built near Abingdon, which would cover further sections of the original route to the south west of the town.

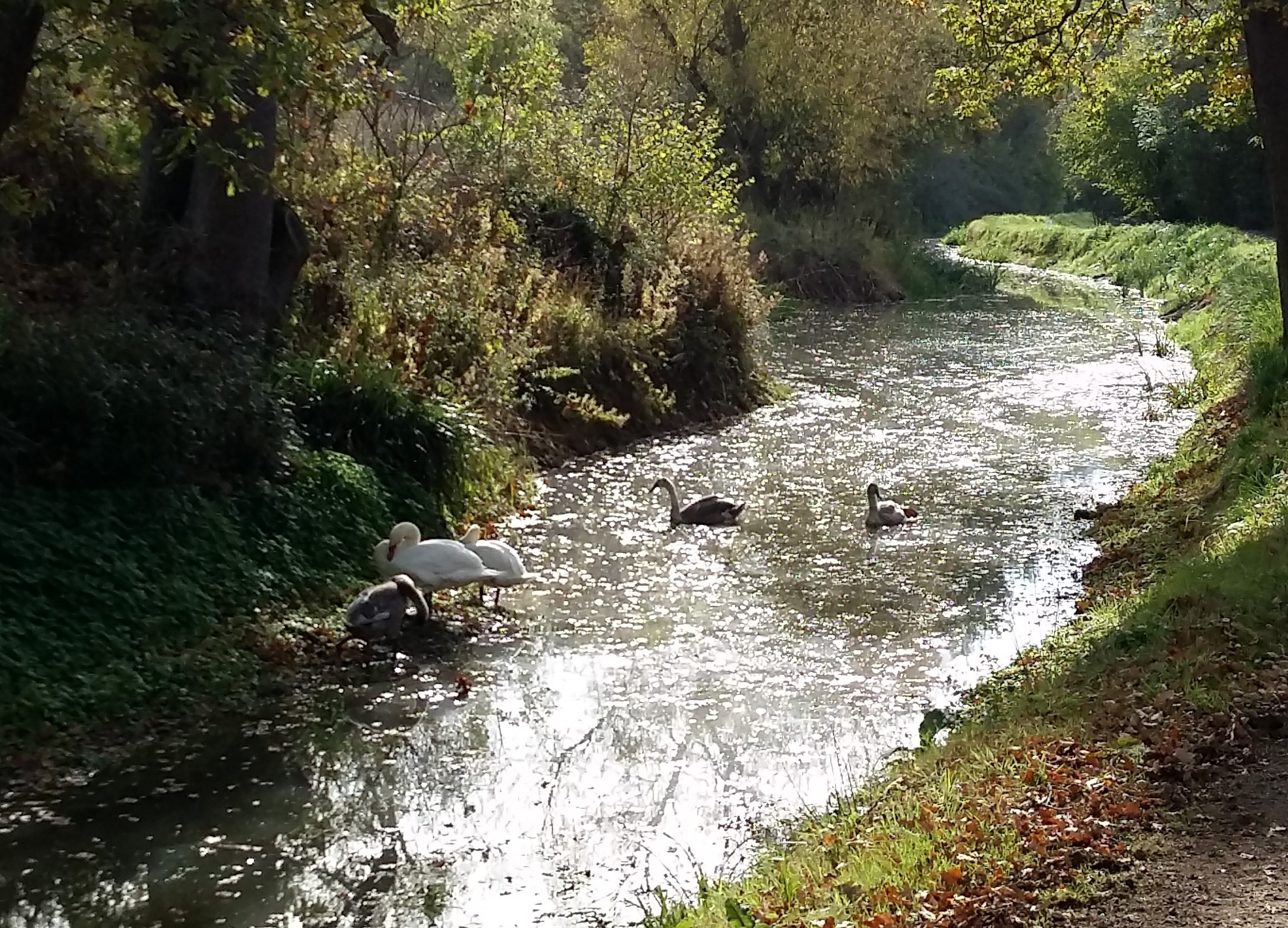
A stretch near Chippenham (Pewsham section)

On 26 May 2009, Double Bridge and a short section of rewatered canal to the south of Pewsham was officially opened by the Trust's patron, Camilla, Duchess of Cornwall. With a grant from the Gannett Foundation and voluntary labour, working parties extended this section to the foot of Pewsham Locks in 2012.

At Swindon the canal used to run northwards to the town centre, where the North Wilts Canal continued running northwards and the main line ran eastwards towards Shrivenham. The route to the east has been built over, and a new route which runs parallel to the M4 motorway along the southern edge of Swindon and then turns northwards along its eastern edge has been proposed. The council have found a route for the North Wilts branch which runs close to or re-uses the original route. In 2007, a feasibility study suggested that the proposal to construct a canal through Swindon would cost £50m. Despite some objections, Swindon Borough Council gave approval in 2008 for further investigation of the scheme. The Thames Valley Chamber of Commerce Group also welcomed the project "as a key element in transforming Swindon's town centre into a leisure and visitor attraction, disposing of its dreary reputation."

750 acres (300 ha) of land between the town and the M4 motorway were designated as the site of a new housing development in 2006, and the project to build some 4,500 homes known collectively as Wichelstowe is a joint venture between the council, Barrett Homes and David Wilson Homes. The architect for the whole scheme was John Simpson, who also worked on Poundbury near Dorchester. The first stage at East Wichel, providing some 800 houses as well as a new lock and length of canal, was completed in 2009. A second length of canal known as the Rushey Platt section, restored in the 1990s, is part of the canalside development. It runs southwards from Cross Kingshill Road, part of the A4289 near the centre of Swindon, to a Waitrose supermarket and a waterways-themed Hall & Woodhouse pub, the interior of which was designed by the archaeologist Mark Horton. In addition to building housing and the canal, the developers by 2024 had planted 376 trees in urban streets and 34,336 in open areas. They had also installed 307 bird boxes and 89 bat boxes.

There were problems with leakage on the East Wichel section, which were largely resolved in 2022, but work was ongoing in 2023 to locate the final leaks. Planning permission for further development in Middle Wichel and West Wichel was granted in late 2022. This included the construction of another length of canal to join the Rushey Platt and East Wichel sections. It will include a swing bridge to carry the towpath from the west side of the Rushey Platt section to the north side of the section to East Wichel. Progress southwards from the swing bridge junction is blocked by the M4 motorway, but spurred on by the award of £4 million to the Stroudwater Navigation for two bridges under the A38 road from Highways England, the Partnership applied to Highways England, and were awarded £42,000 for a Stage 1 feasibility study. They were hopeful that this would lead to full funding for a new bridge under the motorway further to the west, to link up with the Studley Grange section, but were notified in November 2022 that they had not been awarded a Stage 2 grant of £870,000 to fund a detailed feasibility study and planning permission application.

Swindon is also expanding to the east, in a development called the New Eastern Villages. The planned new route of the canal runs through the development area, and it is probable that creation of further sections of the canal will be included in the project. Elsewhere, in the early 1990s, the Wilts and Berks Canal Company was formed and bought two miles of the canal spanning Dauntsey Lock. Their primary objective was to refurbish a row of derelict cottages beside the canal, which they did, but they also restored the canal and the lock, helped by volunteers from the Canal Trust. In 2017, the Wessex Waterways Restoration Trust was formed, with similar aims to the Canal Trust. They aim to complement the Canal Trust, working on parts of the canal restoration where the Canal Trust are not active.

In Melksham, where much of the route has been lost to housing, Melksham Town Council agreed in 2012 to support plans to route the canal through the River Avon in the centre of town, involving construction of 2 miles (3.2 km) of new waterway, with a towpath and cycleway which would create recreational opportunities. The plans were submitted to Wiltshire Council in August 2012, but the Trust were required to produce supporting documentation. The environmental statement ran to 350,000 words and was published in five volumes in 2015, but the Environment Agency required further information, and supplementary reports were produced in March 2018 and January 2019. After delays caused by the COVID-19 pandemic, communication with the Environment Agency resumed, and agreement on the final two obstacles to the plan was reached. Details were submitted for planning approval in early 2022.

== Restoration issues ==
There is some controversy about the restoration of the canal, in particular the felling of trees and the corresponding short-term disruption of wildlife habitats that have evolved in the 100 or so years since the canal was abandoned, and this has been addressed in the North Wiltshire Local Plan. For the Melksham link, planning documents indicate that there will be a net gain in habitat, including standing water, marginal wetland habitat and the planting of new lengths of hedgerow. Where trees have to be removed, new trees will be planted to replace them.

Objections to a canal route through Swindon town centre prior to 2010 were believed to arise from a misconception that canals contained "stagnant water". However canals are permanently moving water slowly downstream, and are thus not stagnant. The passage of boats keeps the water stirred up making it muddy-looking, but this is required to prevent the growth of weeds. In January 2008 Swindon Council considered a report, prepared by their consultants, on the feasibility and implications of restoring the town centre route. They endorsed the proposal, and set up a task group to make further progress.

There was concern in south Oxfordshire about the risk of flooding, and it can be argued that the canal will act as a drainage system, helping to take excess water and move it away to the Thames. The Environment Agency expressed concerns about the proposed route of the canal at Melksham, and its effect on the floodplain, and there were calls from local landowners to ensure that a town-centre route was re-established.

== Map of route ==
Point	Coordinates (Links to map resources)	OS Grid Ref	Notes
Jubilee Junction	51.651°N 1.282°W	SU496949	junction with River Thames
Wantage	51.596°N 1.438°W	SU384887	
Shrivenham	51.590°N 1.662°W	SU234880	
Cricklade	51.657°N 1.876°W	SU104945	junction with Thames and Severn Canal
approximate midpoint	51.549°N 1.805°W	SU135834	junction with North Wilts Canal
Seven Locks	51.526°N 1.971°W	SU201808	
Stanley Junction	51.452°N 2.058°W	ST959726	junction with Calne branch
Semington Junction	51.348°N 2.146°W	ST898610	junction with Kennet & Avon Canal

== See also ==
- Canals of Great Britain
- History of the British canal system

== Bibliography ==
- Child, Mark (2002). Swindon : An Illustrated History. United Kingdom: Breedon Books Publishing. ISBN 978-1-85983-322-3.
- Clew, Kenneth R. (1970). The Somersetshire Coal Canal and Railways. Newton Abbot: David and Charles. ISBN 978-0-7153-4792-8.
- Cumberlidge, Jane (2009). Inland Waterways of Great Britain (8th Ed.). Imray Laurie Norie and Wilson. ISBN 978-1-84623-010-3.
- Dalby, L.J. (2000) [1971]. The Wilts and Berks Canal (3rd ed.). Usk: Oakwood Press. ISBN 978-0-85361-562-0.
- Denny, Andrew (June 2019). "A walk through Swindon's front garden". Waterways World. ISSN 0309-1422.
- Hadfield, Charles (1969). The Canals of South and South-East England. David & Charles. ISBN 978-0-7153-4693-8.
- Ludgate, Martin (13 December 2021). "The Wilts & Berks Canal restoration: 15 years on". Canal Boat. Archived from the original on 20 February 2024.
- Priestley, Joseph (1831). "Historical Account of the Navigable Rivers, Canals, and Railways of Great Britain". Archived from the original on 13 March 2016.
- Skempton, A. W., ed. (2002). A Biographical Dictionary of Civil Engineers in Great Britain and Ireland. Thomas Telford. ISBN 978-0-7277-2939-2.
- Small, Doug (1999). The Wilts & Berks Canal. Stroud: Tempus Publishing. ISBN 978-0-7524-1619-9.
- Small, Doug (2010). Wilts and Berks Canal Revisited. Stroud: The History Press. ISBN 978-0-7524-5146-6.
- Small, Doug (2012). Wilts & Berks Canal Through Time. Stroud: Amberley Publishing. ISBN 978-1-4456-0952-2.

Next confluence upstream	River Thames	Next confluence downstream
River Ock (south)	Wilts and Berks Canal	River Thame (north)
