= Inglesham =

Village in Wiltshire, England

Coordinates: 51.684°N 1.704°W

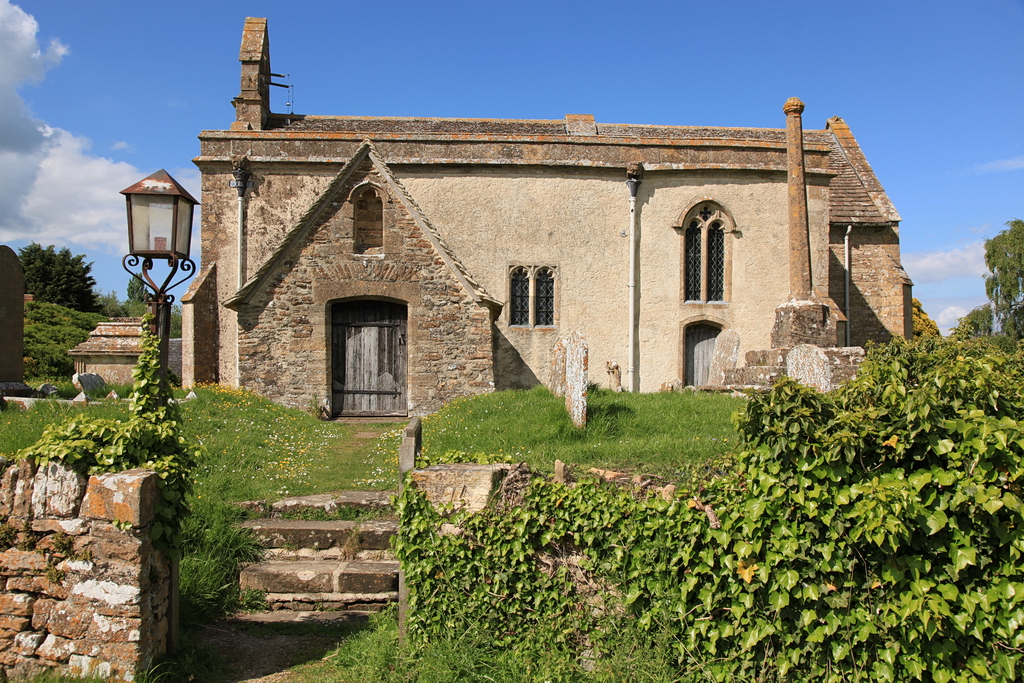
- St John the Baptist Church, Inglesham

- Location within Wiltshire
- Population: 112 (in 2021)
- OS grid reference: SU206984
- Civil parish: Inglesham
- Unitary authority: Swindon
- Ceremonial county: Wiltshire
- Region: South West
- Country: England
- Sovereign state: United Kingdom
- Post town: Swindon
- Postcode district: SN6
- Dialling code: 01367
- Police: Wiltshire
- Fire: Dorset and Wiltshire
- Ambulance: South Western
- UK Parliament: Swindon North

Inglesham is a small village and civil parish in the Borough of Swindon, Wiltshire, England, notable for the Grade-I listed St John the Baptist Church. The village is just off the A361 road about 1 mile (1.6 km) south-west of Lechlade in Gloucestershire. Most of the population lives in the hamlet of Upper Inglesham, which is on the main road about 1.3 miles (2 km) south of the village.

The parish forms the extreme north-east corner of the Borough of Swindon and County of Wiltshire, and is bounded to the west and north by the River Thames (which also forms the county boundary with Gloucestershire), and to the east by the county boundary with Oxfordshire (Berkshire until the 1974 boundary changes). The River Cole forms part of the eastern boundary.

As the parish's population is small, it has a parish meeting instead of a parish council.

The Round House, Inglesham is often used by boaters as a landmark to denote the westernmost point most cabin cruisers and narrowboats can travel along the Thames, as beyond Inglesham the river becomes too clogged with vegetation and too shallow to effectively navigate.

== Parish church ==
The 13th-century parish church of St John the Baptist was restored in 1888–89 and is listed Grade I. The benefice and parish were united with Highworth in 1940. The church was declared redundant in 1980, and is now cared for by the Churches Conservation Trust.

In the churchyard is a Grade II* listed 15th-century stone cross. The base and shaft survive but the cross itself has been lost.

Before the Dissolution of the Monasteries, the Cistercian Beaulieu Abbey held the manor and benefice.

== Secular history ==
Until 1844 Inglesham was a detached part of Berkshire. It was transferred to Wiltshire by the Counties (Detached Parts) Act 1844.

Church Farmhouse is a former watermill that was rebuilt in the 17th century and is listed Grade II*. Several other houses in the parish are listed Grade II, as are the late 18th-century Halfpenny Bridge that carries the A361 across the Thames into Lechlade, and a Cotswold stone rubble barn at College Farm built in about 1800.

Inglesham lock is at the eastern end of the Thames and Severn Canal and the Cotswold Canals Trust is currently raising funds to restore its structure and part of the canal. The Round House was the lock keeper's cottage.

== See also ==
- HMS Inglesham (M2601)

== Sources ==
- Garside, Helen (2005). Inglesham Parish (PDF). Swindon: Swindon Borough Council.
- Hockey, S.F., ed. (1974). The Beaulieu Cartulary. Southampton Records Series. Vol. XVII. Southampton: Southampton University Press. p. 259.
- Pevsner, Nikolaus; Cherry, Bridget (1975) [1963]. The Buildings of England: Wiltshire (revised ed.). Harmondsworth: Penguin Books. pp. 276–277. ISBN 0140710264.
