= Cotswold Canals Trust =

UK waterways charity

- Founded: 1972
- Type: Charity, waterway society
- Purpose: Stroudwater Navigation; Thames and Severn Canal
- Location: Stroud, Gloucestershire
- Coordinates: 51.74435°N 2.22080°W
- Region served: Gloucestershire, Wiltshire
- Services: Charitable services
- Website: cotswoldcanals.org.uk
- Formerly called: Stroudwater Canal Society; Stroudwater, Thames and Severn Canal Trust

The Cotswold Canals Trust is a British registered charity that aims to protect and restore the Stroudwater Navigation and the Thames and Severn Canal. Formed in 1972, the organisation has a goal to restore navigability on the two waterways between Saul Junction and the River Thames. Since then, it has overseen restoration of the waterways, with many bridges, locks, and cuttings being rebuilt and reinstated.

== History ==
The Stroudwater Canal Society was formed in 1972 by Michael Ayland, a canal enthusiast who lived near Saul Junction, the intersection of the Stroudwater Navigation and the Gloucester and Sharpness Canal. Ayland was opposed to the infilling of the Stroudwater Navigation, and after speaking to a Bristol Evening Post journalist he gathered significant support and offers of assistance from members of the public. The Company of Proprietors of the Stroudwater Navigation, the primary landowner of the waterway, denied a newspaper report that suggested the navigation would be restored to Stroud.

The society's first official meeting was held on 12 May 1972 at the Subscription Rooms in Stroud and in its infancy the society formalised its goals to also include the restoration of the Thames and Severn Canal to provide a navigable link between Saul Junction and Lechlade on the River Thames. On 16 April 1975, the organisation was incorporated as the Stroudwater, Thames and Severn Canal Trust and on 23 July it became a registered charity. The organisation began using the name "Cotswold Canals Trust" in 1990; (Note: Cotswold Canals Trust (Trading) Limited was incorporated in 1994, although The Cotswold Canal Trust itself did not officially change its name until August 2003) at this point its aims were to preserve and promote recreational use of the canals, to seek to have the towpath defined as a public right of way, to promote the restoration of the waterways between Saul Junction and Hope Mill Lock (near Thrupp), to promote the restoration of the Thames and Severn Canal between the Thames and the Cotswold Water Park, and ultimately to restore the entirety of the canals between Saul Junction and the Thames. The Trust's current aims are similar, but also include focus on wildlife and landscape conservation as well as navigability and recreation. Their governing document – as submitted to the Charity Commission for England and Wales – covers the preservation and maintenance of the waterways; the promotion of the use of the navigations by the public; education of the history, use, and wildlife of the navigations; the provision of recreational and leisure facilities on the navigations; and the furtherment and enhancement of environmental aspects along the waterways.

In 2021, the charity was awarded the Queen's Award for Voluntary Service for "regenerating a 36-mile [58 km] canal corridor, engaging communities and reviving heritage and wildlife".

== Operations ==
=== Restoration ===
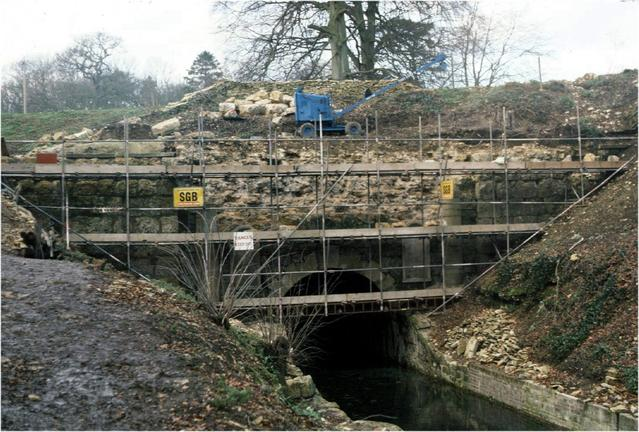
The Coates portal of the Sapperton Tunnel during its restoration in 1976

After the canals' abandonment, roughly 9 miles (14 km) of the waterways were infilled. (Note: Only infilled stretches longer than 50 metres (160 ft) are documented) The Sapperton Tunnel was impassable, having suffered numerous roof falls, and both its ornate portals had fallen into dereliction. Early work by the Trust included the restoration of the tunnel's southern portal at Coates, which took place between 1976 and 1977. (Note: The Trow wrote that some masonry work may have continued into early 1979) Restoration of the tunnel's north portal at Daneway was completed in 1996,

Much of the charity's early work focussed on work parties undertaking various tasks including digging silt and renovating copings at the lock chambers. In the late 1970s and early 1980s, a number of locks and bridges were restored, including Blunder Lock on the Stroudwater Navigation and Cerney Wick Lock on the Thames and Severn Canal. Obstructions to the waterways' restoration also included the A38 and the A419 roads, which were built after the canals were abandoned. The M5 motorway also bisects the route of the Stroudwater Navigation; the waterway is planned to pass beneath the motorway using the same channel as the River Frome. When the A419 Cricklade bypass was built in 1997, the Trust was able to have an underpass built in prospect of a restored canal.

In 2001, British Waterways and The Waterways Trust released a report and feasibility study in which they stated that canal restoration brings social, economic, and environmental benefits, and British Waterways stated that "historic waterways in the Cotswolds, abandoned for half a century, will be restored back to full use". Following this, the Cotswold Canals Trust – as part of the "Cotswold Canals Partnership" along with British Waterways – began to develop plans to restore the waterways. Of the 9 miles (14 km) of infilled canal, so far approximately 3/4 mile (1.2 km) has been reinstated.

==== Phase 1A and 1B ====
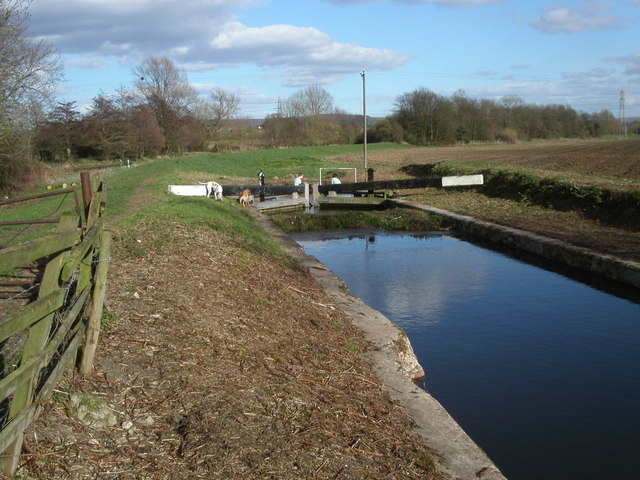
The partly restored Whitminster Lock on the Stroudwater Navigation, beyond which the cut is infilled

Originally grouped as Phase 1, these phases outline the restoration of the Stroudwater Navigation between Saul Junction and The Ocean (a basin near Stonehouse Court), and from there to Brimscombe Port. An application for funding for Phase 1 was declined by the Heritage Lottery Fund (HLF), citing its complexity; the phase was subsequently divided into two schemes and in 2006 HLF funding was secured. In September that year, vegetation clearance as part of Phase 1A began at Gough's Orchard Lock. Groundwork began the following year and was completed in 2018. The phase included the re-cutting of 1.3 miles (2.1 km) of canal, as well as the restoration and rebuilding of locks, bridges, and weirs.

In 2008, British Waterways withdrew from the restoration scheme, with Stroud District Council taking their place.

Phase 1B is currently in progress, with work to construct a new channel beneath the A38–A419 Whitminster roundabout being completed in November 2020. Completion of Phase 1B necessitates the recutting of the "Missing Mile", a 1-mile-long (1.6 km) stretch infilled when the M5 was built. In late 2020, the Trust secured an £8.9 million HLF grant to allow continued restoration of the Stroudwater Navigation, allowing the already-restored waterway at Stonehouse to connect to the national waterways network at Saul Junction.

==== Phase 2 ====
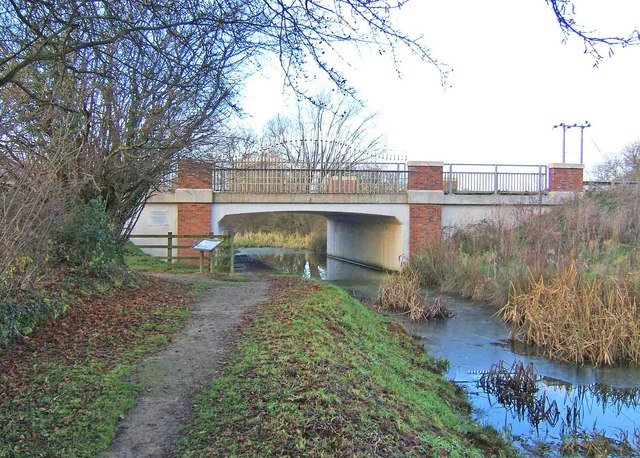
The 2004 Gateway Bridge at South Cerney was built with sufficient clearance for navigation

Phase 2 covers the Thames and Severn Canal from Gateway Bridge at South Cerney to the canal's junction with the Thames at Inglesham. The Gateway Bridge was constructed in 2004 to replace an obstruction on the canal dating from the construction of the Cotswold Water Park in the 1970s. One of the major obstacles to the restoration on this section is private landownership; the riparian landowner of part of the canal bed near Dudgrove is strongly opposed to its restoration and one of the Trust's directors has described the response of landowning farmers to the canal's restoration as "volatile".

Much of the work for Phase 2 is restoration of bridges and locks, as well as infilled cut near Kempsford.

==== Phase 3 ====
The final phase of restoration, between Brimscombe Port and South Cerney, includes the 3,817-yard-long (3,490 m) Sapperton Tunnel as well as 30 locks that raise the canal to its summit pound. The restoration of the tunnel is expected to be the single most expensive and complex aspect of the canal's restoration.

=== The Trow ===
The Trust publishes a quarterly magazine, The Trow, which takes its name from the Severn trow vessels and features a depiction of a trow in its masthead. The first issue of the magazine was published in February 1973, and carried news that the society had approximately 200 members.

=== Visitor attractions ===
In 1986, the organisation ran two trip boats on the watered section of the Thames and Severn Canal between Stroud and Bowbridge. Two working boats – punts Aline and Bell of Wallbridge – were used. The following year, the trip boats were relocated to the pound between the locks at Bowbridge and Griffin's Mill, and in 1988 a trip boat was operating from Stonehouse. At one point, the Trust operated a trip boat into the southern end of the Sapperton Tunnel; the trips ended in 2005 when bats were discovered to be roosting in the tunnel. An agreement between the Trust and English Nature in 2006 sought to reinstate the trips from 2007 onwards.

The Trust now has four trip boats – Adventure on the Gloucester and Sharpness Canal at Saul, Perseverance and Endeavour on the Stroudwater Navigation at Ebley, and Inglesham on the Thames at Lechlade.

The Trust operates visitor centres at Saul Junction, Bond's Mill in Stonehouse, and Wallbridge in Stroud. In 2016, the Trust opened a bookshop in Brimscombe. The shop moved to a new location in 2021.

== Governance ==
The Cotswold Canals Trust is administered by a board of trustees and by a board of directors. The Trust has had a number of notable vice presidents and honorary members, including Robert Aickman, Sir John Knill, Peter Gadsden, and Mark Horton.

A number of serving or former local Members of Parliament have also held these positions, including Sir Anthony Kershaw, Roger Knapman, Geoffrey Clifton-Brown, Richard Needham, Neil Carmichael, David Drew, and Siobhan Baillie.
