= Lengthsman =

The term Lengthsman was coined in the 1700s in a concept rooted in the Tudor Era as far back as War of the Roses and enclosure. Originally, it referred to someone who kept a "length" of road neat, tidy and passable in the Middle Ages, with particular emphasis on boundary marking. Lengthsmen were used on canals and railways from the beginnings of both. On land, lengthsmen might be responsible for a few miles between adjacent villages and especially on commonage. Employed originally by the 'Lords of the Manor' and latterly by parish councils, they would keep grass and weeds down in verges, keep drainage ditches clear and repair fences. Litter, such as it was in those times, was cleared and instances are recorded of wild flowers being planted and tended.

== The 21st century lengthsman ==
Lengthsmen are still employed on land by some parish councils (or groups of councils to enable financing) but security of tenure is tenuous (e.g. Wyre Council employed a lengthsman at Kepple Lane in 2011). In 2003 Worcestershire County Council piloted a scheme which ran until 2006. Lengthsman tasks on land in the 21st century are/were biased towards tending areas of a central "common" or greens and minor drainage matters. The term was picked up by [the English organisation] National Parks of England and Wales who used volunteers with specific rural skills to engage on "special projects" including hedge-laying and wall-building and sometimes training or familiarising "untrained" volunteers. As of 2016 there is no mention of lengthsmen on the National Parks website. Since 2018 Shenstone Parish Council in Staffordshire has employed a Lengthsman on a 2 days per week basis to keep its 3 Wards of Shenstone, Stonnall and Little Aston clear of litter, its verges trimmed and tidy, maintain ditches and make repairs to bus-shelters, benches fences and footpaths. This has proven far more cost effective and resulted in far speedier conclusion of work than going through the usual system of contracting though or via the higher tiers such as the District or County Council. Riccall Parish Council, North Yorkshire. employ a Lengthsman to help out on routine Maintenance around the village. Nov 2020 ref: Parish Annual Report. Morley Town Council, West Yorkshire, make a regular monthly payment for "Lengthman Operations" around the town.

== The lengthsman on canals ==
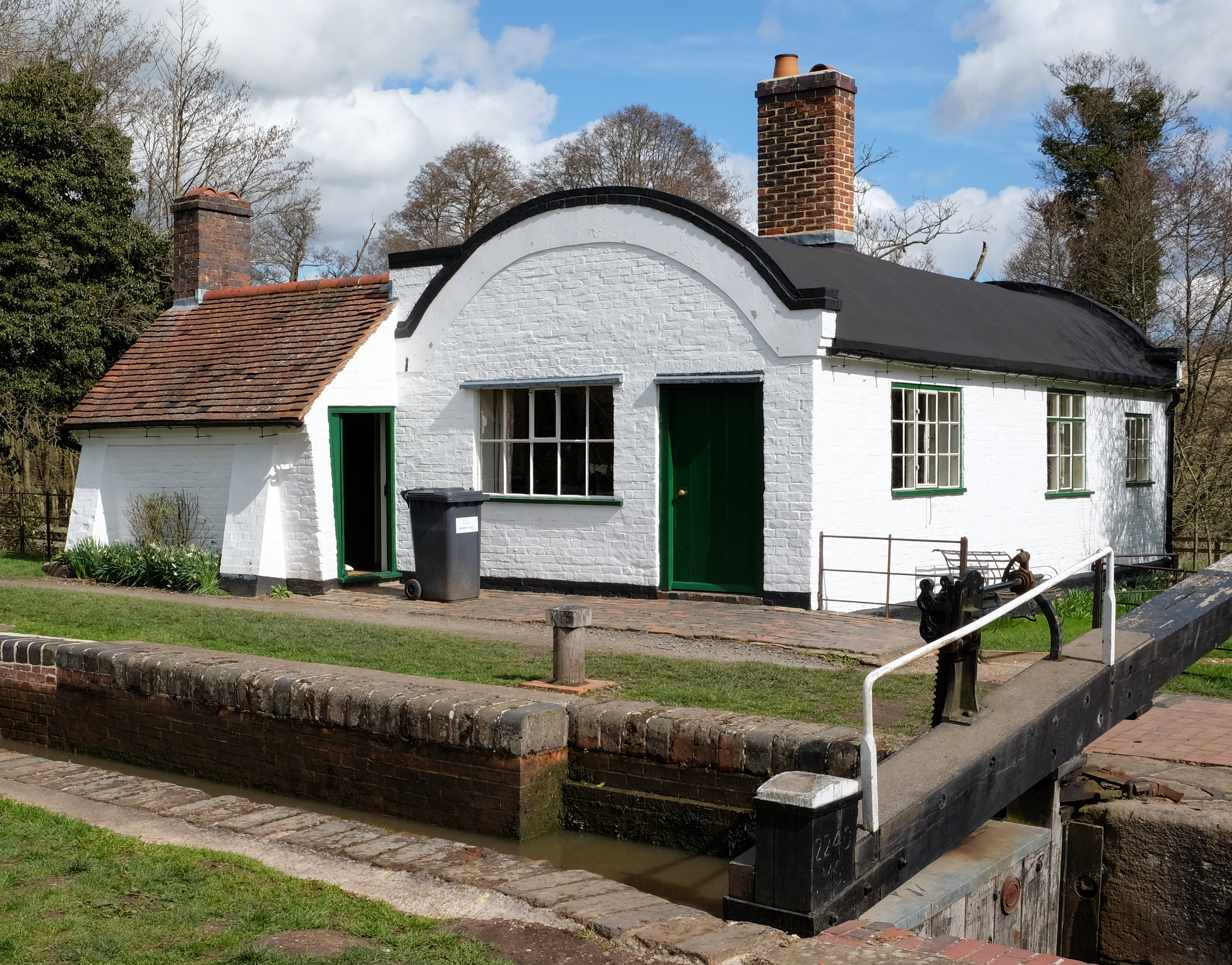
A lengthsman's cottage on the Stratford-upon-Avon Canal in Lowsonford in 2016

Lengthsmen were used specifically on the English canal system from its inception in the late 18th century, being responsible especially for lengths of towpath and, in the absence of a lock-keeper, for locks, their trappings and surroundings. Many earlier lengthsmen were accommodated in isolated cottages which, if close to a lock, might include lock-keeper duties, including management of water levels and control of weirs. Canal lengthsmen were also responsible for repair and maintenance of banks on their "length", including cutting reeds and vegetation and treading puddle clay into sections of bank which were weak or suffering from leakage.

A feature of the Thames and Severn Canal was the provision of accommodation specifically for lengthsmen. These buildings were circular and had three floors. Five examples, dating from the 1790s, remain to this day. This includes cottages at Chalford and Lowsonford (illustrated alongside).

== The Grand Union lengthsmen ==
Through the winter of 2015/16, Grand Union Canal milestones between Brentford and Braunston had their GPS coordinates recorded by a volunteer lengthsman en route between the terminals, as a "Special Lengthsman Project" and about forty had a daffodil bulb dug in alongside, for future identification.

Potential GU lengthsman groups and individuals were identified en route at the Slough Arm, at Coxley, Stoke Breurne and Blisworth. Active teams operate on the Slough Arm of the Grand Union Canal and the southern reaches of the Grand Union Canal. Croxley Green on the Herts Berks borders was involved through Croxley Green Parish Council via their "Towpath Taskforce" endeavour in liaison with the Canal & River Trust.

== Bibliography ==
- McKnight, Hugh (1987). The Shell Book of Inland Waterways. David & Charles. ISBN 0-7153-8239-X.
- Corrie, Euan (1998). Tales from the OLD INLAND WATERWAYS. David & Charles. ISBN 0-7153-0542-5.
