= Latton, Wiltshire =

Village in Wiltshire, England

Coordinates: 51.660°N 1.867°W

Latton
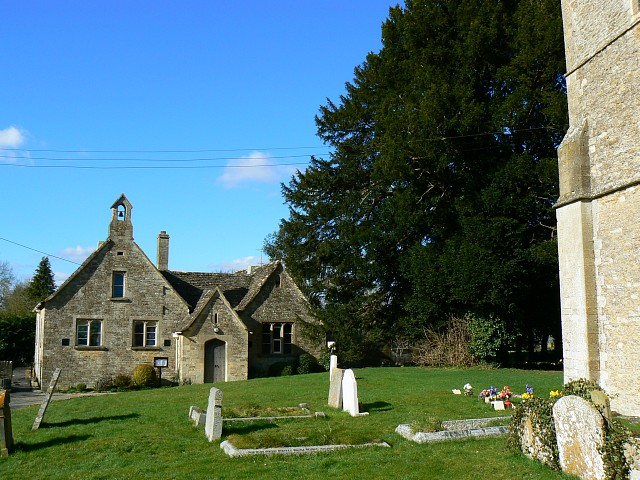
- Churchyard and former school, Latton

- Location within Wiltshire
- Population: 548 (in 2011)
- OS grid reference: ST093957
- Civil parish: Latton
- Unitary authority: Wiltshire
- Ceremonial county: Wiltshire
- Region: South West
- Country: England
- Sovereign state: United Kingdom
- Post town: Swindon
- Postcode district: SN6
- Dialling code: 01793
- Police: Wiltshire
- Fire: Dorset and Wiltshire
- Ambulance: South Western
- UK Parliament: South Cotswolds
- Website: Parish Council

Latton is a village and civil parish in Wiltshire, England, 1.5 miles (2.4 km) north of Cricklade, on the county border with Gloucestershire. The village is bypassed by the A419 road from Swindon to Cirencester. The parish includes the hamlet of Eysey, formerly a village with its own church and parish. In 2011 the parish had a population of 548.

Watercourses form several of the parish boundaries. In the northeast (also the county boundary) the boundary is the Ampney Brook; in the south, the Thames and its tributary the River Ray; in the northwest the River Churn, another tributary of the Thames.

== History ==
Latton village lies near Ermin Way, the Roman road which ran southeast–northwest from Silchester to the present-day Cirencester and Gloucester.

The Domesday Book of 1068 recorded a settlement of some 20 households at Latone, with two mills. Land at Latton and "Esi" was held by Reinbald, as recorded in a 1067 writ of William I. Latton and Eisey were granted in 1133 by Henry I to Cirencester Abbey on the abbey's foundation.

In 1896 the parish of Eisey (as it was then written) was added to Latton parish, extending it to the east and south and more than doubling its area. In 1984, after the A419 had been straightened to bypass Cricklade, land on the town's side of the road was transferred to Cricklade parish.

=== Eysey ===
The ancient parish of Eisey or Eysey lay east of Latton. In the Middle Ages there were settlements at Eisey and Water Eaton, which have both dwindled to farms.

There was a small church at Eisey from the 12th century or earlier until its closure in 1948; the church of St Mary that was demolished in 1953 was a rebuilding of 1844. There had been a dependant chapel at Water Eaton, dedicated to St Laurence, from the 12th century or earlier until the 17th. In 1819 a united parish of Latton with Eisey was created.

== Church ==
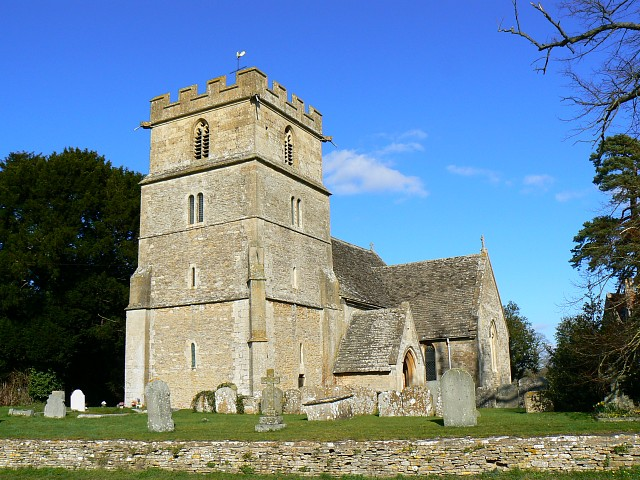
Church of St John the Baptist

The present Church of England parish church of St John dates from the 12th century. The lower part of the tower, the tower arch and chancel arch are from that century, and there is a late 12th century south door; the transepts are c. 1300. 19th-century restoration included partial rebuilding by William Butterfield in 1858–63; the nave was restored in 1992.

The tower has five bells, four of them dated 1709 and made by the elder Abraham Rudhall. The church was designated as Grade I listed in 1955.

In 1819, Latton was united with the neighbouring ecclesiastical parish of Eisey. In 1952 Latton was united with two Cricklade parishes, and outlying parts of the former Eisey parish were transferred to its neighbours. Today the parish is part of the Upper Thames benefice.

== Transport ==
The Thames and Severn Canal, opened in 1789, passed through the parish, connecting Stroud with the Thames at Lechlade until its closure in 1933. Near the village was a junction with the North Wilts Canal, a branch of the Wilts & Berks Canal which provided a connection to Swindon from 1819 until 1914.

The road which followed the route of Ermin Street was designated the A419 in 1922 and became a trunk road in 1946. In 1997, Latton village was bypassed to the west by a new section of the A419.

== Economy ==
Gravel extraction began on a small scale in the 16th century, and extensive extraction of sand and gravel from land south-west of Ermin Street was begun in the mid 1990s. Two lakes from these workings form an extension of the Cotswold Water Park. The Co-Operative Wholesale Society had a creamery near Latton from 1935, which employed some 139 people in 1956; it closed in around 1996.
