= Thames and Severn Canal =

Canal in Gloucestershire, England

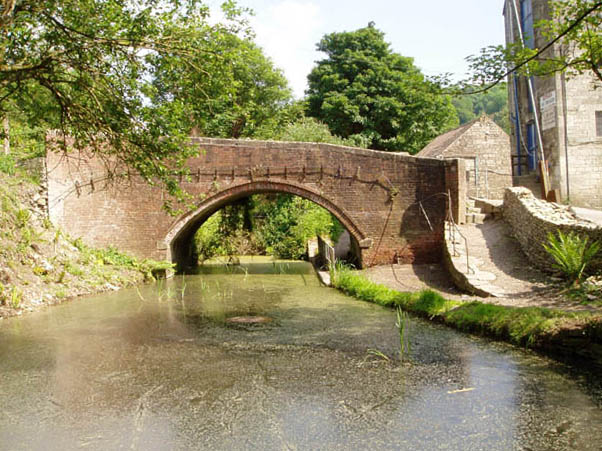
- The canal at Brimscombe

Specifications
- Length: 28.7 miles (46.2 km)
- Locks: 44
- Status: Under restoration
- Navigation authority: Stroud Valleys Canal Company

History
- Original owner: Thames and Severn Canal Company
- Principal engineer: Josiah Clowes
- Date of act: 1783
- Date completed: 1789
- Date closed: 1933
- Date restored: 2018

Geography
- Start point: Lechlade, River Thames
- End point: Wallbridge, near Stroud
- Connects to: Stroudwater Navigation, North Wilts Canal, River Thames

The Thames and Severn Canal is a canal in Gloucestershire in the south-west of England, which was completed in 1789. It was conceived as part of a cargo route from Bristol and the Midlands to London, linking England's two largest rivers for better trade. The route climbs the steep Cotswold escarpment through the Golden Valley, tunnels underneath the summit of the Cotswold Edge, and emerges near the source of the Thames.

At its eastern end, it connects to the top of the navigable Thames at Inglesham Lock near Lechlade, while at its western end, it connects to the Stroudwater Navigation at Wallbridge near Stroud, and thence to the River Severn. It had one short arm (branch), from Siddington to the town of Cirencester. It includes Sapperton Tunnel, which when built was the longest canal tunnel in Britain, and remains the second-longest complete tunnel. There were always problems with water supply, as no reservoirs were built, while the summit section near the tunnel ran through porous limestone, and there were constant difficulties with leakage. Competition from the railways took much of the canal's traffic by the end of the 19th century, and most of the canal was abandoned in 1927, the remainder in 1941.

Since 1972, the Cotswold Canals Trust has been working to restore both the canal and the Stroudwater Navigation to navigably re-link the Thames and the Severn. A number of the structures have been restored, and some sections are now in water. A major step forward occurred in 2003, when a bid was made to the Heritage Lottery Fund for £82 million to restore both canals. The bid and the project had to be split into smaller sections, but £11.9 million was awarded in 2006 for Phase 1A, which with matched funding has restored from The Ocean at Stonehouse to Wallbridge on the Stroudwater Navigation, and from there to Stroud Brewery on the Thames and Severn Canal. The Phase 1B reconnection to the national waterways network at Saul Junction is expected to be completed by 2028, connecting the Severn with the Golden Valley for the first time in a century.

In 2010, British Waterways gave Inglesham Lock to the Trust, and the Inland Waterways Association mounted a national campaign to fund its restoration (and 420 yards (380 m) of canal above). To re-open the whole canal some major engineering obstacles will need to be overcome.

== History ==
Since 1730, when the first act of Parliament to authorize a canal from the River Severn to Stroud – the Stroudwater Navigation Act 1729 (3 Geo. 2. c. 13) – had been passed, the Stroudwater Navigation had been seen as part of a larger plan to link London and Bristol by waterway. No work took place immediately, but the Stroudwater was eventually opened in 1779, and within two years the shareholders commissioned a survey for a canal from Dudbridge to Cricklade, which would complete the link. It is likely that John Priddy – previously the engineer for the Stroudwater scheme – carried out the survey, but others were soon involved including Sir Edward Littleton, who was connected with the Staffordshire and Worcestershire Canal. Priddy suggested that there were better terminal points at Wallbridge and Lechlade. Robert Whitworth then surveyed two routes, the first as suggested by Priddy, and the second direct from the Severn to the Thames following the valley of the River Coln. The first route was chosen, based on excellent water supplies at Cirencester, although the estimates of the amount of water available proved to be wildly optimistic.

Thames and Severn Canal Act 1783
- Act of Parliament
- Parliament of Great Britain
- Long title: An Act for making and maintaining a Navigable Canal from the River Thames or Isis at or near Leachlade to join and communicate with the Stroudwater Canal at Wallbridge near the Town of Stroud; and also a Collateral Cut from the said Canal at or near Siddington to or near the Town of Cirencester, in the Counties of Gloucester and Wilts.
- Citation: 23 Geo. 3. c. 38
- Territorial extent: Great Britain

Dates
- Royal assent: 17 April 1783
- Commencement: 5 December 1782 (Note: Start of session.)
Other legislation
Amended by	Thames and Severn Canal Act 1809; Thames and Severn Canal Act 1813
Relates to	Thames and Severn Canal Act 1791

Status: Amended

Text of statute as originally enacted

Thames and Severn Canal Act 1791
- Act of Parliament
- Parliament of Great Britain
- Long title: An Act to enable the Company of Proprietors of the Thames and Severn Canal Navigation to borrow a further Sum of Money, to complete the said Navigation.
- Citation: 31 Geo. 3. c. 67
- Territorial extent: Great Britain

Dates
- Royal assent: 13 May 1791
- Commencement: 10 August 1790
Other legislation
Amended by	Thames and Severn Canal Act 1809; Thames and Severn Canal Act 1813
Relates to	Thames and Severn Canal Act 1783

Status: Amended

Text of statute as originally enacted

The estimated cost of the project was £127,916, most of which was promised within three weeks. The bill to authorise the canal passed through Parliament relatively easily, and became the Thames and Severn Canal Act 1783 (23 Geo. 3. c. 38) on 17 April 1783. The company could raise an initial £130,000, with an additional £60,000 if required. The canal was to be suitable for boats 12 feet (3.7 m) wide, and so could accommodate Thames barges, but not Severn trows. Josiah Clowes was appointed head engineer, surveyor and carpenter to the canal in 1783 to assist Whitworth. Clowes became resident engineer and was paid £300 per year. His work on the canal gave him a reputation that made him highly sought after in the last five years of his life. He left the construction of the canal shortly before its completion, to work on Dudley Tunnel.

There was great debate about the gauge of the tunnel required at Sapperton. Commissioners from the River Thames thought that it would have to be built for narrow boats, since the cost of a larger tunnel would be prohibitive. It was also going to be longer than any tunnel yet built. However, a decision was made that it would be built as a broad tunnel, 15 feet (4.6 m) wide and high, and so the company advertised for tunnellers. The tunnel was expected to take four years to complete when work began at the start of 1784, but it was not completed until April 1789.

The canal opened in stages as it was completed. The first 4 miles (6.4 km) from Wallbridge to Chalford opened in January 1785, and by mid-1786, the navigable section had reached the western portal of the tunnel, 7 1/2 miles (12.1 km) and 28 locks from Wallbridge. A wharf was built at Daneway Bridge, equipped with a warehouse and coalyard.

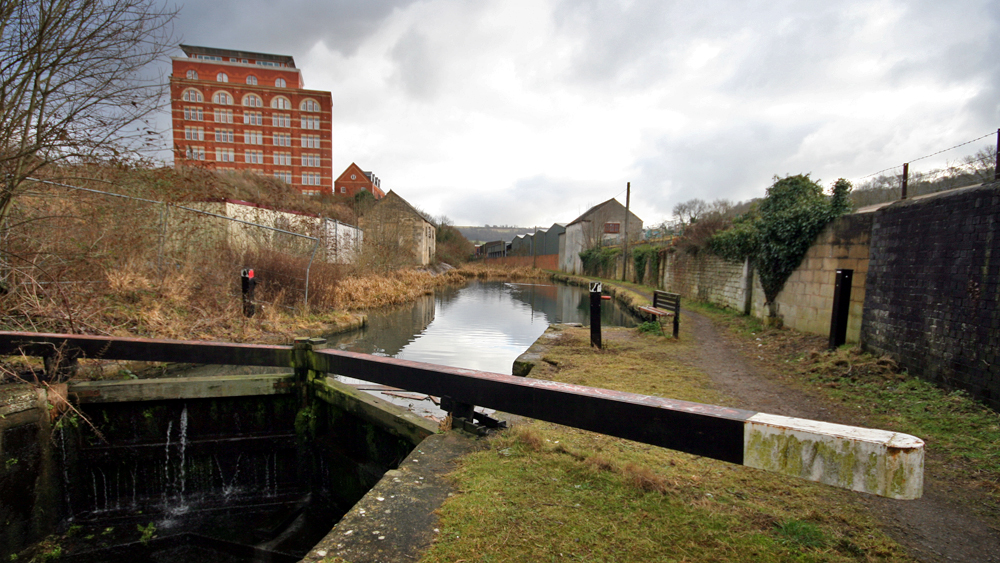
Looking east from Upper Walbridge Lock

The tunnel was constructed from many workfaces, with 25 shafts sunk along its course to provide access. After completion there were problems, and the tunnel was shut for two and a half months during 1790 for further work to be carried out. The summit level and the branch to Cirencester were completed in 1787, and became operational as soon as the tunnel opened. The final section to the junction with the Thames at Inglesham, which descends through 16 locks, was finished in November 1789. The canal was completed at a cost of £250,000. With the Stroudwater Navigation, which had been completed in 1779, it completed a link between the River Severn in the west and the River Thames in the east.

As built, the main line was just under 28.7 miles (46.2 km) long and had 44 locks. The branch to Cirencester added a further 1.5 miles (2.4 km). The first 2.5 miles (4 km) from Wallbridge to Brimscombe, where there was a transhipment basin, was built with locks 69 by 16 feet (21.0 by 4.9 m), enabling Severn trows to use it. Beyond that, the locks were 90 by 12.7 feet (27.4 by 3.9 m) and the boats used were Thames barges. The canal's summit, which is 362 feet (110 m) above sea level and 8.1 miles (13.0 km) long, includes the 3,817-yard (3,490 m) Sapperton Tunnel, at the time, the longest in England. Its length has only been exceeded by two other canal tunnels, at Standedge in the Pennines and at Strood in Kent.

=== Operation ===
Until the summit level was completed, little thought seems to have been given to water supply. It was assumed that the River Frome, to the west of the tunnel, the River Churn which flows through Cirencester, and the River Coln, together with springs at Boxwell and a well near the source of the River Thames at Thames Head, would be sufficient. The original horse pump at Thames Head was replaced by a windmill, but Clowes found that he could not stop the summit pound from leaking. The flow on the River Churn was 1.7 million imperial gallons per day (7.7 Ml/d), whereas the calculated flow at the start of the project had been more than ten times this value. The summit level was losing around 1.1 million imperial gallons per day (5.0 Ml/d), largely because the underlying rock was porous limestone, and it was estimated that around half of the daily requirement could actually be supplied. The wells at Thames Head were extended and a Boulton & Watt steam engine was installed in 1792 to pump the water into the canal. An extra, shallow lock was built at Boxwell, which allowed the level of the canal to be dropped beyond it, and more water to be taken from Boxwell springs. The new arrangements were adequate, although some of the reason was the failure of traffic to develop to the levels anticipated.

Leakage was affected by springs breaking through the clay lining of the canal bed. In summer, when the springs receded, water was lost through these holes at a rate greater than the available supply. In one of the attempts to conserve water, the length of the locks was reduced by 20 feet (6.1 m), giving them an unusual double-headed appearance. In a further attempt to prevent water loss, at King's Reach, the section immediately east of Sapperton Tunnel, the canal was lined with concrete rather than puddle clay. The concrete invert was 18 inches (46 cm) thick, and A. Brome Wilson, the canal's engineer, used pipes to feed water from the underlying springs into the canal, but at a level above the waterline.

Neither of the river navigations to which the canal connected were satisfactory. In the west, the situation was remedied in 1827, on completion of the Gloucester and Sharpness Canal. On the Thames, there had been a proposal for a canal from Lechlade to Abingdon in 1784, and for a cut from Inglesham to Buscot in 1788, but neither had been built. Some improvements were made to the river after 1786, but the canal company encouraged the building of bypasses. The Wilts & Berks Canal was one Thames bypass, providing a link to the river at Abingdon, but did not initially connect to the Thames & Severn Canal. Although it was proposed in 1793, it was not opened until 1810, and the North Wilts Canal, which eventually provided the connecting link from Latton to Swindon for Thames & Severn traffic to bypass the upper river, was not completed until 1819. Even after this, vessels were restricted by the narrow 7ft width of the North Wilts, which was considerably smaller than the rest of the link between the Thames and the Severn, limiting income from cargo.

Ultimately, most of the Bristol to London trade used the Kennet and Avon Canal after it opened in 1810, as it provided a much shorter route than the Thames and Severn Canal. Similarly, the Midlands-London traffic that the proprietors had hoped to attract via the Severn found newer routes further east, such as the Grand Junction Canal, considerably more direct. Thus, the compromise alignment of the Thames & Severn found itself bypassed, with income mainly generated by carriage of Forest of Dean coal to places along the canal rather than the balanced trade of long-distance traffic between Thames and Severn that had been anticipated. Pleasure cruising, meanwhile, was firmly discouraged, with the proprietors setting a punitive toll of £1 per lock for such boats (equivalent to over £120 today).

=== Decline ===
Railway competition began in 1836, when the Cheltenham and Great Western Railway proposed a line between Swindon and Cheltenham, via Gloucester. The canal company opposed the scheme, and received compensation of £7,500 from the railway company over the next four and a half years. The line opened to Kemble in 1841, and the tolls on the carriage of materials for the railway's construction improved the financial position of the canal for a short time. The railway company was then taken over by the Great Western Railway, who built a new tunnel at Sapperton, and opened the railway to Gloucester in 1845. Canal tolls were cut in an attempt to retain traffic, but toll revenue fell from £11,000 to £2,874 between 1841 and 1855. The Thames Commissioners were also in financial difficulties, and the Thames was almost unnavigable from Oxford to Lechlade after 1855. In 1866, plans to convert the canal to a railway were rejected by Parliament, but the Thames Commissioners were replaced by the Thames Conservancy, and most of the river was soon returned to a navigable state.

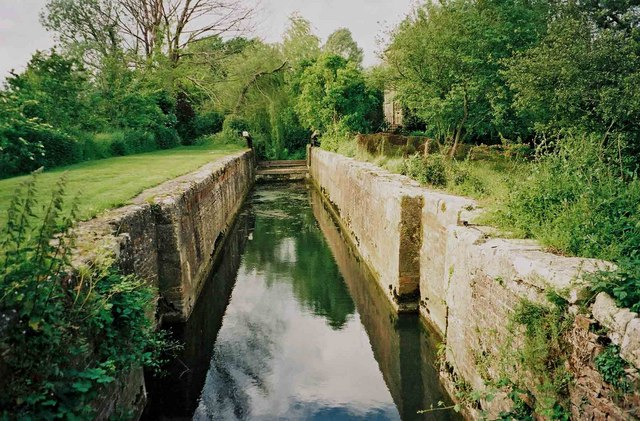
Cerney Wick Lock, Thames and Severn Canal

Thames and Severn Canal Trust Act 1895 (Note: Section 1.)
- Act of Parliament
- Parliament of the United Kingdom
- Long title: An Act for vesting in a Public Trust to be incorporated for that purpose the Undertaking of the Company of Proprietors of the Thames and Severn Canal Navigation and for other purposes.
- Citation: 58 & 59 Vict. c. cxlix
- Territorial extent: United Kingdom

Dates
- Royal assent: 6 July 1895
- Commencement: 6 July 1895 (Note: The Acts of Parliament (Commencement) Act 1793.)

Status: Current legislation

Text of statute as originally enacted

The condition of the canal continued to decline. Complaints were made about its state in 1874 and 1885, which resulted in surveys being undertaken, but little was done to remedy the situation. In 1893, the Thames and Severn Canal Company announced that the canal between Chalford and Inglesham would close two days later. Negotiations with a number of interested parties took place, and having given an assurance to the Great Western Railway that it would not be converted into a railway, an act of Parliament was obtained in 1895, the Thames and Severn Canal Trust Act 1895 (58 & 59 Vict. c. cxlix), which formed a trust with powers to raise £15,000. The trust included representatives from the Sharpness New Docks and Gloucester and Birmingham Navigation Company, the Stroudwater Canal, the Staffordshire and Worcestershire Canal, the Severn Commissioners; Berkshire, Gloucestershire and Wiltshire county councils; and Stroud and Cirencester district councils. At the same time as the trust refurbished the canal, the upper Thames was upgraded by the Thames Conservancy.

Thames and Severn Canal Order Confirmation Act 1901
- Act of Parliament
- Parliament of the United Kingdom
- Long title: An Act to confirm an Order made by the Board of Trade under the Railway and Canal Traffic Act 1888 for the transfer of the Thames and Severn Canal to the County Council of Gloucestershire and for other purposes.
- Citation: 1 Edw. 7. c. iii
- Territorial extent: United Kingdom

Dates
- Royal assent: 2 July 1901
- Commencement: 2 July 1901

Status: Current legislation

Text of statute as originally enacted

Although the canal was re-opened in March 1899, lack of water on the summit level soon closed it again, after which Gloucestershire County Council suggested that they take it over, which was the first instance of a public body taking over a waterway in the public interest. They did so on 2 July 1901, by the Thames and Severn Canal Order Confirmation Act 1901 (1 Edw. 7. c. iii). In 1925 they began negotiations with interested parties which ultimately led to the abandonment of the canal from Chalford to Inglesham in 1927. The Stroudwater Navigation managed to keep the remaining section open until 1933, when it was abandoned, and their own canal closed in 1941.

== Restoration ==
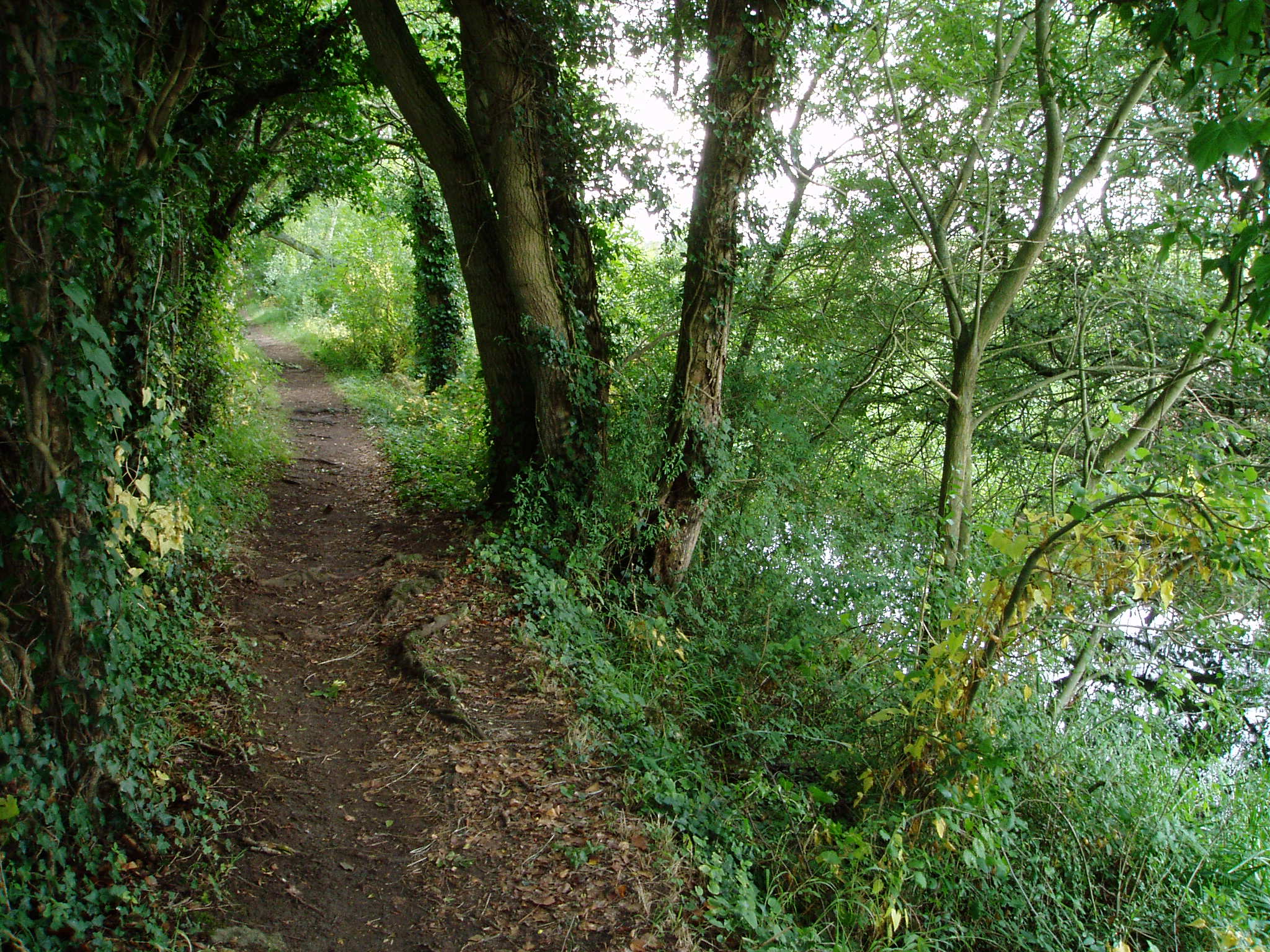
The canal towpath at South Cerney near Cirencester. Large trees have grown up in the 70 years since the canal was abandoned.

Following the publication of Ronald Russell's influential book Lost Canals of England and Wales in 1972, a number of canal restoration schemes sprang up. Among the organisations established that year was the Stroudwater Canal Society, which soon became the Stroudwater, Thames and Severn Canal Trust, and from 1975, the Cotswold Canals Trust. Volunteers for the trust have since been working to restore both the Stroudwater Navigation and the Thames and Severn Canal. Extensive lobbying in 1979 resulted in Gloucestershire County Council deciding to rebuild a damaged bridge at Daneway, rather than replace it with a much cheaper low-level causeway, which would have severed the route. Two years later, County Council support was required when the project benefited from 20 workers and a £17,000 budget for materials under the Job Creation Scheme set up by the Manpower Services Commission, as the council had to manage the scheme.

In 1991, the trust commissioned the engineering consultancy Sir William Halcrow and Partners to conduct a feasibility study for restoration of the eastern end of the canal. Funding was provided by the National Rivers Authority, local authorities, and other interested parties. The report demonstrated that there was a good case for the provision of a navigable culvert beneath the proposed Latton Bypass. Despite initially saying that a culvert would not be built, negotiation continued, and – helped by grants of £250,000 from Gloucestershire County Council and £125,000 from North Wilts District Council – the Department of the Environment decided in 1997 that a culvert would be provided under the road. The completed underpass now lies buried, awaiting the arrival of restoration work on either side.

=== Funding ===
In order to provide a suitable structure to drive the restoration forwards, the Cotswold Canals Partnership was established in 2001, drawing together people representing the Proprietors of the Stroudwater Navigation, the Cotswold Canals Trust, councils at district and county level, and a number of other interested parties. In 2002, the waterway was identified as being of high priority in the Association of Inland Navigation Authorities report entitled Vision for Strategic Enhancement of Britain's Inland Navigation Network, and was one of several new projects highlighted at British Waterways' Unlocked and Unlimited conference held in March. The estimated cost of the project was £82 million. Having raised £100,000, the Cotswold Canals Trust lodged the money with the Waterways Trust, in the hope that it could be used as match funding for any grants that might be received. Andy Stumpf became the full-time Regeneration Programme Manager, working on a major bid application to the Heritage Lottery Fund (HLF) to finance the restoration, and the canal was visited by Charles, Prince of Wales, in his capacity as patron of the Waterways Trust. A Heritage Survey, which cost £60,000 and was funded by the Inland Waterways Association, was carried out, as was a Community Development Plan and a Visitor Management Strategy, costing another £30,000, all of which were pre-requisites for the main HLF bid.

By the time the bid was ready for submission, the HLF were under pressure for the funds they had, and asked British Waterways, who were managing the application, to split the bid and the project into smaller phases. At the end of 2003, a provisional grant of £11.3 million was awarded by the HLF, to enable the restoration of the Stroudwater Navigation between Stonehouse and Wallbridge, and the Thames and Severn Canal between Wallbridge and Brimscombe Port. An additional £2.9 million was received from the European Inter-Regional budget for this first phase. By the time the grant was awarded in January 2006, it had risen to £11.9 million, and a further £6 million of match funding was received from the South West of England Regional Development Agency. Alongside these major developments, the Cotswold Canals Trust has rebuilt a number of locks and bridges and some small sections of the rest of the route are now in water.

With the restoration underway, British Waterways pulled out of the partnership in 2008 because of financial difficulties. The role of project leader was taken over by Stroud District Council, and a new body, the Stroud Valleys Canal Company, was created in March 2009 to act as a holding company for the assets of the waterway, with a responsibility to manage and maintain it once it is reopened. They now own most of the canal bed between Wallbridge and Brimscombe. The cost of the restoration exceeded estimates, and as a result, the Heritage Lottery Fund agreed to supply an additional £800,000 in December 2012, to allow full restoration between Stonehouse and Bowbridge, and the upgrading of the towpath onwards to Brimscombe Port. Work on the canal beyond Bowbridge would be handled by volunteers.

=== Progress ===
The restoration programme is divided into several phases. Phase 1a covers 6 miles (10 km) of the most difficult section to restore, centred on Stroud, comprising the lengths of the Stroudwater Navigation between Stonehouse and Wallbridge, and the Thames and Severn Canal between Wallbridge and Brimscombe Port. Phase 1b connects the completed Phase 1a section, westwards, to the rest of the inland waterways network, at Saul Junction on the Gloucester and Sharpness Canal. Phase 2 covers work at the eastern end of the canal, between Gateway Bridge in the Cotswold Water Park (Cerney Wick), and Inglesham Lock, the junction with the Thames. It will form a link between the upper Thames, the North Wilts Canal and the Wilts & Berks Canal. Phase 3 completes the project, connecting Brimscombe Port in the west with Gateway Bridge in the east, via Sapperton Tunnel.

==== Phase 1a ====
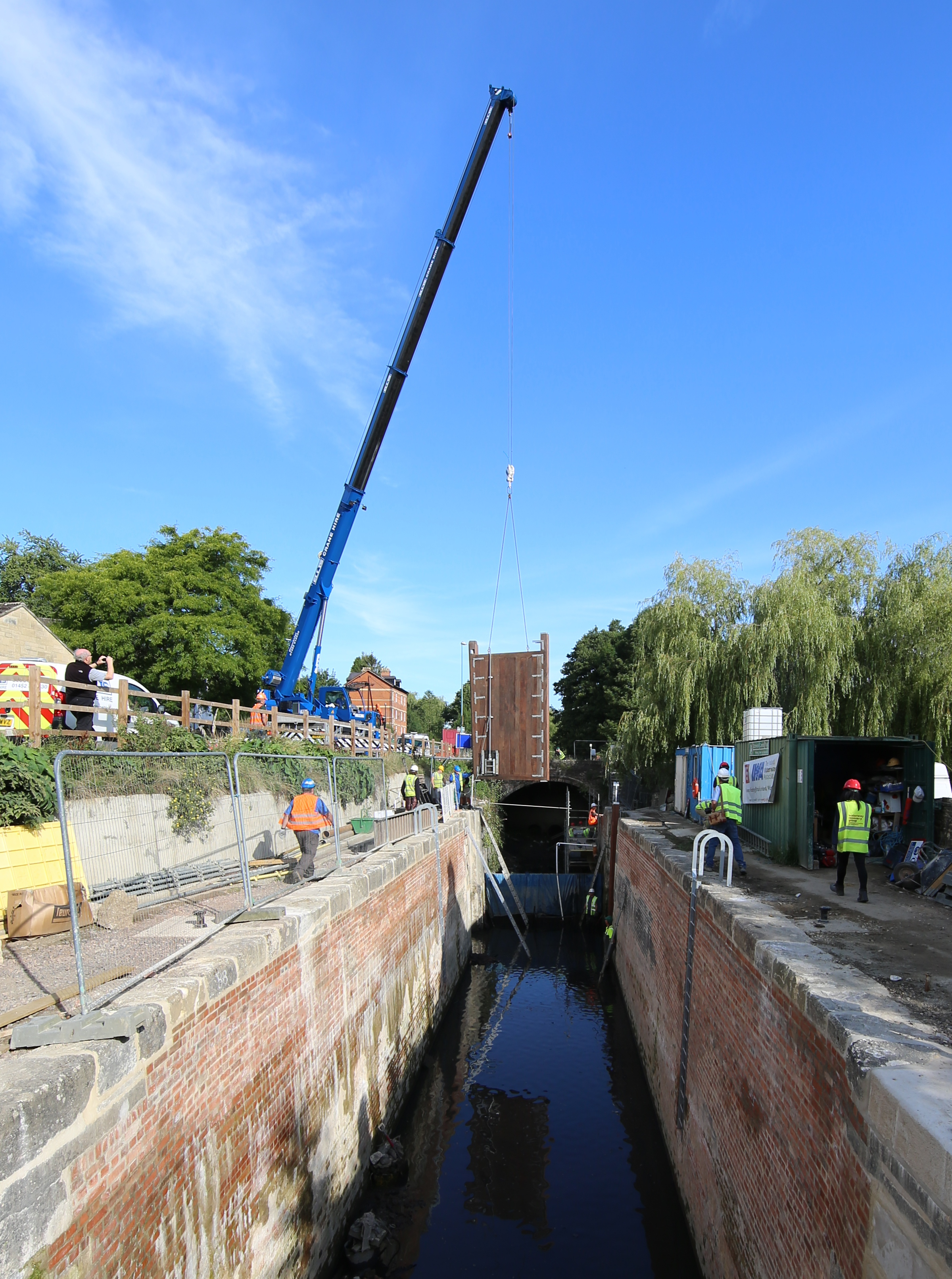
Gates being fitted to Bowbridge Lock as part of phase 1a

Phase 1a of the restoration programme covered the length of canal from The Ocean at Stonehouse, on the Stroudwater Navigation, to Brimscombe Port, east of Stroud, on the Thames and Severn Canal – a length of about 6 miles (10 km). The work included restoration of 10 locks, reconstruction of 10 bridges, and reinstatement of about 2,300 yards (2,100 m) of in-filled canal; plus the major reconstruction of Brimscombe Port. Funding was in place for all of the scheduled work, but increasing costs curtailed the programme. A revised plan – with increased support from volunteer labour – aimed to have restoration completed to Bowbridge by the end of 2015, with all major work eastwards put on hold. Phase 1a also included the provision of a multi-user trail between Stonehouse and Saul, but this was held over to Phase 1b.

The final section of the canal before it joins the Stroudwater Navigation presented particular problems for restoration, as the channel had been used as part of a flood relief scheme by the Environment Agency. Water from Slad Brook, which is culverted beneath Stroud, joins the canal a short distance above Lower Wallbridge Lock. Painswick Stream and Ruscombe Brook join the channel below the junction and flow through the Dudbridge locks, after which the water is discharged into the River Frome below the A419 Dudbridge Road bridge. As a consequence of its flood relief function, the channel here is classified as a "main river". Designs for reinstatement of the canal had to accommodate large flows on this section, and include underground bywash culverts, capable of carrying the full flood flow of the streams.

At Capels Mill, the bed of the canal was used as the route for the Stroud Bypass in the 1980s, and so a diversion had to be built at this point. It passes through an area that was used as a landfill site in the 1960s and 1970s. Some 355 yards (325 m) of new channel was constructed, some of it edged with sheet piling. After passing through a railway viaduct, the bank is supported by a series of contiguous concrete piles, which were drilled to a depth of between 30 feet (9 m) and 49 feet (15 m) and provide a retaining wall which is 35 feet (11 m) tall at its highest point. As the project neared completion, open days to allow the public to walk along the bottom of the new canal section were held on 10 and 11 May 2013, and were attended by over 1,800 people. Where domestic rubbish had to be removed, it was relocated on the site, covered with 2 feet (60 cm) of crushed recycled concrete and a layer of Bentomat geotextile, which was topped by subsoil and topsoil obtained from elsewhere on the site. Tubular vents allow any methane produced by the disturbed rubbish to escape safely. The new section was filled with water and officially completed on 2 June 2013.

An evaluation cruise was held on 10 November 2017, when the maintenance boat Wookey Hole carried three assessors from the Heritage Lottery Fund, the chief executive from Stroud District Council and their canal project manager, the Mayor of Stroud, and the Cotswold Canal Trust chief executive and vice-chair. It travelled from The Ocean at Stonebridge eastwards to Bowbridge Lock, with a stop for lunch at Upper Wallbridge Lock. The cruise enabled the HLF assessors to view the work done and to sign off the Phase 1a project, bringing it to a conclusion. An official opening of Wallbridge Lower Lock took place on 2 February 2018, when Prince Charles cut a ribbon to celebrate the reconnection of the Thames and Severn Canal with the Stroudwater Navigation, and unveiled a commemorative plaque.

During the execution of the phase 1a project, it became obvious that there would be a shortfall in funding, caused in part by the development of Brimscombe Port being deferred. Thus the Heritage Lottery funded works ended at Bowbridge Lock, and work up to Hope Mill Lock has been undertaken largely by volunteers. Some work to prepare the Brimscombe Port site for development was funded by a £2 million grant from the Homes & Communities Agency given in October 2015. Volunteers completed restoration of Griffin's Mill Lock in 2017, but dredging of the intervening channel took rather longer, and the lock was opened on 9 July 2018. Work had already begun on the restoration of Ham Mill Lock, the next one upstream. In a separate development, water supply to the restored section was improved by building a feeder siphon at Gough's Orchard Lock, which takes water from a millpond supplied by the River Frome and feeds it into the lock. The pipeline runs over the top of the canal bank, and a solar-powered pump creates a vacuum within the pipe to allow the siphoning to begin. The volume of water taken is regulated by a gate valve, and is governed by an abstraction licence issued by the Environment Agency.

==== Phase 1b ====
The second phase of the restoration programme covers the length of the Stroudwater Navigation between the Ocean railway bridge, Stonehouse, and Saul Junction on the Gloucester and Sharpness Canal, a distance of about 4 miles (6.4 km). The simpler work includes construction of two new locks, restoration of a further six locks, construction of several minor road bridges, and reinstatement of about 1 mile (1.6 km) of in-filled canal. This section poses some significant engineering problems. A new railway bridge was required at Stonehouse, where the canal had been culverted underneath the Bristol–Birmingham line. Since the canal was abandoned, the River Frome and the Oldbury Brook have both been diverted to use part of the canal bed. Most significantly, the original route had been divided by both the construction of the M5 motorway and development of the A38 trunk road. Plans to overcome these obstacles were produced, in anticipation of the necessary funding becoming available.

Bids for Heritage Lottery funding were rejected in May 2012 and November 2015. A revised bid was submitted in November 2017, and following criticism of the lack of investment by partners in the project, was backed by a promise of £3 million from Stroud District Council, £700,000 from Gloucestershire County Council and £675,000 from the Canal & River Trust, who also pledged practical support. In addition, the Cotswold Canals Trust offered financial assistance and volunteer labour. A development grant of £0.8 million was received from the Heritage Lottery Fund in April 2018, which led to the award of £8.9 million in October 2020. A further boost was the granting of £4 million from Highways England in May 2019, to cover the cost of tunnelling under the A38 roundabout and other environmental projects along the "missing mile", the new route of the canal to replace the section obliterated by road construction and infilling. Phase 1b, which became known as Cotswold Canals Connected in 2018, is expected to be completed by 2028.

Stroud District Council decided that the infrastructure costs for the development of Brimscombe Port were too high to entice developers to the scheme, and made a bid to Homes England in 2015 for public funding. They received £2 million from this source, to which they added another £2 million as match funding. They also received £776,000 from the One Public Estate Land Release Fund, which is given for the development of brownfield sites. Planning permission was obtained in March 2021 for the development of the port, including reinstatement of the canal, basin and various bridge works. The initial work includes demolition of modern additions to Port Mill so that a new canal channel and riverbed can be constructed further to the south than formerly, with the new river channel replacing the previous culvert under the modern parts of Port Mill. In July 2022, the council selected St. Modwen Homes as the developer to work on the project. St Modwen pulled out of their contract in 2025, but Stroud District Council responded by saying they were still hopeful that the port could be reinstated.

With the completion of the Cotswold Canals Connected project on the horizon, the Cotswold Canals Trust began looking at how the Thames and Severn canal could be restored. One option is to restore it as a narrow canal, suitable for boats which are 7 feet (2.1 m) wide, rather than the original width of 13 feet (4.0 m). This would reduce the costs of replacing some 30 bridges, would reduce water consumption and the costs of back-pumping water, and would make restoration of the collapsed Sapperton Tunnel considerably easier.

==== Phase 2 ====
Restoration programme phase 2 covers work at the eastern end of the canal, between Gateway Bridge in the Cotswold Water Park (Cerney Wick), and the junction with the Thames at Inglesham Lock, a distance of about 10 miles (16 km). The section does not pose the major engineering challenges faced elsewhere, but land ownership is an issue, and there are several miles of in-filled canal around Kempsford. Funding is only in place for minor projects, but several locks have been substantially restored, lengths of towpath reconstructed, and dredging completed.

In 2002, British Waterways bought the lock at Inglesham and the adjacent round house, to safeguard the route of the canal. After they pulled out of the restoration scheme, they sold the house, which was bought by a member of the Cotswold Canals Trust, and transferred the ownership of the lock to the trust. In June 2010 the Inland Waterways Association (IWA) mounted a national campaign for £125,000 to enable Inglesham Lock and around 420 yards (380 m) of the pound above it to be restored. Work on the refurbishment of the lock structure began in 2016 and was completed in May 2019, with some tidying up of the site continuing until September.

==== Phase 3 ====
The completion of the project is outlined in phase 3, to connect Brimscombe Port in the west with Gateway Bridge in the east, a distance of about 16 miles (26 km). Restoring this central section poses several major engineering difficulties: firstly to overcome the always inadequate water supply, and secondly because the 2.2-mile-long (3.5 km) Sapperton Tunnel is blocked by two rock falls. In addition, there are two missing railway bridges, an aqueduct, and 31 locks to rebuild. As of May 2015, there was no significant funding in place for any restoration projects on this section of the canal.

Parts of the tunnel are in good condition, where it has been cut through stable rock – Great Oolite limestone at the Coates end, or Inferior Oolite towards the Daneway end. However, a length of 0.63 miles (1.01 km) near the middle of the tunnel and 0.28 miles (0.45 km) at the Daneway end are cut through fuller's earth, and although lined with brick, the fuller's earth expands when wet, and this has resulted in heave of the bottom of the tunnel, causing wall and roof falls.

== Structures ==
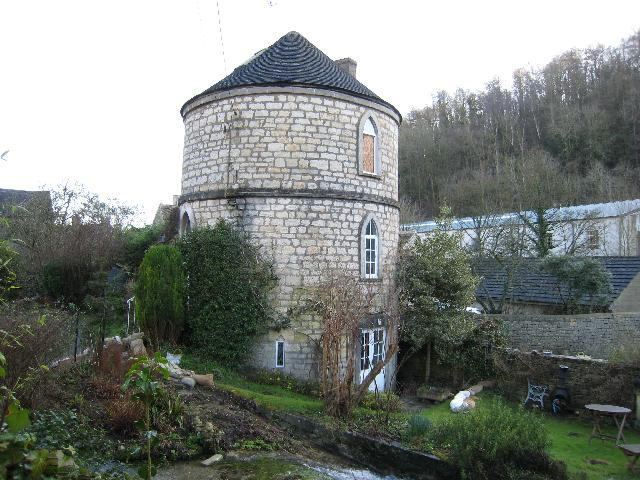
Chalford Roundhouse at the site of Chalford Wharf

A number of the buildings associated with the canal have survived and appear on the listed building register, including five circular cottages, built with three floors. The lower floor was intended to be used as a store and has access to the outside. A set of outside steps leads up to the first floor, which is around 16 feet 10 inches (5.13 m) in diameter. It was designed as a living area and was equipped with a cooking range. A staircase, built between the inner and outer wall, leads up to a circular bedroom on the second floor. The round houses are situated at Lechlade (the Round House, Inglesham), by the entrance lock from the Thames; at Marston Meysey; at Cerney Wick near Latton, next to lock 39; at Coates, close to the eastern portal of the tunnel; and at Chalford, next to lock 13. Some had a pointed slate roof, while others had a lead cone, which collected rainwater for drinking. They were built in the 1790s for use by lock-keepers and lengthsmen, but were not particularly popular due to the limited amount of space and problems with finding suitable furniture for a circular room.

== Literary connections ==
In 1953, C. S. Forester published Hornblower and the Atropos, a historical novel set during the Napoleonic Wars, in which Horatio Hornblower, a captain in the Royal Navy, travels along the canal to London. He assists with legging the boat through the Sapperton tunnel and then steering it after the postillion in charge of the horses is injured.

== Points of interest ==
Point	Coordinates (Links to map resources)	OS Grid Ref	Notes
Wallbridge lower lock	51.7444°N 2.2241°W	SO846050	Junction with Stroudwater Navigation
A419 on canal bed	51.7418°N 2.2146°W	SO852048	Diversion constructed
Bowbridge Lock	51.7367°N 2.2075°W	SO857042	
Ham Mill Lock	51.7274°N 2.2049°W	SO859032	
Hope Mill lock	51.7214°N 2.1971°W	SO864025	
Brimscombe Port	51.7199°N 2.1936°W	SO867023	End of Phase 1
Bourne Lock	51.7180°N 2.1860°W	SO872021	
St Marys Lock	51.7185°N 2.1670°W	SO885022	
Chalford Wharf	51.7210°N 2.1587°W	SO891024	
Chalford Lock	51.7210°N 2.1410°W	SO903024	
Puck Mill Upper Lock	51.7251°N 2.1158°W	SO920029	
Daneway locks, Wharf cottage	51.7290°N 2.0907°W	SO938033	crossed River Frome
Sapperton Tunnel west portal	51.7286°N 2.0826°W	SO943033	
Sapperton Tunnel - miners' access shaft	51.723°N 2.075°W	SO949027	
Sapperton Tunnel - miners' access shaft	51.7175°N 2.068°W	SO953020	
Sapperton Tunnel - east portal	51.7041°N 2.0504°W	SO966005	
Tarlton, Lengthman's Roundhouse	51.6997°N 2.0448°W	SO970001	disused
Trewsbury House	51.699°N 2.032°W	SO978000	Coates, Gloucestershire
Thames Head bridge - A433 crossing	51.6904°N 2.0215°W	ST986990	also site of Thames Head Pumping Station.
A429 crossing	51.688°N 2.004°W	ST998988	A429 covers canal-bed
Ewen wharf	51.685°N 2.00°W	SU000984	Railway bridge
Park Leaze & Furzen Leaze pound	51.6865°N 1.986°W	SU010986	
Spratsgate lane	51.6922°N 1.967°W	SU023992	lane blocks canal bed
Cirencester arm	51.696°N 1.9583°W	SU029996	
Siddington locks	51.695°N 1.955°W	SU032995	Siddington
River Churn crossing	51.688°N 1.9432°W	SU040988	disused
South Cerney locks	51.68°N 1.927°W	SU051979	South Cerney - disused section
lock	51.6776°N 1.919°W	SU056976	disused lock
lock	51.674°N 1.8985°W	SU071972	disused lock
Cerney Wick lock	51.663°N 1.888°W	SU078960	disused lock
locks	51.661°N 1.886°W	SU079958	disused lock
Latton Junction, North Wilts canal basin	51.657°N 1.876°W	SU087954	North Wilts Canal
A419 Cricklade	51.649°N 1.853°W	SU102944	A419 - disrupted section
Eysey (Eisey) lock	51.654°N 1.827°W	SU120950	disused
Marston Meysey - Roundhouse farm	51.665°N 1.813°W	SU130962	Marston Meysey disused section
Kempsford	51.669°N 1.773°W	SU157967	Kempsford disused section
Dudgrove double lock	51.679°N 1.72°W	SU194978	disused section
Inglesham Lock & Roundhouse	51.6877°N 1.7054°W	SU204988	junction with River Thames

== See also ==
- Canals of Great Britain
- History of the British canal system
- List of canal tunnels in the United Kingdom
- The Golden Valley line which runs alongside the canal between Stroud and Kemble.

== Bibliography ==
- Cumberlidge, Jane (2009). Inland Waterways of Great Britain (8th Ed.). Imray Laurie Norie and Wilson. ISBN 978-1-84623-010-3.
- Denny, Andrew (January 2021). "The lottery-winning waterway". Waterways World. ISSN 0309-1422.
- Forester, C. S. (2006). Hornblower and the Atropos. Penguin. ISBN 978-0-14-102504-9.
- Hadfield, Charles (1969). The Canals of South and South East England. David and Charles. ISBN 978-0-7153-4693-8.
- Household, Humphrey (2009). The Thames and Severn Canal. Amberley Publishing. ISBN 978-1-84868-035-7.
- Jackson, W Turrentine; Chaloner, W H (1962). The Development of Transport in Modern England. Routledge. ISBN 978-0-7146-1326-0.
- McKnight, Hugh (1981). The Shell Book of Inland Waterways. David & Charles. ISBN 978-0-7153-8239-4.
- Skempton, A. W.; et al. (2002). A Biographical Dictionary of Civil Engineers in Great Britain and Ireland. Thomas Telford. ISBN 978-0-7277-2939-2.
- Squires, Roger (2008). Britain's restored canals. Landmark Publishing. ISBN 978-1-84306-331-5.
