= Sapperton Valley =

Nature reserve in Gloucestershire, England

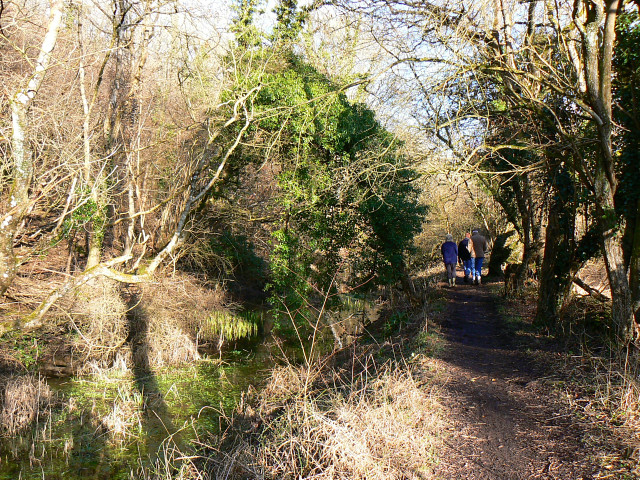
- Walkers in the reserve by the old canal

- Location within Gloucestershire
- Type: Gloucestershire Wildlife Trust nature reserve
- Location: Frome Valley near Sapperton and east of Chalford
- Coordinates: 51°43′50.26″N 2°5′41.25″W
- Area: 9.2 acres (3.7 ha)
- Created: 1964
- Operator: Gloucestershire Wildlife Trust Bathurst Estate
- Status: Open all year

Sapperton Valley (grid reference SO935035) is a 3.7-hectare (9.1-acre) nature reserve near Chalford in the Stroud district of Gloucestershire, England. The site is managed by the Gloucestershire Wildlife Trust under leasing arrangements with the Bathurst Estate, in place since 1964.

== Location and habitat ==
The reserve is close to Sapperton and Frampton Mansell, and about two miles east of Chalford. It lies south of two other nature reserves: Siccaridge Wood and Daneway Banks, the latter a Site of Special Scientific Interest. The Sapperton Valley reserve is a long ribbon of canal bank, water meadows and woodland by the disused former Thames and Severn Canal. The River Frome runs parallel to the old canal and is the boundary to the reserve on its south side. The reserve is about a mile long.

The canal was built originally to link the Stroud mills which supported the woollen trade, and was opened in the late 18th century. The length from Whitehall Bridge to Lechlade closed in the early 20th century. A road bridge is the western end of the nature reserve; access to the reserve is along the towpath. There is some space for vehicles south of Daneway Bridge. The canal construction included a long tunnel, deep locks, bridges, a loading basin and the Daneway Inn, built to accommodate the men working on the tunnel.

The Sapperton Valley is considered to be an important wetland area, situated as it is between the Frome and the canal. There are a series of wet meadows and this area is damp, generally undisturbed and overgrown, supporting wildlife. A diversity of habitats are thus concentrated in a relatively small area and range from ancient woodland to wetland. The 2005 Stroud District Local Plan identified the valley as a Key Wildlife Site.

== Woodland and plant life ==
The trees along the canal include pedunculate oak, ash, crack willow and field maple. The area is colonised with common reed, reed sweet-grass and the more open areas support marsh-marigold, yellow water-lily, water dock and gipsywort. Meadowsweet and great willowherb flourish. There is also common valerian, purple-loosestrife, common marsh-bedstraw, yellow iris, ragged robin and marsh woundwort. Woodland flowers such as primrose, bluebell, yellow archangel and bugle thrive in a small wood near the tunnel entrance and under the towpath hedgerows. This wetland area supports a variety of fungi, liverworts and mosses.

== Bird life ==
This is a reserve rich in bird life and recorded are moorhen, mallard, nuthatch, grey wagtail, marsh tit and blackcap. Mallard, moorhen and grey wagtail breed in the reserve. Herons and kingfishers are seen in the area.

== Other species ==
There are good populations recorded of the common frog and common toad. Bats feed and roost in the area. Fallow deer are visitors to the reserve as is the fox. Molluscs found include the uncommon land winkle and Rolph's door snail. Dragonflies forage in the area and the reserve supports good populations of butterflies and moths.

== Conservation ==
The meadow areas are cut at the end of the summer to control the more dominant species. This practice supports the increase in the range of flowers.

== Walks ==
There is a publication which details walks for recreation and observing wildlife in the Golden Valley. This includes information on Sapperton Valley and four other nearby nature reserves being Strawberry Banks SSSI, Three Groves Wood, Daneway Banks SSSI and Siccaridge Wood. The walk also includes other ancient woodland at Peyton's Grove, Oakridge village, Bakers Mill and Reservoir, Ashmeads Spring, and part of the route of the old Thames and Severn Canal.

== Publications ==
- Kelham, A, Sanderson, J, Doe, J, Edgeley-Smith, M, et al., 1979, 1990, 2002 editions, 'Nature Reserves of the Gloucestershire Trust for Nature Conservation/Gloucestershire Wildlife Trust'
- Siccaridge Wood and Sapperton Valley Nature Reserve – Ancient Dormouse woodland and luxuriant valley wetland', (undated), Gloucestershire Wildlife Trust
- 'The Golden Valley Walk', (undated), Gloucestershire Wildlife Trust
- ‘Nature Reserve Guide – discover the wild Gloucestershire on your doorstep’ – 50th Anniversary, January 2011, Gloucestershire Wildlife Trust
