= Sapperton =

Sapperton may refer to:

- Sapperton, Derbyshire, England
- Sapperton, Gloucestershire, England
  - Sapperton Tunnel (two railway tunnels)
  - Sapperton Canal Tunnel
- Sapperton, Lincolnshire, England
- Sapperton, New Westminster, British Columbia, Canada
  - Sapperton Station, New Westminster, Canada
