= Berks and Hants Canal =

Formerly proposed canal in Berkshire and Hampshire, England

Specifications
- Length: 13 miles (21 km)
- Locks: 12 (plus inclined plane at Sherborne St John)
- Status: Rejected by Parliament

History
- Original owner: Berkshire and Hampshire Canal Company
- Principal engineer: Francis Giles
- Other engineer: John Rennie
- Date of act: 1790s (rejected); 1825 (rejected); 1826 (rejected)

Geography
- Start point: Midgham, Berkshire
- End point: Old Basing, Hampshire
- Connects to: Kennet and Avon Canal; Basingstoke Canal

The Berks and Hants Canal, incorporated as the Berkshire and Hampshire Junction Canal Company, was a proposed canal in the English counties of Berkshire and Hampshire. Proposals for the waterway came after the completion of the Kennet and Avon Canal and the Basingstoke Canal in the 1790s, with a view to connecting the two canals.

== Proposals ==
The first proposal was put forward at a meeting of the Kennet and Avon Canal Company on 7 February 1794 by Mr Best of Basingstoke, who proposed a junction on the Kennet and Avon near Hamstead Marshall, linking to the Basingstoke Canal at Old Basing.

A later suggestion for connecting the waterways was made by Ralph Dodd in the early 1800s, who suggested a link to Basingstoke from the Andover Canal near Fullerton, with a divergent canal at Whitchurch to Hamstead Marshall.

A third proposal was made by the Kennet and Avon Canal Company in the 1810s, the route for which was surveyed by John Rennie. He recommended a 21-mile (34 km) canal from Hamstead Marshall to Old Basing, via Brimpton and Tadley. A short flight of locks would have brought the canal southward out of the Kennet valley before crossing the River Enborne near Shalford Bridge. Three more locks would have taken the canal out of the Enborne valley to the south of Brimpton. For 10 miles (16 km) between Brimpton and Basingstoke the canal would have followed contours, effectively increasing the length of the summit pound on the Basingstoke Canal to 30 miles (48 km). This long pound would have had a 0.85-mile (1.37 km) tunnel traversing the north side of Browning Hill near Baughurst; the tunnel portals would have been near the Baughurst turnpike (at Axmansford) to the west and near St Peter's Church, Tadley, to the east. This proposal was opposed by the Thames authorities, and was likely met with opposition from the Basingstoke Canal company.

Rennie died in 1821. Three years later, his proposal was amended by his junior, Francis Giles, who surveyed a similar but shorter route totalling 13 miles (21 km). Rather than diverging from the Kennet and Avon to the west of Newbury, Giles's route left the Kennet and Avon Canal between Midgham Lock and Heale's Lock, running south to Brimpton before continuing with Rennie's route. The proposal would have used a shorter tunnel of 0.5 miles (0.80 km) at Tadley, and had potential for an inclined plane at Sherborne St John. Giles's proposal had aqueducts over the Enborne, the Bow Brook and the River Loddon, and required 38 bridges and approximately 12 locks. The summit of the canal would have been 100 feet (30 m) above the lowest points, and with no nearby watercourses to provide water, significant pumps would have been required to ensure sufficient water on the summit pound and through any subsequent locks. The project received financial support totalling over £70,000 (equivalent to £4,095,000 in 2015), although the proposed cost of the construction was £105,000 (equivalent to £6,142,000 in 2015) and the majority of local landowners opposed the plans. A meeting at The Hind's Head in Aldermaston was held in January 1825 to rally opposition to the canal. When the bill reached parliamentary sessions, it was rejected by in committee. Giles made an amendment the following year to provide a pumping station by the River Enborne at Ashford Hill, although this resubmitted bill was rejected in 1826.

=== 21st century ===
With the Basingstoke Canal unnavigable beyond the fallen Greywell Tunnel, the Basingstoke Canal Society are proponents of a canal linking the two waterways. However, rather than a route via Tadley, a due-north canal connecting Greywell with the Kennet and Avon between Burghfield and Southcote Locks is suggested.
