= Charles Jones (engineer) =

English civil engineer

- Citizenship: English
- Children: At least 3 sons
- Engineering career
- Discipline: Civil engineering
- Employers: Thames and Severn Canal Company, Basingstoke Canal Company
- Projects: Sapperton Tunnel, Greywell Tunnel

Charles Jones (fl. 1773 – c. 1796) was an English civil engineer, working primarily on canal tunnels. Despite Jones's extensive career working with prominent engineers (such as John Rennie, William Jessop and Josiah Clowes) on many waterways, he gained a reputation of unreliability and inability, and was dismissed from a number of projects.

== Career ==
Jones had experience in masonry and mining; he likely learned his trade in the coalfields of Shropshire or Gloucestershire.

In 1773 he was living at Preston on the Hill, from where he undertook a number of contracts on the Bridgwater Canal. He later undertook contracts on the Preston Brook tunnel on the Trent and Mersey Canal and on the Chesterfield Canal. Jones's work on the Norwood Tunnel on the Chesterfield Canal earned him £3 per yard.

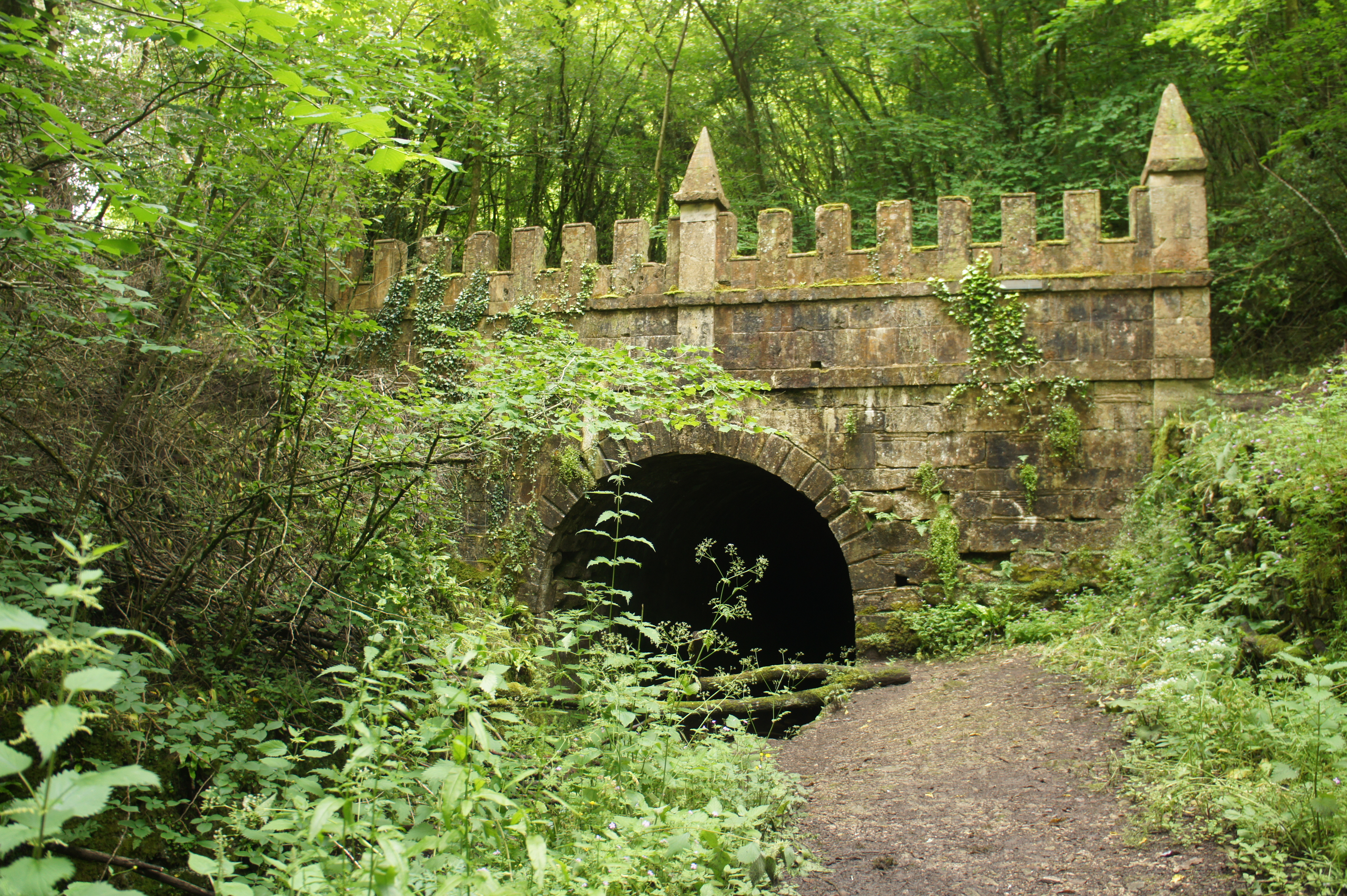
Jones worked on the Sapperton Tunnel in Gloucestershire (north portal shown)

Jones gained a reputation for failing upon debts, as well as becoming known for ineptitude and dishonesty. Despite this, in 1783 he was contracted by the Thames and Severn Canal Company to dig the Sapperton Tunnel at 7 guineas per yard, with a completion date of 1788. The tunnel was to be the longest in the country at 3,817 yards (3,490 m). Jones's engagement at Sapperton was ensured through recommendation by the canal's engineer, Josiah Clowes, who described him as "well qualified by experience to take the conduct and management [of the works]". Jones's budget allowed for him to use an early type of railway in the construction, although his financial management led him to fail to pay his workers and he spent various periods in debtors' prison at Bisley, Minchinhampton, and Gloucester. After each release, Jones resumed work on the tunnel. One spell in jail almost caused Jones to break his contract, which stated that he was not to be absent from the tunnel works for more than 28 days at a time. He was released on the 27th day, to find that the canal company had enacted a lien on his personal belongings as a means of security. In retaliation, Jones's son George made a drunken death threat to Samuel Smith, the canal company's owner; this resulted in the son being prohibited from coming within 20 miles (32 km) of the canal for five years.

In 1785, after a spell in jail, Jones wrote to a Samuel Smith stating that of his own volition he would not set foot in the inns near the tunnel's ends at Hailey Wood or Sapperton. The same year, after Jones disappeared on a three-day drinking binge, the canal proprietors gave him a three-month ultimatum to finish the tunnel or resign. It is probable that Jones was dismissed during the summer of 1785, after digging just 1,487 yards (1,360 m)—less than half of the total tunnel length. Jones had opened a portal at the Daneway end of the tunnel and sunk a number of access shafts. The portal suffered at least one collapse, as did the tunnel roof at Hailey Wood near its southern end. Jones did not open a southern (Coates) portal during his tenure.

Jones was back in contact with the canal company in 1788. He took them to court, claiming that he fulfilled his contract. This claim was refuted by the proprietors, and in retaliation the company described him as "neither a skilfull Artist, Attentive to his Business or Honorable, but Vain, Shifty and Artfull in all his Dealings". They outlined that they had made payments on Jones's behalf totaling £14,355, and that he was indebted to them by almost £2,000. The case against the canal company was dismissed, with costs, in 1795.

In late 1788, William Jessop gave Jones the contract to drive the Greywell Tunnel on the Basingstoke Canal. Despite referring to himself as the "Architect of Grewell [sic]", Jones's tunneling on the Basingstoke Canal was much like that on the Thames and Severn Canal—he failed to progress satisfactorily and the proprietors' visit to the works in August 1789 led to him being dismissed. John Pinkerton described the reason for his dismissal as "improper conduct". It is likely this referred to Jones's intoxication and probable alcoholism. Pinkerton later requested that the canal proprietors reinstate Jones, although this plea was refused.

Following his dismissal, Jones continued to reside at his engineer's house near the eastern end of the Greywell Tunnel works. He was resident there in September 1790, when John Rennie wrote to him regarding works on the Andover Canal.

In August 1791, Jones was engaged on the Rother Navigation near Midhurst; it appears that a number of employees from the Basingstoke Canal—including Jessop and Pinkerton—were also involved in the project.

Jones's later projects include the Braunston Tunnel on the Grand Junction Canal, described by Alec Skempton as "less than successful". Skempton identified that Jones may also have been the same "Mr Jones" who was briefly employed by Rennie to work with James Spedding on the Bruce Tunnel on the Kennet and Avon Canal.

== Family ==
Jones had three sons—Charles Jr., George, and Samuel. All three became civil engineers, with Charles and George working with him on the Sapperton Tunnel. One of the sons worked as an agent on the Norwood Tunnel on the Chesterfield Canal, with poor results. In 1804–1805 George was employed by John Rennie on the Royal Military Canal; slow progress meant that Rennie lost the contract and he blamed the poor works on his contractors. In 1814, George again worked with Rennie, this time as resident engineer on the Stoneleigh Abbey bridge project. It is possible that Rennie's willingness to re-employ George on an engineering project shows how little he prioritised the project.

In 1830, Charles Jr. had retired through ill health. By the mid-1830s it appears that the family of engineers firm had ceased to trade; one of the last Jones projects was that of the Devonport Waterworks.
