= Sapperton Tunnel =

Sapperton Tunnel may refer to:

- Sapperton Canal Tunnel, Gloucestershire, England
- Sapperton Railway Tunnel, Gloucestershire, England
