= Daneway Banks SSSI =

Biological Site of Special Scientific Interest in Gloucestershire, England

Daneway Banks
- Site of Special Scientific Interest
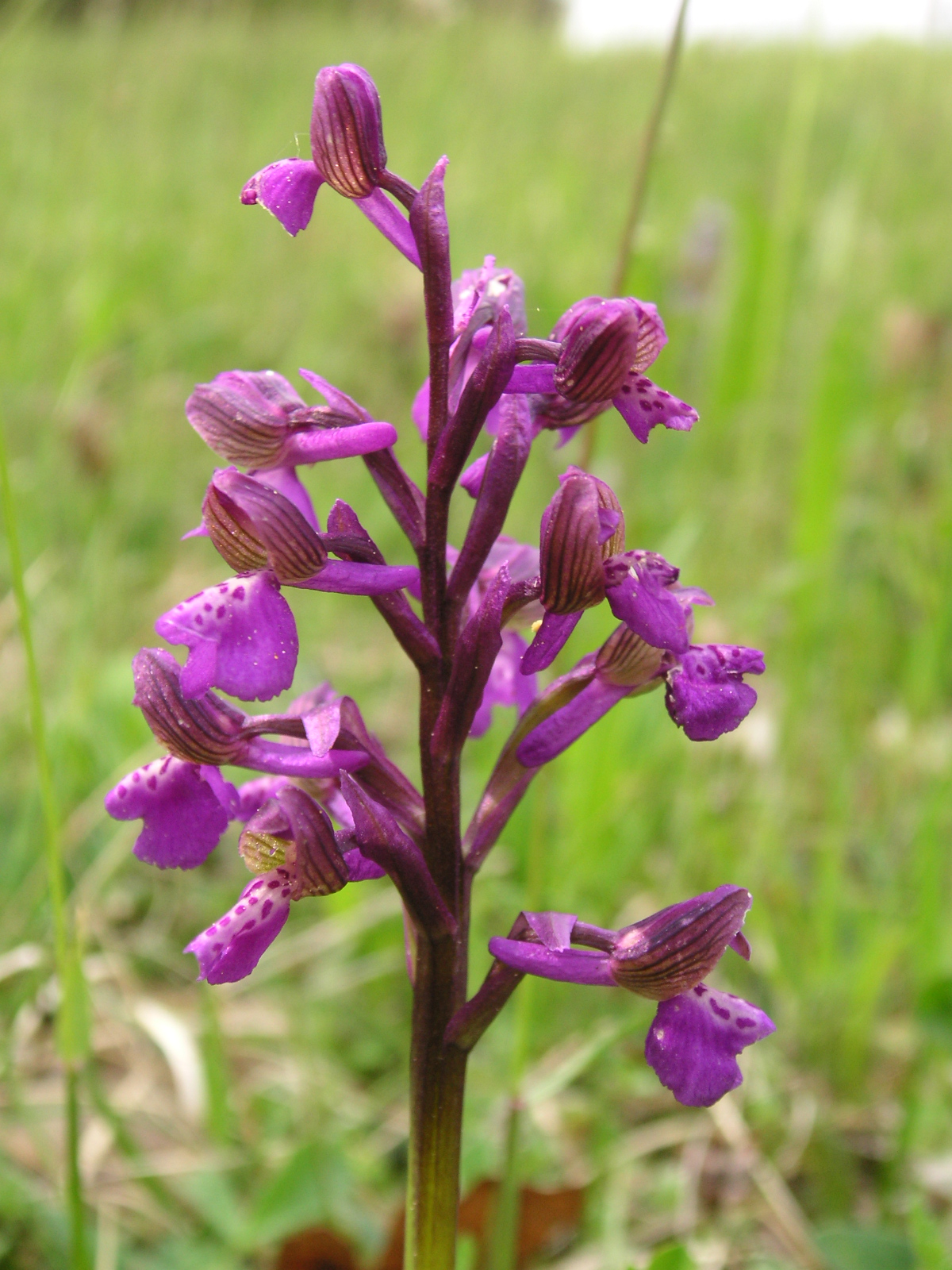
- Example – green-winged orchid (Orchis morio)
- Location of Daneway Banks.
- Area of search: Gloucestershire
- Grid reference: SO937034
- Coordinates: 51.72972°N 2.09189°W
- Interest: Biological
- Area: 17 ha (42 acres)
- Notification date: 1954

Daneway Banks (grid reference SO937034) is a 17-hectare (42-acre) biological Site of Special Scientific Interest in Gloucestershire, notified in 1954 and renotified in 1983. It lies half a mile west of Sapperton and is part of a group of wildlife sites in the Frome Valley that includes Siccaridge Wood and Sapperton Canal reserves. The site is in the Cotswold Area of Outstanding Natural Beauty.

The site is jointly owned by the Gloucestershire Wildlife Trust and the Royal Entomological Society. It is one of a group of nature reserves in Stroud's Golden Valley. The site is listed in the ‘Stroud District’ Local Plan, adopted November 2005, Appendix 6 (online for download) as a Key Wildlife Site.

== Site ==
The upper slopes are oolitic limestone grassland and is important habitat for plants. However, scrub, woodland and neutral grassland contribute to the site's diversity. The neutral Fuller's earth clay grassland at the bottom of the slope is less flower-rich, but provides good grazing. The steep scree slope was previously woodland as demonstrated by the presence of angular Solomon's-seal, deadly nightshade, bluebell and the deep blue flowers of columbine.

Numerous large ant-hills are a prominent feature of the reserve. They are made by the yellow meadow ant. In some places they may be as a high as a metre. In parts of Gloucestershire the ant hills are known as "emmet casts", "emmet" being the old English word for ant.

== Plants and grasses ==
The flora includes kidney vetch, pyramidal orchid, wild thyme, common rock-rose, clustered bellflower and a good population of green-winged orchids. Uncommon plants present are cut-leaved germander, slender bedstraw and wild liquorice.

The limestone grassland consists largely of upright brome with tor-grass on steeper parts where site is ungrazed. The vegetation is tussocky with encroaching scrub while a shorter herb-rich sward occurs in the grazed area. The neutral grassland community has more abundant false oat-grass and cock's foot.

== Trees and scrub ==
Hawthorn, blackthorn and dog-rose scrub is scattered over the reserve with some dense thickets. A small woodland is made up of beech, yew and common whitebeam. Along the southern boundary there is a strip of hazel coppice, field maple and wild cherry.

== Invertebrates and reptiles ==
There are strong colonies of small blue, marbled white, dark green fritillary and green hairstreak butterflies and numerous moths, snails, spiders and tiny false scorpions.

Between June and July the large blue butterfly may be seen. This became extinct in the UK in the 1970s, but has been reintroduced to the reserve. These beautiful and rare butterflies were reintroduced to the nature reserve in 2002, after being extinct in the county since the 1960s. The reintroduction is part of the Centre for Ecology and Hydrology’s (CEH) Large Blue Project.

The steep scree slope is a good basking area for adders and common lizards.

== Birds ==
Breeding birds include yellowhammer, tree pipit and common redstart.

== Conservation ==
Selective grazing by sheep and cattle has resulted in short and long grassy areas. The rotational grazing operates by fences breaking up the site into compartments. Scrub is hand-cleared, but song posts and thickets are left for the breeding birds. The cut-leaved germander is encouraged by the creation of its preferred open-scree habitat, and this is fenced against disturbance by rabbits. The cut-leaved germander is fully protected under the Wildlife and Countryside Act.

== Walks ==
There is a publication which details walks for recreation and observing wildlife in the Golden Valley. This includes information on Daneway Banks and four other nearby nature reserves being Three Groves Wood, Strawberry Banks SSSI, Siccaridge Wood and Sapperton Valley. The walk also includes other ancient woodland at Peyton's Grove, Oakridge village, Bakers Mill and Reservoir, Ashmeads Spring, and part of the route of the old Thames and Severn Canal.

== Publications ==
- Kelham, A, Sanderson, J, Doe, J, Edgeley-Smith, M, et al., 1979, 1990, 2002 editions, 'Nature Reserves of the Gloucestershire Trust for Nature Conservation/Gloucestershire Wildlife Trust'
- 'The Golden Valley Walk', (undated), Gloucestershire Wildlife Trust

== SSSI Source ==
- Natural England SSSI information on the citation
- Natural England SSSI information on the Daneway Banks unit
