= Bryan Mackey =

Bryan Mackey (1770–1847) was an English Anglican vicar and the first black Church of England clergyman.

Mackey was born in 1770 to William Mackey – an English Gentleman – and an unnamed woman from Jamaica. In 1780, by an act of the Jamaican Assembly, Mackey was granted exemption from inheritance restrictions normally placed on those of African or part-African descent.

He studied at Brasenose College, Oxford, where he was ordained as deacon in 1793 and was appointed curate at Wootton Rivers, Wiltshire the same year. He was ordained as a priest in 1794. Mackey became rector of Coates, Gloucestershire in 1799. He conducted a wedding in Milton Lilbourne in 1806, and his three children were baptised there, suggesting he held curateship at that parish.

He was appointed curate of Sapperton, Gloucestershire in 1813.

Mackey died aged 77 in 1847 in Southampton.
