= Siccaridge Wood =

Nature reserve in Gloucestershire, England

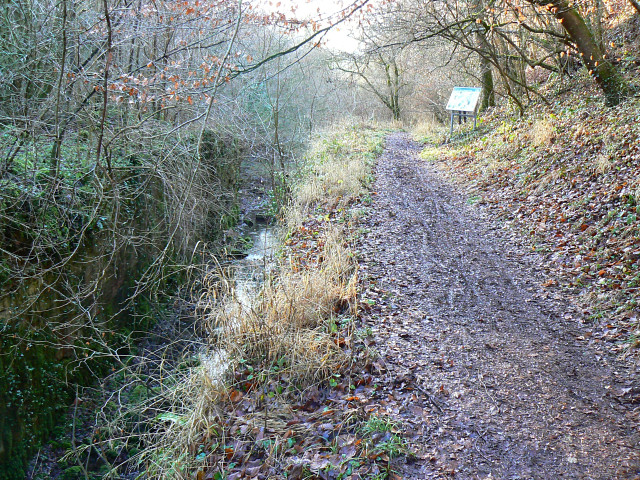
- Siccaridge Wood, Upper Lock 3 on the Thames and Severn canal

- Location within Gloucestershire
- Type: Gloucestershire Wildlife Trust nature reserve
- Location: Frome Valley near Sapperton
- Coordinates: 51°43′50.26″N 2°5′41.25″W
- Area: 68 acres (28 ha)
- Created: 1986
- Operator: Gloucestershire Wildlife Trust Bathurst Estate
- Status: Open all year

Siccaridge Wood (grid reference SO935035) is a 26.6-hectare (66-acre) nature reserve in Gloucestershire. The site is listed in the ‘Stroud District’ Local Plan, adopted November 2005, Appendix 6 (online for download) as a Key Wildlife Site (KWS).

The site is managed by the Gloucestershire Wildlife Trust under leasing arrangements with the Bathurst Estate since 1986. Sponsorship was provided by the then Nature Conservancy Council. Prior to that time the wood was leased to the Forestry Commission.

== Location and habitat ==
The wood is in the Frome Valley and is about half a mile west of Sapperton. It is on a spur of Oolitic limestone and is between the Frome and Holy Brook. It is adjacent to the Sapperton Valley nature reserve and the Daneway Banks Site of Special Scientific Interest nature reserve. This is a high ridge of woodland which has north and south facing slopes. The soil at the bottom is deeper and richer than that at the top which is thin Rendzina soil.

This is semi-natural ancient woodland, which has been managed as coppice for hundreds of years (coppice with standards management). Historically it has been a 'working wood' for timber production, either from mature trees (for ship building for example), or from coppice (for hurdle making and other uses). Some mature trees were removed from the site during the Second World War. Conifer and beech were planted in the 1950s as part of the then management plans, alongside the regeneration of other species following coppicing.

Historical records have been traced to the mid 16th century (1576). At that time it was called Sickeridge Coppice and it belonged to the lord of the manor (being Bisley). The name Siccaridge comes from the old English sicor hrycg which means 'secure, safe ridge'. The Bathhurst Estate acquired the wood in 1861. Records also indicate that there were three cottages at the edge of the wood which were probably woodmans' dwellings. Building evidence has long since disappeared.

It is sited next to the Thames and Severn Canal and access to the reserve is either from the canal towpath or from the road to Daneway and Tunley. The reserve has many footpaths through it and the central open ride is called Morley Ride (after a former chairman of the Gloucestershire Wildlife Trust). This is a woodland of ancient growth, coppice areas and open glades, with a typical woodland ground flora including uncommon species. It is rich is bird life, invertebrates and small mammals.

== Trees and shrubs ==
Regenerating tree species from coppicing include ash, silver birch and beech, along with old pedunculate oak. There is a shrub layer which includes hazel, spindle, wild privet, guelder-rose and the wayfaring-tree. Some of the hazel stools are large.

== Plants ==
The reserve is noted for its flowering of lily-of-the-valley on the slopes of the ridge. Uncommon species include angular Solomon's-seal, herb paris and bird's-nest orchid. There are large areas of bluebell, wood anemone, dog violet, primrose, yellow archangel, ramsons, sanicle and early purple orchid.

== Bird life and mammals ==
Recorded for the reserve are whitethroat, nightingale, turtle dove, coal tit, goldcrest and song thrush.

The reserve supports the common dormouse, which is protected under European and UK legislation. Also recorded are wood mouse and the yellow-necked mouse. fallow deer and roe deer visit the reserve.

== Invertebrates and molluscs ==
Recorded are the pearl-bordered fritillary, silver-washed fritillary and comma, drawn by the open rides and glades. Molluscs recorded include the Roman snail and the great pellucid glass snail.

The wood supports a number of wood ant nests. Some of these may be a good half a metre high and are scattered throughout the reserve.

== Conservation ==
The overall aim is to increase the structure and wildlife diversity of this old woodland. This means thinning to create a 'high forest' and the removal of stands of conifers. Hazel coppice is managed to provide a rotation plan suitable for the dormouse population.

== Walks ==
There is a publication which details walks for recreation and observing wildlife in the Golden Valley. This includes information on Siccaridge Wood and four other nearby nature reserves being Strawberry Banks SSSI, Three Groves Wood, Daneway Banks SSSI and Sapperton Valley. The walk also includes other ancient woodland at Peyton's Grove, Oakridge village, Bakers Mill and Reservoir, Ashmeads Spring, and part of the route of the old Thames and Severn Canal.

== Publications ==
- Kelham, A, Sanderson, J, Doe, J, Edgeley-Smith, M, et al., 1979, 1990, 2002 editions, 'Nature Reserves of the Gloucestershire Trust for Nature Conservation/Gloucestershire Wildlife Trust'
- Siccaridge Wood and Sapperton Valley Nature Reserve – Ancient Dormouse woodland and luxuriant valley wetland', (undated), Gloucestershire Wildlife Trust
- 'The Golden Valley Walk', (undated), Gloucestershire Wildlife Trust
- ‘Nature Reserve Guide – discover the wild Gloucestershire on your doorstep’ - 50th Anniversary, January 2011, Gloucestershire Wildlife Trust
