= Greywell Tunnel =

Canal tunnel on the Basingstoke Canal

- Site of Special Scientific Interest
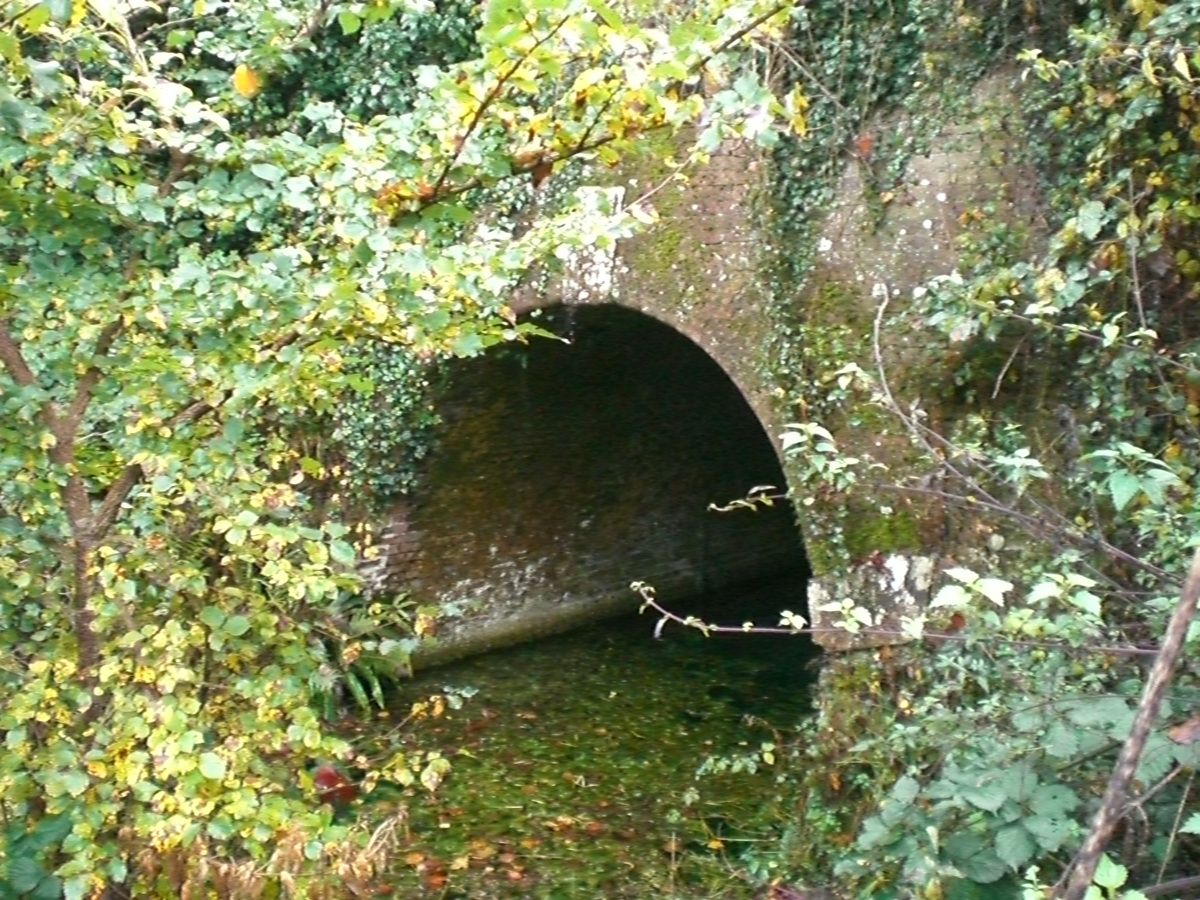
- The eastern portal of the tunnel
- Location of Greywell Tunnel.
- Area of search: Hampshire
- Grid reference: SU 713 516
- Interest: Biological
- Area: 0.4 hectares (0.99 acres)
- Notification date: 1985
- Location map: Magic Map

Greywell Tunnel
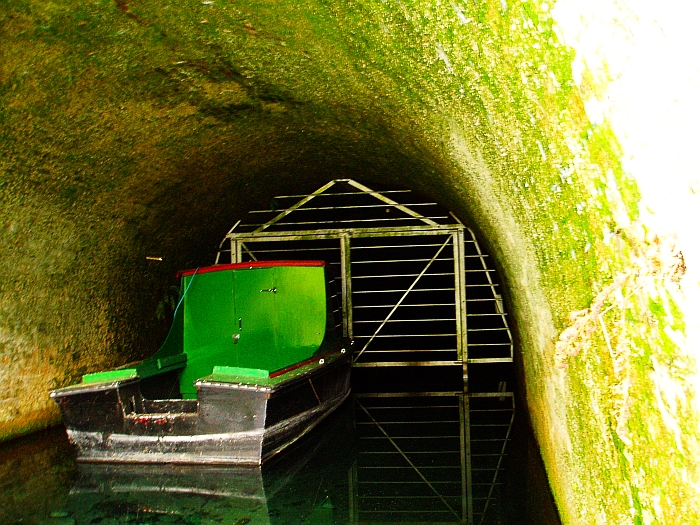
- Inside the Greywell Tunnel
- Interactive map of Greywell Tunnel

Overview
- Location: Greywell
- Coordinates: 51.2605°N 0.978849°W
- OS grid reference: SU713517
- Status: Disused (collapsed)
- Waterway: Basingstoke Canal

Operation
- Constructed: brick
- Opened: 1794
- Closed: 1932

Technical
- Length: 1,230 yards (1,120 m)
- Towpath: no
- Boat-passable: no

Greywell Tunnel is a disused tunnel on the Basingstoke Canal near Greywell in Hampshire, which is now a 0.4-hectare (0.99-acre) biological Site of Special Scientific Interest.

== History ==
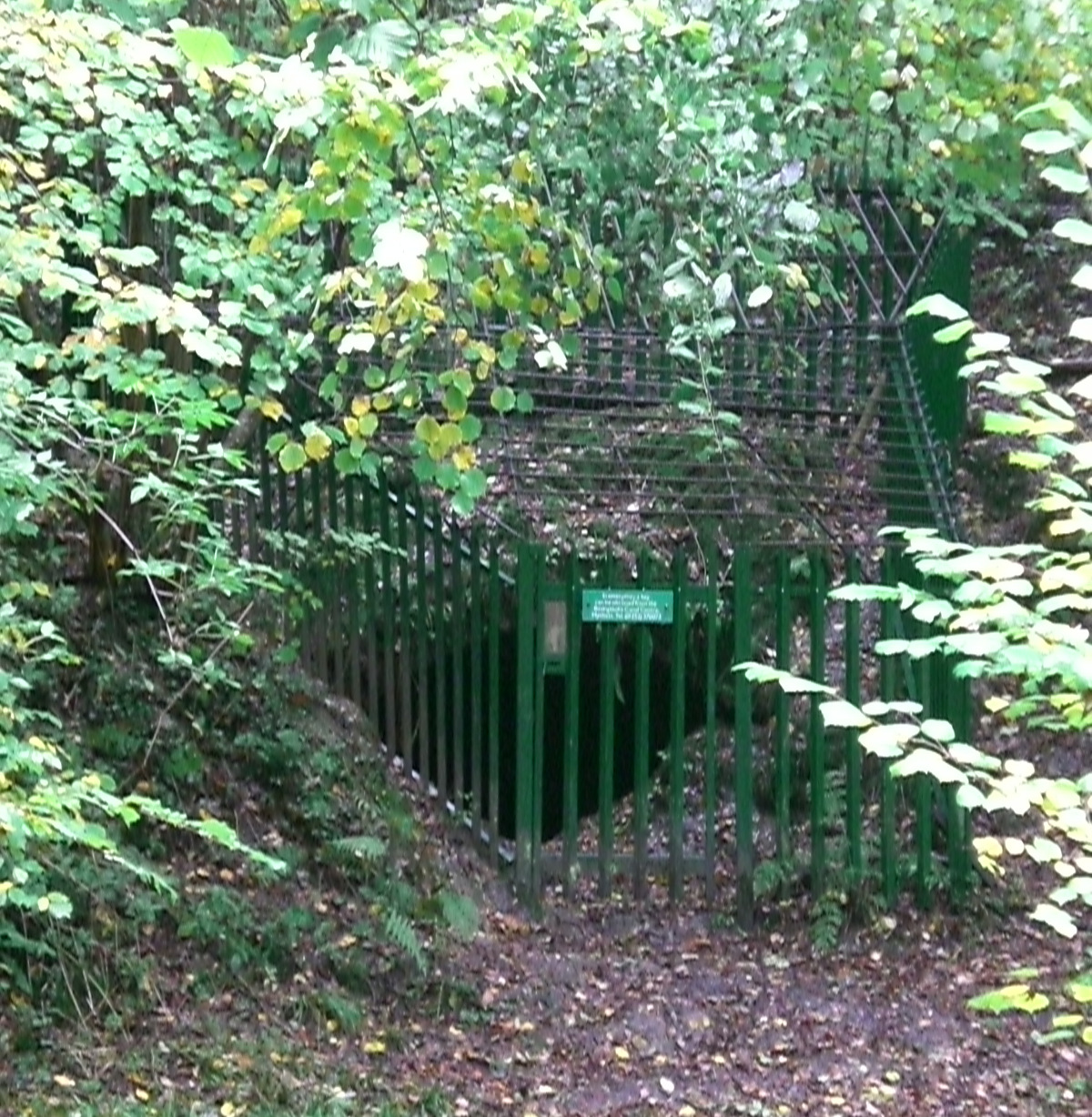
The gated and locked western end of the tunnel, in late 2013. The former portal and a short section of the tunnel has collapsed into the canal and become overgrown.

Construction of the canal had been authorised by the Basingstoke Canal Act 1778 (18 Geo. 3. c. 75), and the engineers John Smeaton, Benjamin Henry Latrobe and William Jessop were appointed in 1787.

After a survey by Jessop the proposed route of the canal was changed to include the tunnel, in order to avoid passing around Tylney Hall whose owner had objected.

The canal construction contract was awarded to John Pinkerton in August 1788, and construction started in October 1788.

The tunnel construction had been initially subcontracted to Charles Jones, even though he had been dismissed by the Thames and Severn Canal company in 1788 after failing to complete the Sapperton Tunnel project; in his defence, he had been asked to build it bigger than originally specified and line it with bricks at no extra cost. However, Jones was dismissed in 1789 after the quality of the tunnel work was criticised. Pinkerton had complained constantly about him.

It is not clear whether Pinkerton then personally supervised the building of the tunnel, but in 1789 the company also sacked its brickmaker, and in 1790 required Pinkerton to ensure that the quality of the brick was adequate for the tunnel work. 223 yards (204 m) of tunnel had been completed by June 1791, and by November 1792 a similar distance was left to be completed.

The canal was fully opened in September 1794. The tunnel had no towpath so boats had to be taken through by legging, taking up to six hours to pass through the tunnel.

The last boat passage through the tunnel was made by the narrowboat Basingstoke over the winter of 1913–1914. Even before this commercial traffic on the western part of the canal had mostly ceased, and the tunnel became impassable when part of it collapsed in 1932. The inaccessible part of the canal to the west was then sold. It was still possible for canoeists to get through the tunnel until the late 1950s, but the blockage is now total, cutting off Basingstoke from the first section of the Basingstoke Canal.

== SSSI ==
The tunnel is of interest for its bat populations: it has more roosting bats than any other site in Britain. The species involved are Natterer's bat (Myotis nattereri), Daubenton's bat (Myotis daubentoni), the whiskered bat (Myotis mystacinus), Brandt's bat (Myotis brandti) and the brown long-eared bat (Plecotus auritus). The tunnel consists of 880 yards (800 m) at the eastern end, which has been cut through chalk, and 153 yards (140 m) at the western end, with 197 yards (180 m) in between, where the bore has filled with soft clay as a result of the collapse. It was first studied for its bat populations in 1975, and was listed as an SSSI in December 1985, after a partial count of the population revealed 541 bats in the first 400 feet (120 m) of the eastern end, from which total numbers were estimated to be around 2,000 animals. The blockage, combined with several springs in the tunnel, creates an ideal micro-climate for the bats, which is maintained at around 10 °C (50 °F) all year. When the temperature outside the tunnel is colder than this, cold air flows into the bottom of the tunnel where it is warmed by the water, and warmer air flows out along the top of the tunnel. During the summer the air flow is reversed, with warm air flowing into the top of the tunnel and being cooled as it flows back out over the water. By 2006, there were some 12,500 bats roosting in the tunnel, which included the largest known colony of Natterer's bat.

== Bibliography ==
- Hadfield, Charles (1969). The Canals of South and South East England. David and Charles. ISBN 0-7153-4693-8.
- Nicholson (2006). Nicholson Guides Vol 7: River Thames and the Southern Waterways. Harper Collins. ISBN 978-0-00-721115-9.
- Skempton, Sir Alec; et al. (2002). A Biographical Dictionary of Civil Engineers in Great Britain and Ireland: Vol 1: 1500 to 1830. Thomas Telford. ISBN 0-7277-2939-X.
