= Strawberry Banks =

Biological Site of Special Scientific Interest in Gloucestershire, England

- Site of Special Scientific Interest
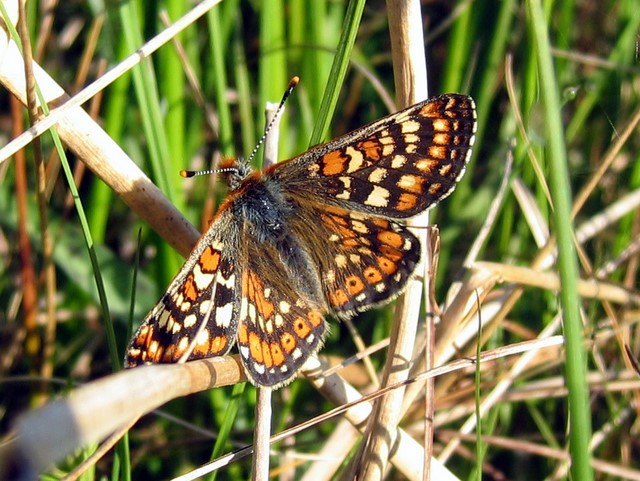
- Example - marsh fritillary (Euphydryas aurinia)
- Location of Strawberry Banks.
- Area of search: Gloucestershire
- Grid reference: SO910033
- Coordinates: 51.7283°N 2.1318°W
- Interest: Biological
- Area: 5.1 ha (13 acres)
- Notification date: 1993

Strawberry Banks (grid reference SO910033) is a 5.06-hectare (12.5-acre) biological Site of Special Scientific Interest in Gloucestershire, notified in 1993.

.The banks are thought to have once been used to grow strawberries, hence the name, and be the crash site of a Second World War German bomber. Strawberry Banks adjoins the Gloucestershire Wildlife Trust Three Groves Wood nature reserve and lies on the west-facing slopes of a small valley in the Cotswolds between the villages of France Lynch and Oakridge. The site is roughly 5 km (3 miles) east of Stroud. Strawberry Banks and Three Groves Wood are part of a group of nature reserves in Stroud's Golden Valley.

The site supports a large population of the marsh fritillary butterfly, and it is also one of the few sites in Britain at which the oil beetle Meloe rugosus occurs.

== Species ==
Further information is in the nature reserves handbook. This oolitic limestone grassland supports a variety of plants and animals. These include the greater butterfly-orchid, bee orchid, common spotted orchid, wild columbine, common rock-rose, milkwort, kidney vetch, wild thyme, yellow rattle and devil's bit scabious during May and June. Green-winged orchid, cowslip, early purple orchid, wood anemone, hairy violet and bluebell can be seen early in the year. In late summer pyramidal orchid, autumn gentian, clustered bellflower, Carline thistle, betony, yellow-wort, marjoram, zigzag clover, small scabious and Dyer's greenweed flower.

This site supports sainfoin, a fodder crop, which was sown many years ago on this and many other Cotswold grasslands.

There are areas of hawthorn, hazel, ash, pedunculate oak, holly and blackthorn scrub. Toothwort, nettle-leaved bellflower, woodruff and sanicle may be found in these areas. A stream, edged with trees and shrubs, runs along the bottom of the banks where meadowsweet, ramsons (wood garlic), brooklime and water figwort may be found.

The site is known for its invertebrate life, including notably marsh fritillary. Other butterflies include small blue, green hairstreak, chalkhill blue, Duke of Burgundy, marbled white, silver-washed fritillary, grizzled skipper, comma and brown argus. Roman snails, heath snail and a rare oil beetle Meloe rugosus are present.

== Conservation ==
The banks have been gently grazed by horses and ponies since 1969, which has helped to maintain the grassland. There is regular cutting of invasive scrub and some of the large beeches at the edge of Three Groves Wood have been felled to increase the area of grassland. This is done to enhance the species rich sward.

== Walks ==
There is a publication which details walks for recreation and observing wildlife in the Golden Valley. This includes information on Strawberry Banks and four other nearby nature reserves being Three Groves Wood, Siccaridge Wood, Daneway Banks SSSI and Sapperton Valley. The walk also includes other ancient woodland at Peyton's Grove, Oakridge village, Bakers Mill and Reservoir, Ashmeads Spring, and part of the route of the old Thames and Severn Canal.

== Publications ==
- Kelham, A, Sanderson, J, Doe, J, Edgeley-Smith, M, et al., 1979, 1990, 2002 editions, 'Nature Reserves of the Gloucestershire Trust for Nature Conservation/Gloucestershire Wildlife Trust'
- 'The Golden Valley Walk', (undated), Gloucestershire Wildlife Trust

== SSSI source ==
- Natural England SSSI information on the citation
- Natural England SSSI information on the Strawberry Bank unit
