= Three Groves Wood =

Nature reserve in Gloucestershire, England

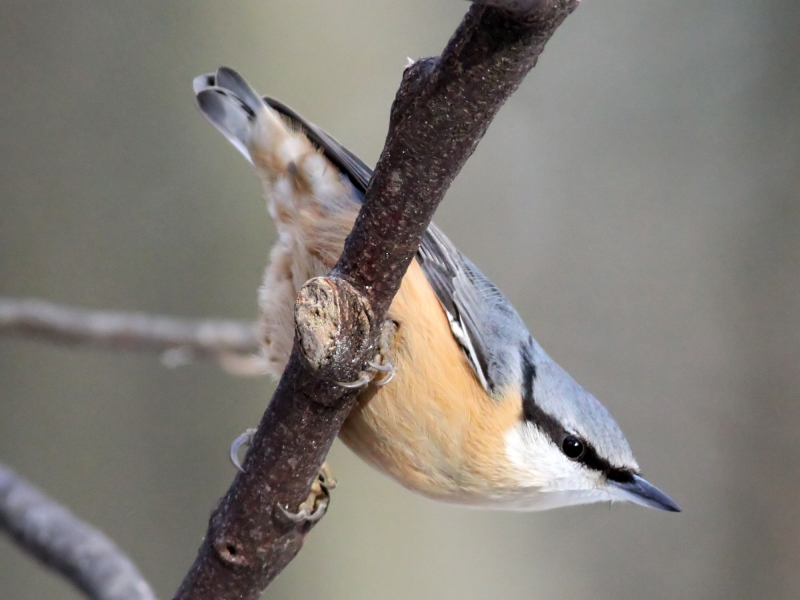
- Example - nuthatch (Sitta europaea)

- Location within Gloucestershire
- Type: Gloucestershire Wildlife Trust nature reserve
- Location: Frome Valley, near Chalford
- Coordinates: 51°43′30.72″N 2°7′41.08″W
- Area: 8 acres (3.2 ha)
- Created: 1986
- Operator: Gloucestershire Wildlife Trust
- Status: Open all year

Three Groves Wood (grid reference SO912029) is a 3.3-hectare (8.2-acre) nature reserve in Gloucestershire. The site is listed in the ‘Stroud District’ Local Plan, adopted November 2005, Appendix 6 (online for download) as a Key Wildlife Site (KWS).

The site is owned and managed by the Gloucestershire Wildlife Trust. It was given to the trust in 1986 (anonymous donor).

== Location and habitat ==
The wood forms part of a much larger area of ancient woodland which is sited on the north side of the Frome Valley. Chalford is about one mile to the west. It is possible that the wood was once part of Oakridge Common and was once subject to commoners' rights, but little history information has been located. It is on Oolitic limestone and there is evidence of small quarries within the wood. There is a public footpath through the wood. There is a stream at the bottom of the slope.

The three separate groves which make up the wood were known as Pearce Grove, Gassons Grove and Teals Grove. The reserve is shady with a diverse ground flora.

== Trees ==
The woodland is dominated by beech, which is typical of the area. Such woodlands were managed for timber production. There is some ash and pedunculate oak amongst the beech. There is old coppice of beech and whitebeam. The shrub layer includes hazel, spindle, yew, crab apple, field maple, holly, guelder-rose and the wayfaring-tree.

== Ground flora ==
Spring flowers include woodruff, primrose, bluebell, wood anemone, yellow archangel and the common dog-violet. Summer flowers include broad-leaved helleborine, stinking hellebore, nettle-leaved bellflower. Grasses include wood barley (Hordelymus europaeus) and wood millet. Ferns are recorded in the quarry areas, such as hart's-tongue and soft shield-fern. Quaking-grass and glaucous sedge grow at the north edge of the wood, encroaching from the adjacent pasture. The stream area supports blue water-speedwell, brooklime and alternate-leaved golden-saxifrage.

== Invertebrates ==
Butterflies recorded include gatekeeper and silver-washed fritillary. Molluscs found in this ancient woodland include Ena montana and Zenobiella subrufescens.

== Bird life ==
Birds on the reserve include nuthatch, green woodpecker and spotted flycatcher.

== Conservation ==
Woodland management is important to maintain sufficient light to support the ground flora. This includes thinning the beech trees, coppicing hazel and opening up glades

== Walks ==
There is a publication which details walks for recreation and observing wildlife in the Golden Valley. This includes information on Three Groves Wood and four other nearby nature reserves being Strawberry Banks SSSI, Siccaridge Wood, Daneway Banks SSSI and Sapperton Valley. The walk also includes other ancient woodland at Peyton's Grove, Oakridge village, Bakers Mill and Reservoir, Ashmeads Spring, and part of the route of the old Thames and Severn Canal.

== Publications ==
- Kelham, A, Sanderson, J, Doe, J, Edgeley-Smith, M, et al., 1979, 1990, 2002 editions, 'Nature Reserves of the Gloucestershire Trust for Nature Conservation/Gloucestershire Wildlife Trust'
- 'The Golden Valley Walk', (undated), Gloucestershire Wildlife Trust
- ‘Nature Reserve Guide – discover the wild Gloucestershire on your doorstep’ - 50th Anniversary, January 2011, Gloucestershire Wildlife Trust
