= Axmansford =

Village in Hampshire, England

Coordinates: 51.34°N 01.19°W

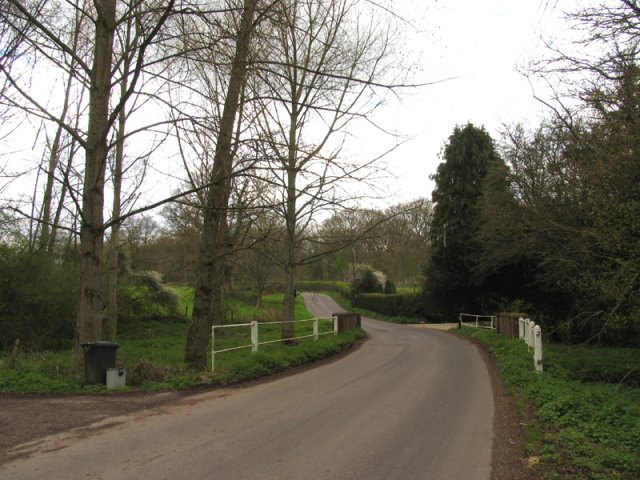

- Location within Hampshire
- OS grid reference: SU5661
- Civil parish: Baughurst
- District: Basingstoke and Deane
- Shire county: Hampshire
- Region: South East
- Country: England
- Sovereign state: United Kingdom
- Post town: Tadley
- Postcode district: RG26
- Police: Hampshire and Isle of Wight
- Fire: Hampshire and Isle of Wight
- Ambulance: South Central
- UK Parliament: North West Hampshire

Axmansford is a village in Hampshire, England. It is in the civil parish of Baughurst.
