= Coates, Gloucestershire =

Village and civil parish in Gloucestershire, England

Coordinates: 51°42′20″N 2°1′56″W

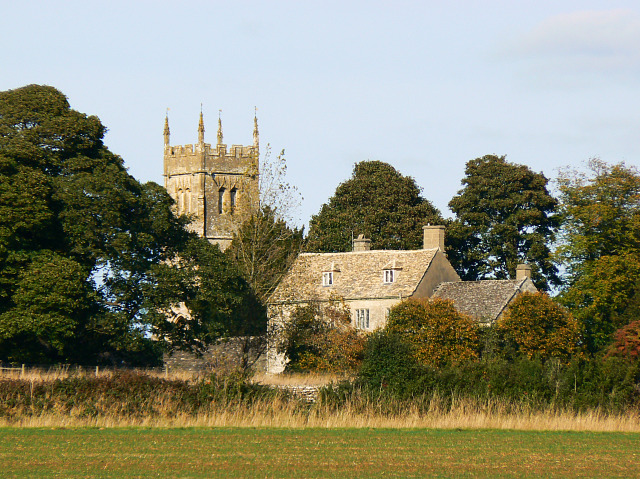
Church Farm, Coates

Coates is a village and civil parish situated in Cotswold District, Gloucestershire, England. It is around 3 miles (4.8 km) west of Cirencester and close to Cirencester Park, part of the Bathurst Estate. It is the nearest village to the source of the river Thames at Thames Head, and it is close to the course of the Foss Way or Fosse Way, the ancient Roman road. The nearest railway station is Kemble. The village population taken at the 2021 census was 491.

The parish church of St Matthew's (now part of the Thameshead Benefice) dates to the 13th century. The Grade II* listed building has a Perpendicular tower, 13th-century piscina, Norman font and a Norman doorway. From 1.

From 1799 to 1847, the Vicar of Coates was Bryan Mackey, one of the first Black British Anglican clergymen.

Bernard Vann, VC, spent much of his childhood in Coates rectory, where his mother was housekeeper to the Rev. T. C. Simpson, his uncle. He is commemorated in the church.

The village was home to the Coates Cricket Club that played in the Cotswold District League, until the club disbanded after the 2016 season. The Tunnel House Inn, adjacent to the Sapperton Canal Tunnel, is just beyond the edge of the village towards Tarlton. The Royal Agricultural University's Rural Skills Centre was previously located on the eastern side of the village in the buildings that were previously Coates Farm, however this has since been relocated to Harnhill, four miles (6.4 km) south-east of Cirencester.
