= Frampton Mansell =

English village near Stroud, Gloucestershire

Coordinates: 51.7216°N 2.1149°W

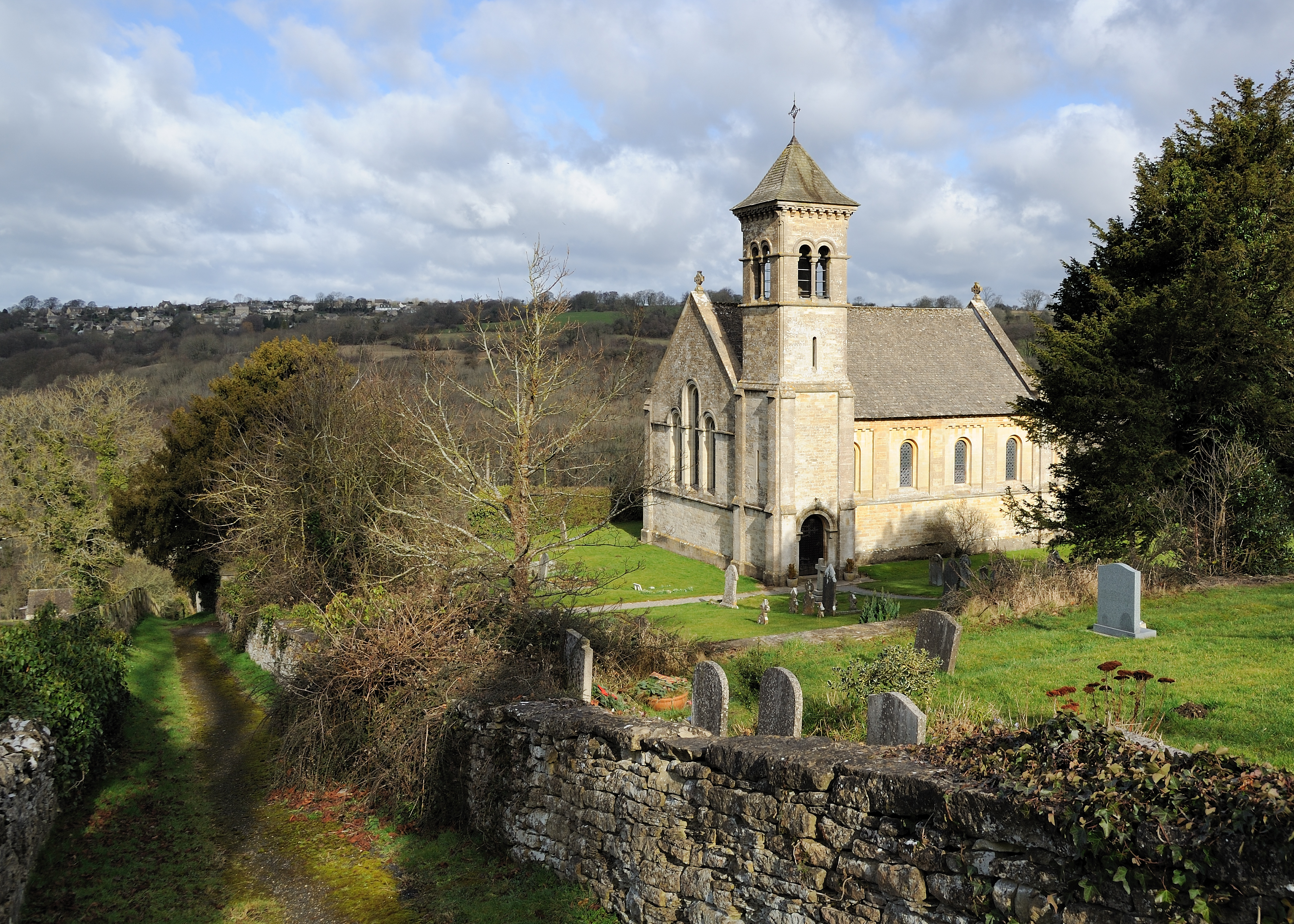
- St Luke's Church, Frampton Mansell

- Location within Gloucestershire
- Civil parish: Sapperton
- District: Cotswold
- Shire county: Gloucestershire
- Region: South West
- Country: England
- Sovereign state: United Kingdom
- Post town: Stroud
- Postcode district: GL6
- Police: Gloucestershire
- Fire: Gloucestershire
- Ambulance: South Western
- UK Parliament: North Cotswolds

Frampton Mansell is a small English village 5 miles (8 km) east-south-east of Stroud, Gloucestershire, in the parish of Sapperton. It lies off the A419 road between Stroud and Cirencester. It has a prominent mid-19th century, Grade II listed church with a set of five original stained-glass windows.

== Village ==
Frampton Mansell takes its name from the valley of the River Frome, in which it lies. It was first mentioned in the 1086 Domesday Book, as Frantone. The Victoria County History found one reference to it as Moises Frampton in 1462/3. In the 13th century, the manor passed to the Maunsell family, from whom the second part of the name derives.

Frampton has a village hall and a pub, the Crown Inn – a "cider house" that also offers meals and accommodation. The Thames and Severn Canal, the river and the railway all follow the valley down towards Stroud. The railway viaduct is a prominent feature. Occasional steam excursions along the valley are popular with trainspotters.

The village is served by several bus routes. Destinations include Stroud, Gloucester and Cheltenham. The nearest railway station is at Stroud, 6.6 miles (10.6 km) away.

== Parish church ==
St Luke's Church in Frampton Mansell was built in 1843 by Lord Bathurst as a chapel of ease for the village, and consecrated the following year. It saved local churchgoers a two-mile walk to Sapperton Church.

St Luke's is an English Heritage Grade II listed building in a prominent hilltop position. Designed by J. Parish, it is in a neo-Romanesque style reminiscent of the Alpine churches of northern Italy. A set of five original stained-glass windows lighting the apse are dedicated to Christ and the four Evangelists: Matthew, Mark, Luke and John.

The church and its congregation belong to the Diocese of Gloucester and the Thameshead group of parishes. Closure in 1979 was averted by founding a new local charity to restore and maintain the building. There is a Sunday service about four times a month.
