= Sapperton Canal Tunnel =

Tunnel on the Thames and Severn Canal near Cirencester in Gloucestershire, England

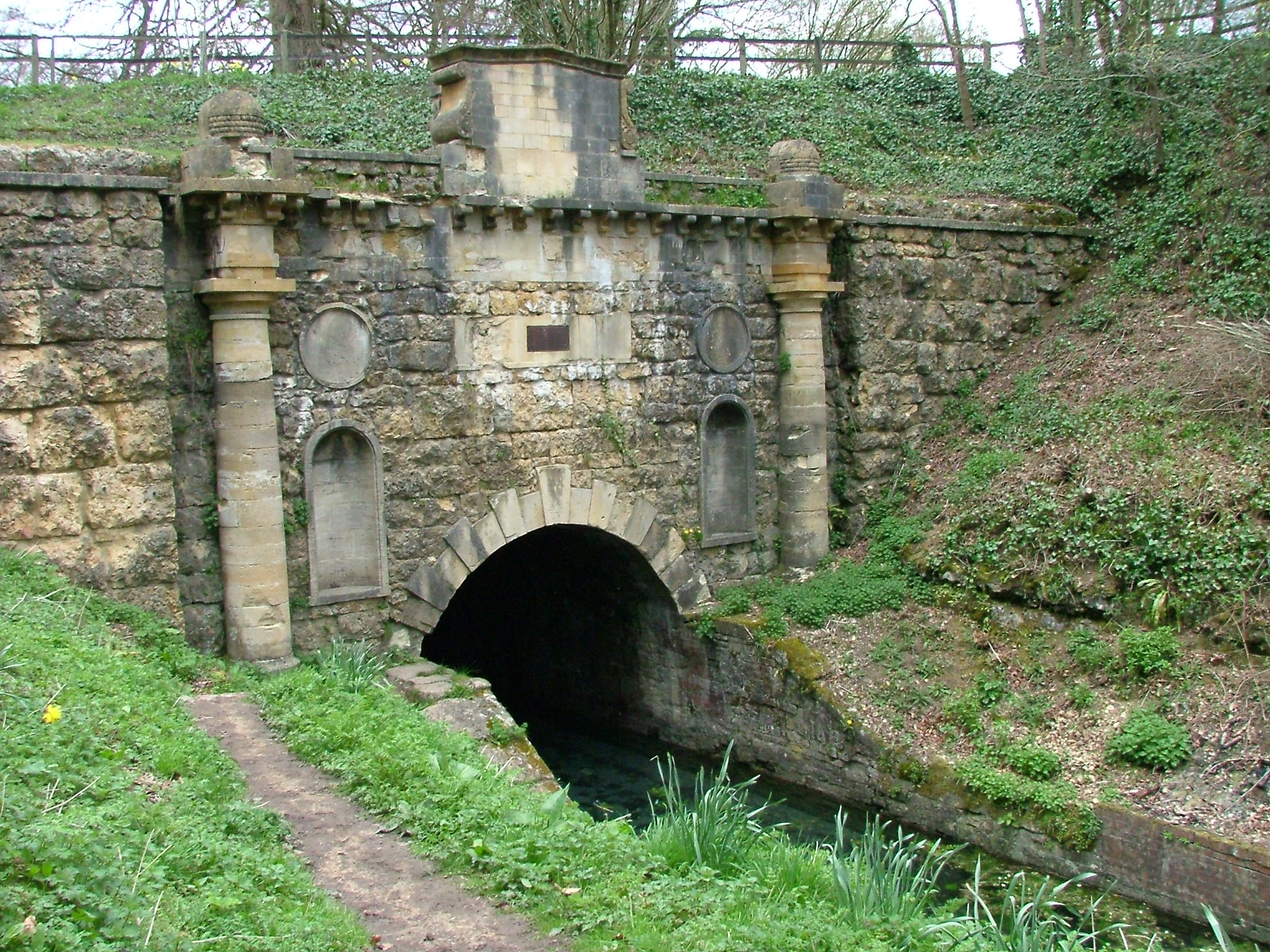
- The Coates Portal at the south-eastern end of the Sapperton Canal Tunnel
- Interactive map of Sapperton Canal Tunnel

Overview
- Location: Sapperton, Gloucestershire
- Coordinates: 51.7162°N 2.0666°W
- OS grid reference: SO955019
- Status: disused, partially collapsed
- Waterway: Thames and Severn Canal
- Start: 51.7287°N 2.0828°W
- End: 51.7041°N 2.0504°W

Operation
- Opened: 20 April 1789
- Closed: c. 1910

Technical
- Length: 3,817 yards (3,490 m)
- Towpath: No

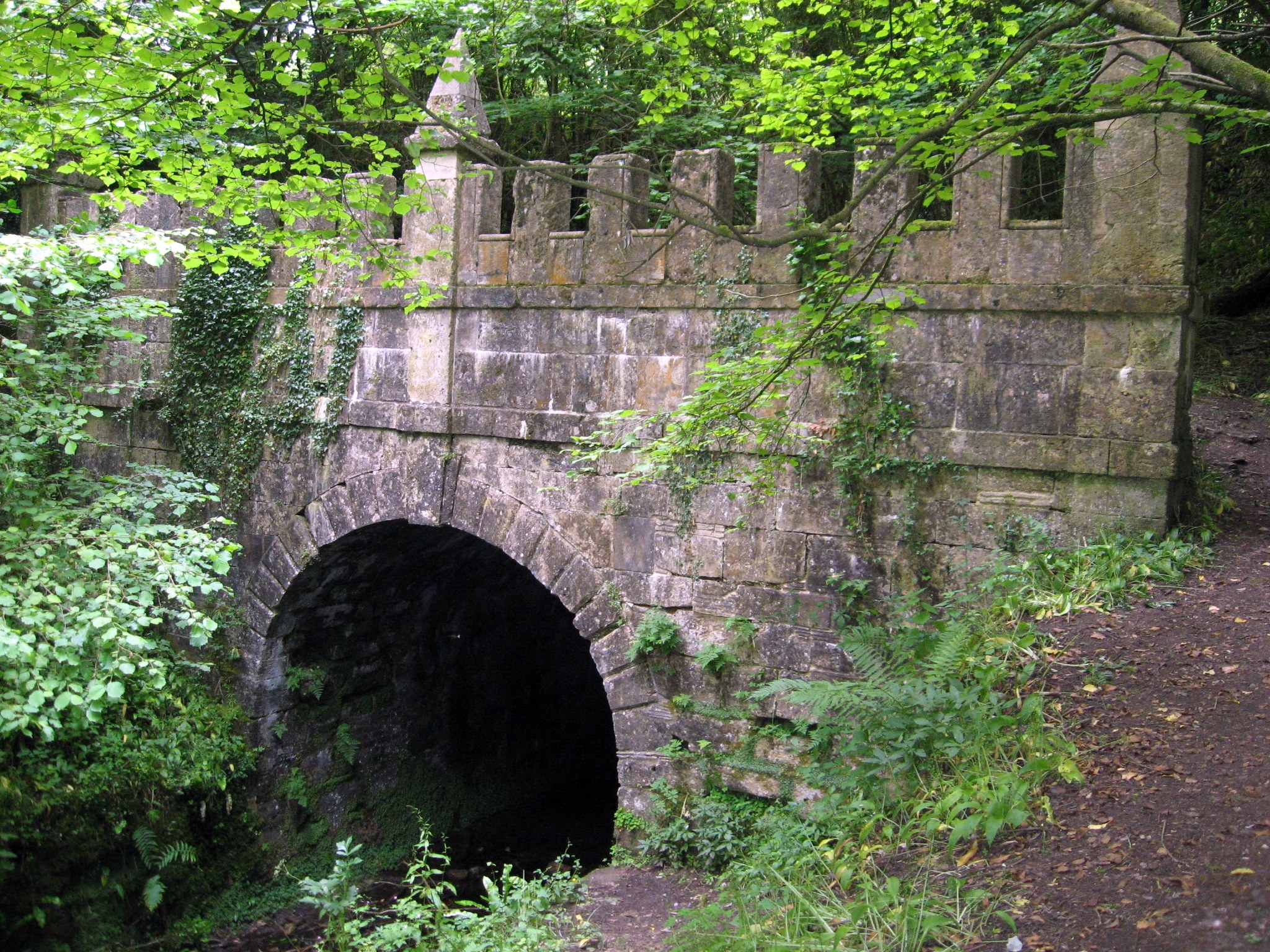
Daneway portal – Sapperton Tunnel

The Sapperton Canal Tunnel is a tunnel on the Thames and Severn Canal near Cirencester in Gloucestershire, England. With a length of 3,817 yards (3,490 m), it was the longest tunnel of any kind in England from 1789 to 1811.

Construction, following the Thames and Severn Canal Act 1783 (23 Geo. 3. c. 38), an act of Parliament, began in 1784. Twenty-six shafts were dug along the line of the tunnel and workfaces dug in each direction eventually joining up before the diameter of the tunnel was expanded. Difficulties were encountered related to strata of Great Oolite (solid limestone) and Fuller's Earth clay. These caused roof falls and narrowing of the channel which continued after the tunnel opened in 1789 and required frequent maintenance. The stone portals at either end are listed buildings.

Boats passed through by legging until 1911. The canal was abandoned by 1933 and subsequent roof falls mean that it is no longer navigable. Cotswold Canals Trust have proposed restoration.

== History ==
The Thames and Severn Canal was authorised by the Thames and Severn Canal Act 1783 (23 Geo. 3. c. 38) on 17 April 1783 but details of the tunnel had not been worked out, and arguments about its size continued for two to three months. Regular barges on the Severn were trows which were 15 feet (4.6 m) wide; those on the Thames were Thames barges, 12 feet (3.7 m) wide. The only long tunnel in the country at the time was Harecastle Tunnel, suitable for narrow boats just 7 feet (2.1 m) wide. A party of Commissioners from the Thames thought that the cost of a wide tunnel would be prohibitive, and that it should be built for narrow-beam boats, with the trows or barges unloading their cargos at each end of the tunnel.

By late summer, the decision had been taken to build a broad tunnel, 15 feet (4.6 m) high and wide, and the company advertised for tunnellers in September. The tunnel would be 3,817 yards (3,490 m) long and 65 metres (213 ft) below ground at its deepest point. It was expected to take four years to complete, beginning in early 1784. To speed the work, 26 shafts were sunk for many simultaneous workfaces, the deepest of which was 244 feet (74 m). Small tunnels, known as headings, were dug in two different directions from the base of each shaft and the spoil lifted up the shaft and dumped in spoil tips above the route of the canal. A small temporary railway was later installed to take workers into the tunnel and remove waste materials. The use of explosives to expand the headings to the full size of the tunnel meant that acrid smoke and foul air built up. Chimneys were built in the shafts, with fires at their base to try to remove the foul air. The construction contract was awarded to Charles Jones, who managed to build about one third of it, but then had financial difficulties, and so other contractors were engaged to work on smaller sections.

Difficulties during construction included different strata. Great Oolite (solid limestone) has water permeable fissure which led to rock falls and spring formation and, during dry periods, the water leaking out of the canal. In areas where the tunnel went through Fuller's Earth clay it had to be lined with brick. When the Fuller's Earth expanded this could lead to roof falls and pushed up the base of the tunnel reducing the depth of water for the boats passing through it.

The tunnel was opened on 20 April 1789, after five years of construction. It has no towpath; boats were propelled through the tunnel by legging. There were some defects in the workmanship, causing closure for ten weeks' repairs after a year. Further attempts to repair and stabilise the walls included the insertion of oak beams at the base to stop the sides of the tunnel moving inwards as the clay expanded and, in 1904, a concrete lining to some sections.

It was superseded as the longest canal tunnel in England in 1811 by the Huddersfield Narrow Canal's Standedge Tunnel, at 5,456 yards (4,989 m) long, afterwards lengthened, that remains the highest, longest and deepest instance in Britain – which only accommodates 7-foot-wide narrowboats (2.1 m). Strood Tunnel on the Thames and Medway Canal was 3,946 yards (3,608 m) when it opened in 1824, but was interrupted six years later by a short section to create a passing basin.

The last commercial traffic passed through the tunnel in 1911 and in 1916 further roof falls occurred. The whole canal was abandoned by 1933.

The tunnel was passable until at least 1966, but is now blocked by roof collapses over several hundred yards, mainly in sections where the ground is fuller's earth. Restoration is proposed by the Cotswold Canals Trust as part of their project to re-open a direct route between Thames and Severn. The trust has operated tourist boat trips into the tunnel in winter months.

The Sapperton railway tunnel, on the Golden Valley Line, follows a similar route under the 'Cotswold Edge'.

There have been proposals to pump water from the River Severn toward the periodically water-stressed Thames Basin; if so the tunnel and canal eastward could be used for this.

=== Portals ===
The northern portal near Sapperton village was built between 1784 and 1789 by Josiah Clowes. It was restored in 1996.

The southern Coates portal was built by the engineer Robert Whitworth and has doric columns and vermiculated masonry. It was restored in 1980.

== In fiction ==
In Hornblower and the Atropos by C.S. Forester, Hornblower helps the boatman "leg" through Sapperton Tunnel after the boatman's assistant is incapacitated. Forester spends the first two chapters of the book on the canal-boat journey, Roughly a third of the first chapter is devoted to the tunnel.

In the thriller novel Gone by Mo Hayder, the tunnel is used extensively as a location.

An episode of Midsomer Murders titled The Green Man (series 7 episode 1) was partly filmed at the tunnel.

The tunnel plays a significant part in Slaughter in the Sapperton Tunnel by Edward Marston.

== Coordinates ==
Point	Coordinates (links to map & photo sources)
Daneway portal	51.7287°N 2.0828°W
Midpoint	51.7162°N 2.0666°W
Coates portal	51.7041°N 2.0504°W

== See also ==
- List of canal tunnels in the United Kingdom

Records
Preceded by Brindley's Harecastle Tunnel	Longest tunnel 1789–1811	Succeeded by Standedge Tunnels
