= Sapperton, Gloucestershire =

Village in Gloucestershire, England

Coordinates: 51.731°N 2.077°W

Sapperton
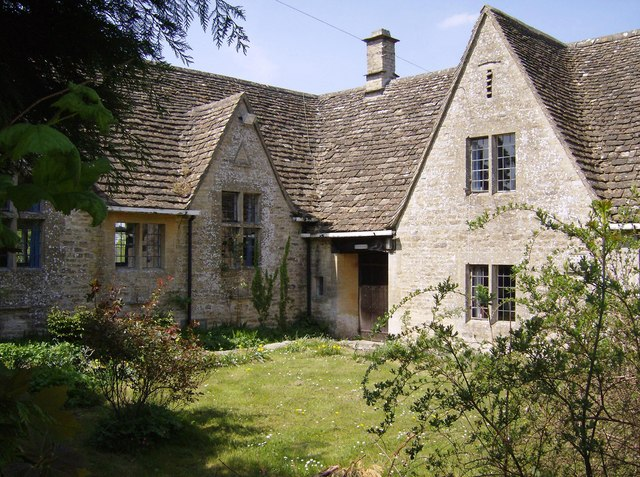
- Sapperton Village Hall

- Location within Gloucestershire
- Population: 412 (2011)
- OS grid reference: SO9403
- Civil parish: Sapperton
- District: Cotswold
- Shire county: Gloucestershire
- Region: South West
- Country: England
- Sovereign state: United Kingdom
- Post town: Cirencester
- Postcode district: GL7
- Police: Gloucestershire
- Fire: Gloucestershire
- Ambulance: South Western
- UK Parliament: North Cotswolds

Sapperton is a village and civil parish in the Cotswold District of Gloucestershire in England, about 4.5 miles (7.2 km) west of Cirencester. It is most famous for Sapperton Canal Tunnel, and its connection with the Cotswold Arts and Crafts Movement in the early 20th century. It had a population of 424, which had reduced to 412 at the 2011 census.

The parish includes the villages of Sapperton and Frampton Mansell. The outlying hamlet of Daneway lies in the parish of Bisley, but is nearer to the village of Sapperton and often considered a part of it.

== History and architecture ==
The Domesday Book of 1086 lists the village as Sapleton.

There are many interesting buildings in Sapperton associated with the leading designers of the Arts and Crafts movement in the area, as well as the church, primary school, and a pub.

Sir Robert Atkyns, the county historian and author of The Ancient and Present State of Gloucestershire (1712), lived in the manor house of the village, now demolished, in the early 18th century. The manor was later acquired by the Bathurst family, who still own most of the village and land.

Most of the buildings in the eastern part of the village were built (or rebuilt) under the patronage of the Bathurst family in the Cotswold Arts and Crafts style. Upper Dorvel House and Beechanger, designed and built by the brothers Ernest (died 1925) and Sidney Barnsley (died 1926), and the Leasowes, built by their colleague Ernest Gimson (d. 1919) are to the north-east of the Church.

Norman Jewson (1884–1975), friend and associate of Gimson, and son-in-law to Ernest Barnsley, lived at Bachelors' Court. His memoir, By Chance I did Rove (1952; twice reprinted) of village life and his association with the Gimson circle at the turn of the twentieth century is recognised as a minor classic of Cotswold literature.

St Kenelm is the parish church. It was last rebuilt during Queen Anne's reign. It contains a monument to Sir Robert Atkyns and another to Sir Henry and Lady Anne Poole.

== Population ==
- 1086 – 39 tenants (parish)
- 1801 – 351
- 1901 – 422
- 1961 – 377

== Famous people ==
- Charles I stayed at Sapperton House on 13 July 1644.
- George III came here to view the making of the Sapperton Tunnel in 1788.
- Sir Richard Stafford Cripps is buried here.
- Robert Addie an English actor, grew up in Sapperton.
- The Sappington family name is said to originate from here.

== In film ==
The village was used for filming most of the outdoor scenes in Cider with Rosie (1998), set in the 1920s and 1930s, with the main street gravelled to overcome the modern road surface.

== See also ==
- Sapperton Tunnel
- Sapperton Canal Tunnel
- Frampton Mansell
- Ernest Gimson
- Norman Jewson
- Peter Waals
- Cirencester House
- Earl Bathurst
