= List of places in Gloucestershire =

Some of the larger settlements of Gloucestershire.

This is a list of cities, towns and villages in the county of Gloucestershire, England. For places in the district of South Gloucestershire, see that article. For places in Bristol formerly in Gloucestershire, see Subdivisions of Bristol.

== A ==
- Abbeymead, Abenhall, Ablington, Acton Turville, Adlestrop, Alderley, Alderton, Alderton Fields, Aldsworth, Alkerton, Alkington, Allaston, Alstone (Cheltenham), Alstone (near Tewkesbury), Alvington, Amberley, Ampney Crucis, Ampney St Mary, Ampney St Peter, Andoversford, Anthony's Cross, Apperley, Arle, Arlebrook, Arlingham, Arlington, Ashchurch, Ashleworth, Ashley, Ashton under Hill, Aston Cross, Aston Magna, Aston Subedge, Avening, Awre, Aylburton, Aylworth

== B ==
- Badgeworth, Bagendon, Bagpath, Baker's Hill, Ball's Green, Bamfurlong, Barnsley, Barrington, Barrow, Barrow Wake, Barton, Barton End, Batsford, Battledown, Battlescombe, Baunton, Beachley, Bencombe, Bengrove, Berkeley, Berkeley Vale, Berry Hill, Beverston, Bibstone, Bibury, Birdlip, Bishop's Cleeve, Bishop's Norton, Bisley, Bisley-with-Lypiatt, Bitton, Blaisdon, Blakeney, Bledington, Blockley, Boddington, Bondend, Boughspring, Boulsdon, Bournes Green, Bournside, Bournstream, Bourton-on-the-Hill, Bourton on the Water, Bowbridge, Box, Boxbush, Boxwell, Boxwell with Leighterton, Brain's Green, Brand Green, Breadstone, Bream, Brimpsfield, Brimscombe, Broad Campden, Broadwell, Cotswold, Broadwell, Forest of Dean, Brockhampton, Brockweir, Brockworth, Bromsberrow, Bromsberrow Heath, Brookthorpe, Brookthorpe-with-Whaddon, Buckland, Bussage

== C ==
- Cainscross, Calcot, Calcott's Green, Cam, Cambridge, Cashes Green, Chaceley, Chalford, Charlton Abbots, Charlton Kings, Chaxhill, Chedworth, Cheltenham, Chipping Campden, Churchdown, Churchend, Cinderford, Cirencester, Clapton-on-the-Hill, Clearwell, Cleeve Hill, Coaley, Coaley Peak, Coalway, Coberley, Cold Ashton, Cold Aston, Coldharbour, Coleford, Colesbourne, Coln Rogers, Coln St. Aldwyns, Coln St. Dennis, Colthrope, Compton Abdale, Condicote, Coombe, Coombe Hill, Corse, Cowley, Cranham, Cutsdean

== D ==
- Daglingworth, Daylesford, Deerhurst, Didbrook, Didmarton, Dixton, Donnington, Doughton, Down Ampney, Draycott, Driffield, Drybrook, Dumbleton, Duntisbourne Abbots, Dursley, Dymock

== E ==
- Earthcott, East Dean, Eastington, Cotswold, Eastington, Stroud, Eastcombe, Edgeworth, Elmstone Hardwicke, Ellwood, Elmbridge, English Bicknor, Elmore Back, Elkstone, Evenlode, Epney

== F ==
- Fairford, Filton, Flaxley, Ford, Forthampton, Framilode, Frampton Cotterell, Frampton Mansell, Frampton-on-Severn, Fretherne, Frocester, Frocester Hill, Fyfield

== G ==
- Ganborough, Gloucester, Gorsley, Gotherington, Greet, Gretton, Gotherington, Guiting Power, Great Rissington, Great Witcombe,

== H ==
- Ham, Hampnett, Hardwicke (Elmstone-Hardwicke), Hardwicke (Stroud), Haresfield, Harrow Hill, Hartpury, Hasfield, Hatherop, Hawkesbury Upton, Hawling, Hazleton, Hempsted, Henbury, Hewelsfield, Hidcote Boyce, Highnam, Hillesley, Hinchwick, Hinton (South Gloucestershire), Hinton (Stroud), Horsley, Hucclecote, Huntley

== I ==
- Icomb, Innsworth

== J ==
- Joys Green

== K ==
- Kemble, Kempley, Kempsford, Kent's Green, Kilcot, Kineton, King's Stanley, Kingscote, Kingsway Village, Kingswood, South Gloucestershire, Kingswood, Stroud District, Knightsbridge

== L ==
- Lasborough, Lassington, Laverton, Lechlade, Leckhampton, Leigh, Leighterton, Leonard Stanley, Little Rissington, Little Witcombe, Little Barrington, Littledean, Little London, Long Newnton, Longborough, Longford, Longhope, Longlevens, Longney, Lower Slaughter, Lower Apperley, Lower Berry Hill, Lower Cam, Lower Dowdeswell, Lower Lemington, Lower Oddington, Lower Swell, Lower Wick, Luxley, Lydbrook, Lydney, Lypiatt

== M ==
- Maisemore, May Hill, Meysey Hampton, Mickleton, Milkwall, Minchinhampton, Miserden, Mitcheldean, Moreton-in-Marsh, Moreton Valence, Minsterworth

== N ==
- Nailsworth, Naunton, Newent, Newington Bagpath, Newland, Newnham on Severn, Newport, North Nibley, Northleach, Northway, Northwick, Norton, Notgrove, Nympsfield

== O ==
- Oakle Street, Oakley, Oakridge, Oddington, Okle Green, Oldbury-on-the-Hill, Oldcroft, Over (South Gloucestershire), Over (Tewkesbury), Owlpen, Oxenton, Ozleworth

== P ==
- Painswick, Parkend, Parton, Piff's Elm, Pillowell, Pope's Hill, Poulton, Prestbury, Priding, Prior's Norton, Purton near Berkeley, Purton near Lydney

== Q ==
- Quedgeley, Quenington

== R ==
- Randwick, The Reddings, Redmarley D'Abitot, Rendcomb, Rodborough, Ruardean, Ruardean Woodside

== S ==
- Saintbury, Salperton, Sandhurst, Sapperton, Saul, Sedbury, Seven Springs, Sevenhampton, Sharpness, Sheepscombe, Sherborne, Shipton Moyne, Shipton, Shorncote, Shurdington, Shuthonger, Siddington, Siston, Slad, Slimbridge, Snig's End, Snowshill, Somerford Keynes, South Cerney, Southam, Southrop, St. Briavels, Stanton, Stanway, Staunton, nr. Coleford, Staunton, on A417, Staverton, Staverton Bridge, Stinchcombe, Stoke Orchard, Stone, Stonehouse, Stow-on-the-Wold, Stowe, Stowell, Stratfod, Stratton, Stroat, Stroud Green, Stroud, Stow-on-the-Wold, Sudgrove, Sunhill, Swindon Village, Syde

== T ==
- Taynton, Teddington, Tetbury, Tewkesbury, Tidenham, Thrupp, Toddington, Tredington, Temple Guiting, Tibberton, Througham Slad, Todenham, Tresham, Tuffley, Twyning

== U ==
- Uckington, Uley, Ullenwood, Up Hatherley, Upleadon, Upper Dowdeswell, Upper Slaughter, Upper Coberley, Upper Oddington, Upper Swell, Upper Framilode, Upper Soudley, Upper Lydbrook, Upton St Leonards, Upper Rissington

== V ==
- Viney Hill

== W ==
- Walton Cardiff, Whiteshill, Whiteway Colony, Whitminster, Winchcombe, Winson, Winstone, Witcombe, Withybridge, Woodchester, Woodmancote near Cirencester, Woodmancote near Dursley, Woodmancote near Cheltenham, Woolaston, Wotton-under-Edge, Wyck Rissington

== Y ==
- Yanworth, Yorkley

== See also ==
- List of settlements in Gloucestershire by population
- List of places in England
