= GL postcode area =

Postcode area within the United Kingdom

Gloucester
- Postcode area
- Location within the United Kingdom
- Coordinates: 51.833°N 2.181°W
- Sovereign state: United Kingdom
- Postcode area: GL
- Postcode area name: Gloucester
- Post towns: 28
- Postcode districts: 27
- Postcode sectors: 117
- Postcodes (live): 21,027
- Postcodes (total): 28,597
- Statistics as at May 2020

The GL postcode area, also known as the Gloucester postcode area, is a group of 27 postcode districts in south-west and south-western central England and a very small part of south-east Wales, within 28 post towns. These cover most of Gloucestershire, including Gloucester, Cheltenham, Stroud, Cirencester, Tewkesbury, Badminton, Berkeley, Blakeney, Chipping Campden, Cinderford, Coleford, Drybrook, Dursley, Dymock, Fairford, Lechlade, Longhope, Lydbrook, Lydney, Mitcheldean, Moreton-in-Marsh, Newent, Newnham, Ruardean, Stonehouse, Tetbury, Westbury-on-Severn and Wotton-under-Edge. The area also covers very small parts of Herefordshire, Worcestershire, Warwickshire, Oxfordshire and Wiltshire, while the GL16 district extends across the Welsh border to cover a very small part of Monmouthshire.

The Mail Centre for GL has been at Bristol (Filton) since the Gloucester Mail Centre closed in c. 2014

The area's districts are numbered sequentially from GL1 to GL20, then from GL50 to GL56 for Cheltenham and settlements immediately around and to its east.

GL17 has the most alternative post towns in England: covering an upper part of the Forest of Dean studded with isolated large villages, five are recognised as post towns within one postcode district.

== Coverage ==
The approximate coverage of the postcode districts:

| Postcode district | Post town | Coverage | Local authority area(s) |
|---|---|---|---|
| GL1 | GLOUCESTER | The Docks, Central Gloucester, Kingsholm | Gloucester |
| GL2 | GLOUCESTER | Arlingham, Cambridge, Churcham, Churchdown, Down Hatherley, Elmore, Framilode, Frampton on Severn, Hardwicke, Hempsted, Highnam, Kingsway, Longford, Longlevens, Longney, Maisemore, Minsterworth, Moreton Valence, Norton, Over, Podsmead, Priors Norton, Quedgeley, Rudford, Sandhurst, Saul, Slimbridge, Tibberton (east), Twigworth, Walham, Waterwells Business Park, Whitminster | Gloucester, Stroud, Tewkesbury, Forest of Dean |
| GL3 | GLOUCESTER | Barnwood, Brockworth, Churchdown, Coopers Hill, Gloucester Business Park, Great Witcombe, Hucclecote, Innsworth, Little Witcombe, (Note: includes GL3 4SX) Witcombe (Note: includes GL3 4SJ) | Tewkesbury, Gloucester, Stroud |
| GL4 | GLOUCESTER | Abbeydale, Abbeymead, Barnwood, Birdlip, Brimpsfield, Brookthorpe, Cranham, Harescombe, Matson, Tuffley, Upton St Leonards, Whaddon (Note: includes GL4 0UA) | Gloucester, Stroud, Cotswold |
| GL5 | STROUD | Amberley, Bourne, Bowbridge, Brimscombe, Burleigh, Butterrow Hill, Cainscross, Cashes Green, Dudbridge, Dunkirk Mills, Ebley, Gaineys Well, Inchbrook, Kingscourt, Lightpill, Little London, Middle Leazes, North Woodchester, Paganhill, Randwick, Rodborough, Rodborough Common, Selsley, Selsley East, Selsley Hill, Selsley West, South Woodchester, Thrupp, Uplands, (Note: includes GL5 1GR) Wallbridge, Walls Quarry, Woodchester | Stroud |
| GL6 | STROUD | Aston Down, Bell Pitch, Bird in Hand, Bisley, Bournes Green, Box, Brownshill, Bussage, Chalford, Chalford Hill, Eastcombe, Edge, Edgeworth, Elcombe, Far Oakridge, Far Westrip, Forest Green, Frampton Mansell, France Lynch, Horsley, Lower Kitesnest, Lypiatt, Middle Lypiatt, Middle Spring, Minchinhampton, Miserden, Nailsworth, Oakridge, Oakridge Lynch, Old Neighbouring, Painswick, Painswick Beacon, Pitchcombe, Randwick, Ruscombe, (Note: includes GL6 6BU) Sheepscombe, Slad, Stancombe, The Camp, Upper Kitesnest, Westrip, Whiteshill, Whiteway | Stroud, Cotswold |
| GL7 | CIRENCESTER | Ampney Crucis, Ampney Knowle, Ampney St Mary, Ampney St Peter, Bagendon, Barnsley, Baunton, Bibury, Calmsden, Cerney Wick, Coates, Coln St. Aldwyns, Daglingworth, Bisley-with-Lypiatt, Down Ampney, Driffield, Duntisbourne Abbots, Duntisbourne Leer, Duntisbourne Rouse, Eastleach, Ewen, Harnhill, Hatherop, Honeycombe Leaze, Kemble, Kemble Wick, Love Lane Industrial Estate, Lower Norcote, Marsden, Meysey Hampton, Middle Duntisbourne, Norcote, North Cerney, North Cerney Downs, Perrotts Brook, Poole Keynes, Poulton, Preston, Quenington, Rapsgate, Ready Token, Rendcomb, Rodmarton, Sapperton, Shorncote, Siddington, Somerford Keynes, South Cerney, Stratton, Tarlton, (Note: includes GL7 6FH) Tunley, Upper Up, Whiteway, Winson, Winstone, Woodmancote | Cotswold, Stroud, Wiltshire |
| GL7 | FAIRFORD | Dudgrove, Dunfield, Kempsford, Totterdown, Whelford | Cotswold |
| GL7 | LECHLADE | Broadwell, Claydon, Claydon Pike, Downington, Filkins, Fyfield, Kelmscott, Kencot, Langford, Little Faringdon, Little London, Southrop, Thornhill, Warrens Cross | Cotswold, West Oxfordshire, Vale of White Horse |
| GL8 | TETBURY | Ashley, Avening, Babdown, Bagpath, Beverston, Calcot, Chavenage, Cherington, Culkerton, Doughton, Estcourt, Ilsom, Kingscote, Knockdown, (Note: includes GL8 8QY) Lasborough, Leighterton, Little Larkhill, Long Furlong, Long Newnton, Newington, Shipton Moyne, Trull, Tetbury Upton, Upton, Westonbirt, Willesley | Cotswold, Stroud, Wiltshire |
| GL9 | BADMINTON | Acton Turville, Didmarton, Dunkirk, Hawkesbury, Hawkesbury Common, Hawkesbury Upton, Inglestone Common, Little Badminton, Petty France, Tormarton | South Gloucestershire, Cotswold, Stroud, Wiltshire |
| GL10 | STONEHOUSE | Bridgend, Colethrop, Eastington, Frocester, Haresfield, Kings Stanley, Leonard Stanley, Lower Mills, Nastend, Newtown, Nupend, Nympsfield, Oldends, Oxlynch, Ryeford, Standish, Standish Park, Stanley Downton, Stroudwater Business Park, Westend | Stroud |
| GL11 | DURSLEY | Ashmead Green, Bull Pitch, Cam, Coaley, Norman Hill, North Nibley, Owlpen, Sandpits, Stancombe, Stinchcombe, Tilsdown, Uley, Upper Wick, Wick, (Note: includes GL11 6DA) Woodfield, Woodmancote | Stroud |
| GL11 | WOTTON-UNDER-EDGE | | non-geographic |
| GL12 | WOTTON-UNDER-EDGE | Alderley, Bagstone, Bibstone, Bournstream, Bowcott, Bradley Green, Buckover, Charfield, Coombe, Cromhall, Cutts Heath, Damery, Falfield, Hall End, Heathend, Hillesley, Howley, Huntingford, Kingswood, Leyhill, Michaelwood, Milbury Heath, Old Town, Ozleworth, Southend, Swinhay, Synwell, Tabernacle Pitch, Tortworth, Tresham, Tytherington, Whitfield, Wickwar, Woodend, Wortley | Stroud, South Gloucestershire, Cotswold |
| GL13 | BERKELEY | Abwell, Alkington, Berkeley Heath, Berrycroft, Bevington, Blackhall, Breadstone, Clapton, Hainses, Halmore, Ham, Ham Green, Hamfields, Hill, Hinton, Hystfield, Lower Stone, Mobley New Brookend, Newport, Newtown, Old Brookend, Pitbrook, Purton, Rockhampton, Sharpness, Stone, Wanswell, Woodford | Stroud, South Gloucestershire |
| GL14 | CINDERFORD | Buckshaft, Denecroft, Forest Vale Industrial Estate, Hawkwell Green, Littledean, Lower Soudley, Ruspidge, Soudley, Trafalgar, Upper Soudley, Whimsey | Forest of Dean |
| GL14 | NEWNHAM | Awre, Blaize Bailey, Broadoak, Bullo Pill, Elton, Flaxley, Pope's Hill, Ruddle | Forest of Dean |
| GL14 | WESTBURY-ON-SEVERN | Adsett, Bollow, Chaxhill, Grange Court, Ley, Northwood Green, Rodley, Walmore Common, Wintles Hill | Forest of Dean |
| GL15 | LYDNEY | Allastone, (Note: includes GL15 4EY) Alvington, Aylburton, Bream, Hewelsfield, Lower Meend, Lower Yorkley, Netherend, Oldcroft, Parkend, Pillowell, St. Briavels, Viney Hill, Viney Woodside, Whitecroft, Woolaston, Yorkley, Yorkley Slade | Forest of Dean |
| GL15 | BLAKENEY | Blakeney Hill, Bradley Hill, Etloe, Upper Etloe | Forest of Dean |
| GL16 | COLEFORD | Bakers Hill, (Note: includes GL16 7QB) Berry Hill, Broadwell, Cannop, (Note: includes GL16 7EH) Christchurch, Clearwell, Coalway, Edge End, Ellwood, English Bicknor, Five Acres, (Note: includes GL16 7QL) Gorsty Knoll, Hillersland, (Note: includes GL16 7NX) Joyford, Joyford Hill, (Note: includes GL16 7NX) Little Drybrook, (Note: includes GL16 8LP) Lower Berry Hill, (Note: includes GL16 8QG) Lower Milkwall, (Note: includes GL16 7LF) Mile End, Milkwall, Mushet Industrial Park, Newland, Ready Penny, (Note: includes GL16 7NX) Shortstanding, Sling, Speech House, Staunton, Symonds Yat Rock, Tufthorn | Forest of Dean, Monmouthshire |
| GL17 | LYDBROOK | Central Lydbrook, Joys Green, Lower Lydbrook, Upper Lydbrook, Worrall Hill | Forest of Dean, Herefordshire |
| GL17 | RUARDEAN | Ruardean Woodside, The Pludds | Forest of Dean, Herefordshire |
| GL17 | DRYBROOK | Brierley, Harrow Hill, Ruardean Hill | Forest of Dean, Herefordshire |
| GL17 | MITCHELDEAN | Lower Shapridge, Plump Hill, Wigpool | Forest of Dean, Herefordshire |
| GL17 | LONGHOPE | Blaisdon, Little London, May Hill | Forest of Dean, Herefordshire |
| GL18 | NEWENT | Castle Tump, Cliffords Mesne, Four Oaks, Great Boulsdon, Highleadon, Hillend Green, Kilcot, Lower Boulsdon, Malswick, Oxenhall, Pool Hill, Upleadon | Forest of Dean, Herefordshire |
| GL18 | DYMOCK | Broomsgreen, Greenway, Hallwood Green, Kempley, Ketford, Knights Green, Leddington, Ryton, Tillers Green | Forest of Dean, Herefordshire |
| GL19 | GLOUCESTER | Apperley, Ashleworth, Birdwood, Chaceley, Coombe Hill, Corse, Corse Lawn, Deerhurst, Deerhurst Walton, Eldersfield, Forthampton, Hartpury, Hasfield, Huntley, Lower Apperley, Pendock, Redmarley, Staunton, Taynton, The Leigh, (Note: includes GL19 4AA) Tibberton (west), Tirley, Walton Hill | Forest of Dean, Tewkesbury, Malvern Hills |
| GL20 | TEWKESBURY | Alderton, Alstone, Alstone Fields, Ashchurch, Aston Cross, Aston-on-Carrant, Back of Avon, Beckford, Bredon, Bredons Hardwick, Bredons Norton, Bushley, Claydon, Conderton, Fiddington, Grafton, Great Washbourne, Homedowns, Kemerton, Kinsham, Little Washbourne, Longdon, Natton Northway, Overbury, Pamington, Ripple, Shuthonger, Teddington, Tewkesbury Business Park, Tredington, Twyning, Uckinghall, Walton Cardiff, Westmancote | Tewkesbury, Malvern Hills, Wychavon |
| GL50 | CHELTENHAM | Montpellier, Lansdown, St. Pauls | Cheltenham, Gloucestershire |
| GL51 | CHELTENHAM | Badgeworth, Bamfurlong, Bentham, (Note: includes GL51 4TZ) Boddington, Cheltenham Trade Park, Elmstone Hardwicke, Gloucestershire Airport, Hayden, (Note: includes GL51 0FJ) Kingsditch Trading Estate, Knightsbridge, Leckhampton, Little Shurdington, (Note: includes GL51 4AF) Shurdington, St. Marks, (Note: includes GL51 7AH) Staverton, Staverton Technology Park, Swindon Village, The Reddings, (Note: includes GL51 6DR) Uckington, Up Hatherley, Warden Hill | Cheltenham, Gloucestershire |
| GL52 | CHELTENHAM | Prestbury, Battledown, Bishops Cleeve, Charlton Kings, Cleeve Hill, Gotherington, Oxenton, Prestbury, Southam, Stoke Orchard, Woodmancote, Woodmancote Park | Cheltenham, Tewkesbury |
| GL53 | CHELTENHAM | Caudle Green, (Note: includes GL53 9PR) Charlton Kings, Coberley, Coberley Village, Colesbourne, Cowley, Elkstone, Leckhampton, Leckhampton Hill, Seven Springs, Syde, Ullenwood, Upper Coberley | Cheltenham, Cotswold, Gloucestershire |
| GL54 | CHELTENHAM | Aldsworth, Andoversford, Bourton-on-the-Water, Brockhampton, Calcot, Charlton Abbotts, Charlton Kings, Chedworth, Clapton, Cold Aston, Coln Rogers, Coln St. Dennis, Compton Abdale, Condicote, Cutsdean, Didbrook, Eastington, Farmington, Fossebridge, Great Rissington, Greet, (Note: includes GL54 5BG) Gretton, Guiting Power, Hailes, Hampnett, Hawling, Hazleton, Icomb, Little Rissington, Lower Chedworth, (Note: includes GL54 4AN) Lower Coscombe, Lower Dowdeswell, Lower Slaughter, Lower Swell, Maugersbury, Middle Chedworth, (Note: includes GL54 4AJ) Naunton, Northleach, Notgrove, Old Hinchwick, (Note: includes GL54 1EU) Salperton, Sevenhampton, Sherborne, Shipton Oliffe, Stanley Pontlarge, Stanway, Stow on the Wold, Temple Guiting, Toddington, Turkdean, Upper Dowdeswell, Upper Rissington, Upper Slaughter, Upper Swell, Whittington, Winchcombe, Withington, Wood Stanway, Wyck Rissington, Yanworth | Cotswold, Gloucestershire, Cheltenham |
| GL55 | CHIPPING CAMPDEN | Aston Sub Edge, Broad Campden, Burnt Norton, (Note: includes GL55 6PR) Charingworth, (Note: includes GL55 6NR) Ebrington, Hidcote Bartrim, Hidcote Boyce, (Note: includes GL55 6LT) Mickleton, Paxford, Weston-Subedge | Cotswold, Stratford-on-Avon |
| GL56 | MORETON-IN-MARSH | Adlestrop, Aston Magna, Barton-on-the-Heath, Batsford, Blockley, Bourton on the Hill, Broadwell, Chastleton, Daylesford, Donnington, Dorn, Draycott, Evenlode, Little Compton, (Note: includes GL56 0SF) Longborough, Lower Lemington, Oddington, Old Town, Sezincote, Snowshill Hill, (Note: includes GL56 9TH) Springhill, (Note: includes GL56 9TW) Stretton-on-Fosse, Todenham, Upper Oddington | Cotswold, Stratford-on-Avon, West Oxfordshire, Gloucestershire |

== Map ==
GL postcode area map, showing postcode districts in red and post towns in grey text, with links to nearby BS, CV, HR, NP, OX, SN and WR postcode areas.

== See also ==
- Postcode Address File
- List of postcode areas in the United Kingdom
