= Bamfurlong =

Bamfurlong may refer to:

- Bamfurlong, Gloucestershire, a village in Gloucestershire, England
- Bamfurlong, Greater Manchester, a village in the Metropolitan Borough of Wigan, Greater Manchester, England
- Bamfurlong (Middle-earth), a fictional place in the books of J. R. R. Tolkien
