= Balls Green =

Balls Green may refer to:

- Ball's Green, a village in Gloucester, UK
- Balls green, a village in West Chiltington parish

== See also ==
- Media related to Balls Green at Wikimedia Commons
