= Bradley, Gloucestershire =

Village in Gloucestershire, England

Coordinates: 51.641102°N 2.366023°W

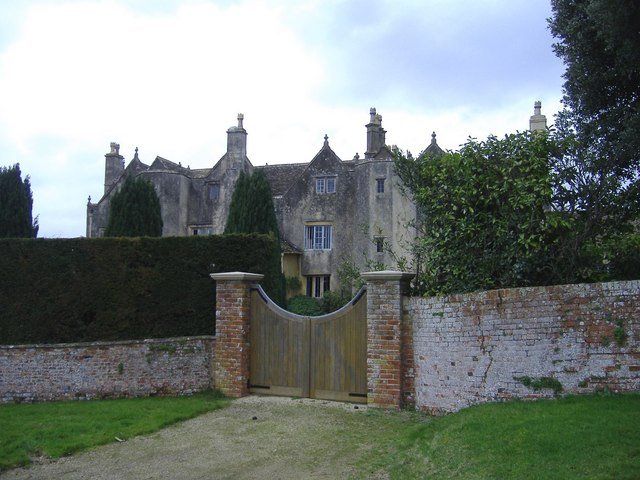
Bradley Court

Bradley is a small village in the Stroud District, in the county of Gloucestershire, England.

Also part of the village is the hamlet of Bradley Green, with its eponymous area of common land, still used for agriculture today. Buildings of note include the Grade II listed Bradley Court, once owned by the Berkeleys of Berkeley Castle and various former weavers' cottages which front on to Bradley Green itself. Within sight are Swinhay House, Wotton Hill and the Tyndale Monument. Nearby settlements include the town of Wotton-under-Edge, the villages of Kingswood, North Nibley and Charfield, and the hamlets of Howley, Southend and Bournstream.

For transport there is the B4060 road, the B4062 road, the B4058 road and the M5 motorway nearby.
