= Preston, Cotswold =

Village in Gloucestershire, England

Coordinates: 51.71515°N 1.93287°W

Preston
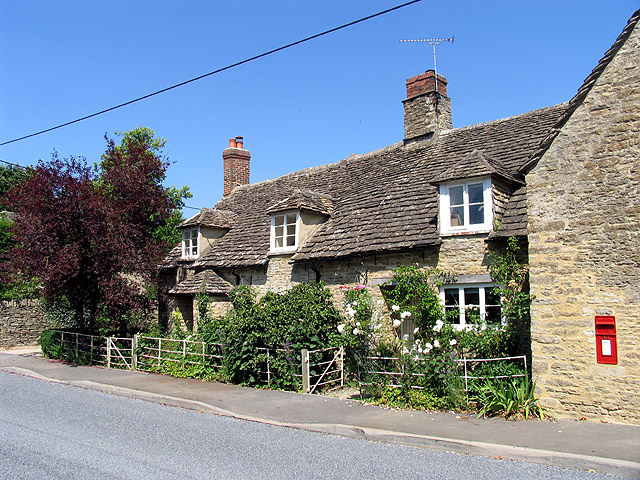

- Location within Gloucestershire
- Population: 327 (2011)
- District: Cotswold
- Shire county: Gloucestershire
- Region: South West
- Country: England
- Sovereign state: United Kingdom
- Post town: Cirencester
- Postcode district: GL7
- Police: Gloucestershire
- Fire: Gloucestershire
- Ambulance: South Western
- UK Parliament: South Cotswolds

Preston is a village and civil parish in Gloucestershire, England, situated 2.2 km south-east of the town of Cirencester. It is administered by the Cotswold District of Gloucestershire. The population of the civil parish at the 2011 Census was 327. Preston was mentioned in the Domesday Book (1086) as Prestetune.

== Description ==
Preston is a small village, which for much of its existence has lied 1.5 miles east of Circencester between the A417 to Fairford and the A419 to Swindon. In recent years, however, the village has extended south

In 2011 the Census recorded 327 inhabitants in the civil parish. The 2021 Census data for the Parish is not yet available but the population in the Cotswolds District as a whole has increased by 9.6% in the 10 years between 2011 and 2021.

For much of history, the community was largely agricultural, and features a Village Hall which is central to its community, and often hosts events/gatherings.
