= Salperton =

Coordinates: 51°53′06″N 1°53′24″W

- Village
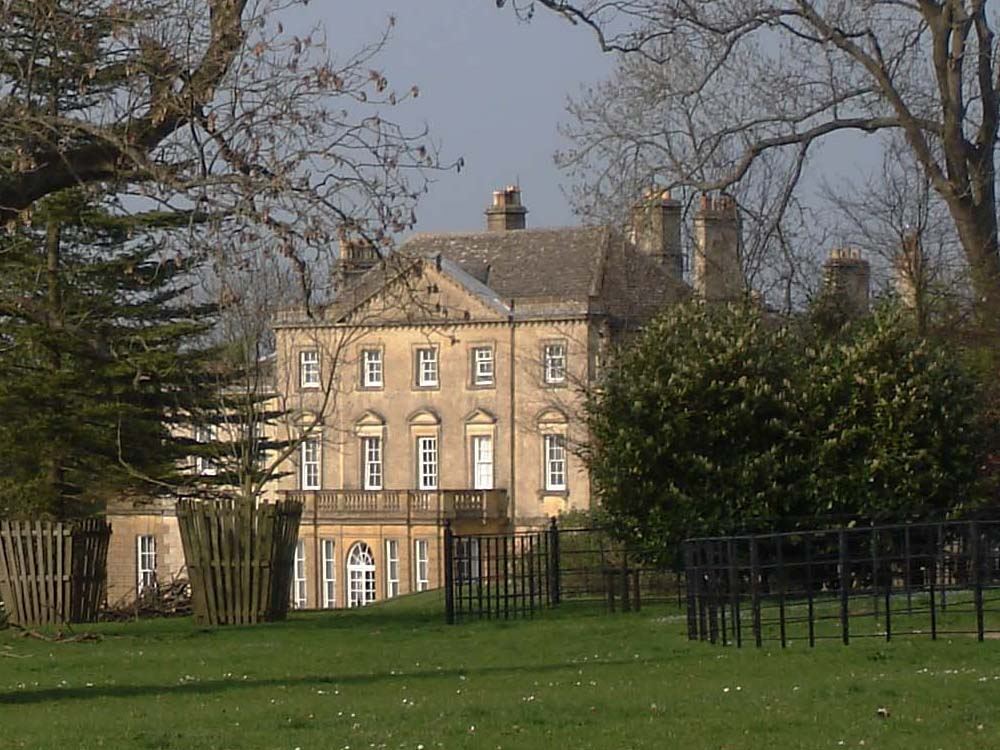
- Salperton Park house

- Location within Gloucestershire
- OS grid reference: SP0719
- Civil parish: Hazleton
- District: Cotswold
- Shire county: Gloucestershire
- Region: South West
- Country: England
- Sovereign state: United Kingdom
- Post town: Cheltenham
- Postcode district: GL54
- Police: Gloucestershire
- Fire: Gloucestershire
- Ambulance: South Western
- UK Parliament: North Cotswolds

Salperton is a village and former civil parish, now in the parish of Hazleton, in the Cotswolds about 8 miles (13 km) east of Cheltenham in Gloucestershire, England. It is also known as Cold Salperton, owing to its exposed position. In 1931 the parish had a population of 92.

== History ==
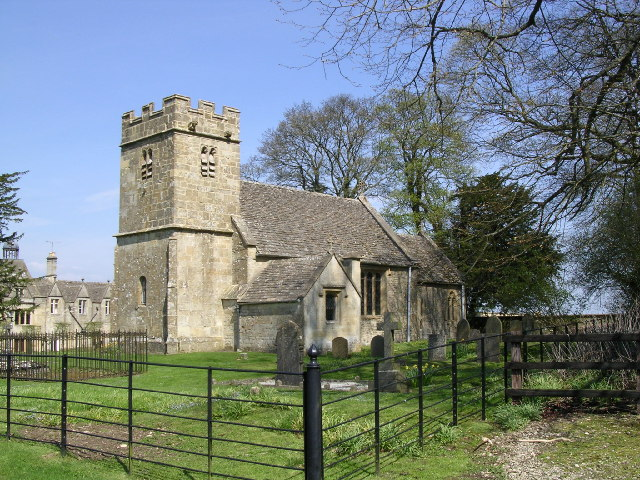
All Saints Church

The Church of England parish church of All Saints is Norman, with some Early English Gothic windows and a Perpendicular Gothic porch. Situated to the south of the village, it is a Grade II* listed building.

Most of the houses date from the 17th and 18th centuries. The Old Bell Inn is Georgian, with a date-stone of 1752.

Salperton Park is a country estate. Its country house in the Palladian Style dates to c. 1760–1770, with wings designed by Richard Pace added in 1817.

The war memorial is different from most, consisting of a stone base, topped by a wooden crucifix, also known as a "hooded calvary". The memorial honours those from the village who lost their lives in WW1 (20 named) & two from WW2. Most of the WW1 casualties died on the Western Front, but two naval officers, Commander Arthur Silvertop, RN aged 38, & Lt. Commander the Hon. Hugh Feilding, RN aged 28, were serving on HMS Defence sunk in the battle of Jutland on 31 May 1916.

The front panel carries the following inscription:

In proud and glorious memory of 2nd. Lieut. James Collier Foster Harter, Sherwood Rangers Yeomanry, elder son of George Loyd Foster and Frances Geraldine Harter nee Coke of Salperton Park, who died of wounds about 28 November 1917, 13 miles from Jerusalem essaying to deliver the Holy Land from the Infidels (for which an ancestor of his had also fought 1247 – 1260) and is buried at Suffa in Palestine aged 28.
Also of their son-in-law Lieut. Francis Somerled Joseph Silvertop, Oxfordshire Yeomanry of Minster Acres, Northumberland, killed in action at Cuillemont Farm 20 May 1917 aged 23 and is buried at St. Emelie and Jesus looking on him loved him.

On 1 April 1935 the parish was abolished and merged with Haselton.

== Sources ==
- Davidson Cragoe, Carol; Jurica, A.R.J.; Williamson, Elizabeth (2001). N.M. Herbert (ed.). Victoria County History: A History of the County of Gloucester, Volume 9. pp. 155–166.
- Verey, David; Brooks, Alan (1999). The Buildings of England: Gloucestershire 1: The Cotswolds. Harmondsworth: Penguin Books. pp. 587–589.
