= Sunhill =

Hamlet in Gloucestershire, England

Coordinates: 51.72200°N 1.83202°W

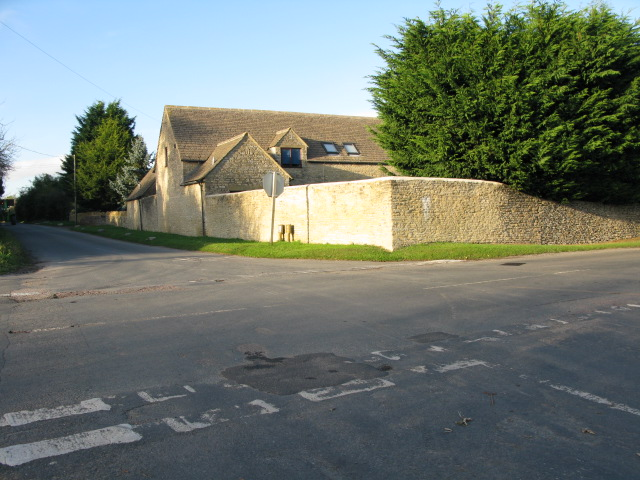
- Road junction at Sunhill

- Location within Gloucestershire
- District: Cotswold
- Shire county: Gloucestershire
- Region: South West
- Country: England
- Sovereign state: United Kingdom
- Post town: Cirencester
- Postcode district: GL7
- Police: Gloucestershire
- Fire: Gloucestershire
- Ambulance: South Western
- UK Parliament: South Cotswolds

Sunhill is a hamlet at the junction of a five-ways crossroads in the English county of Gloucestershire.

== Overview ==
Sunhill is located on the ancient Welsh Way about a mile northeast of the village of Poulton and is surrounded by other villages such as the well known Bibury.

The main hamlet of Sunhill consists of three Cotswold stone houses, and a rendered bungalow. Of the houses, one is a barn conversion, adapted for living in approximately 1992. Another was much earlier converted from two farm-workers cottages into a single dwelling. The oldest buildings have been in place since the late 19th century. Slightly further afield, several other houses and barn conversions also form part of the hamlet.

Sunhill had a working quarry for many years, but this has been disused for over 40 years, and has now been levelled to return it to agricultural use.

Sunhill has a post box, which replaced a Georgian box built into the wall of a small barn on the corner of the crossroads, before the barn was torn down to allow for better road visibility at the junction.
