= Whiteshill, Stroud =

Village in Gloucestershire, England

Coordinates: 51.76147°N 2.23297°W

Whiteshill
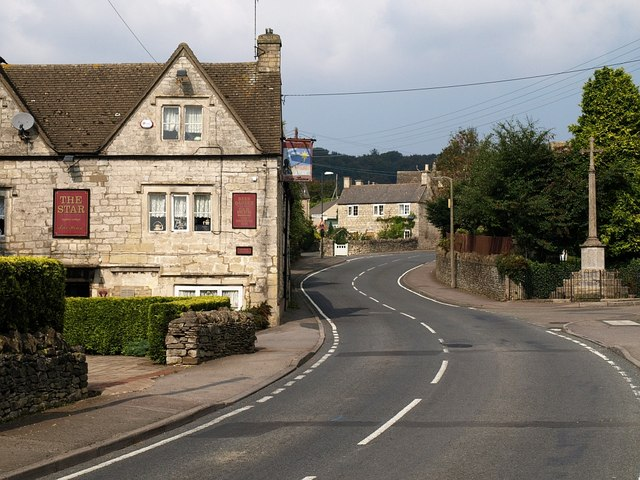
- The main road in Whiteshill

- Location within Gloucestershire
- Population: 1,161 (civil parish 2011)
- Civil parish: Whiteshill and Ruscombe
- District: Stroud
- Shire county: Gloucestershire
- Region: South West
- Country: England
- Sovereign state: United Kingdom
- Post town: Stroud
- Postcode district: GL6 6
- Dialling code: 01452
- Police: Gloucestershire
- Fire: Gloucestershire
- Ambulance: South Western
- UK Parliament: Stroud

Whiteshill is a village in the Cotswolds, situated between Stroud and Gloucester, in Gloucestershire, England and forms part of the Stroud urban area. The parish of Whiteshill and Ruscombe has a population of 1,175.

The Church of England Church is St. Paul's. When the limits of Stroud parish were set in 1304, Whiteshill and Ruscombe formed part of the tithing of Paganhill. They remained part of Stroud until 1894, when the new civil parish of Whiteshill was created.
