= Joys Green, Gloucestershire =

Village in Gloucestershire, England

Coordinates: 51.84558°N 2.57755°W

Joys Green
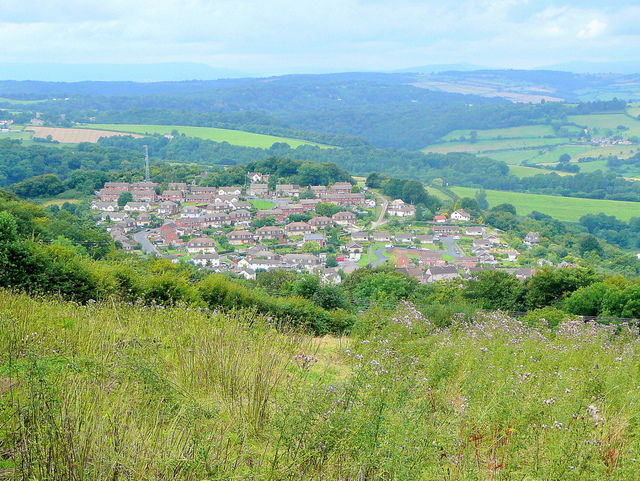
- View towards Joys Green

- Location within Gloucestershire
- OS grid reference: SO604164
- District: Forest of Dean
- Shire county: Gloucestershire
- Region: South West
- Country: England
- Sovereign state: United Kingdom
- Post town: LYDBROOK
- Postcode district: GL17
- Dialling code: 01594
- Police: Gloucestershire
- Fire: Gloucestershire
- Ambulance: South Western
- UK Parliament: Forest of Dean

Joy's Green is a village in the Forest of Dean in West Gloucestershire, England. The village is in the civil parish of the neighbouring village of Lydbrook.

== About Joys Green ==
The village of Joys Green which is still part of the Parish of Lydbrook now currently has no Village Shop or Post Office.

The Primary School was built in 1883 to the designs of the architect Alfred Smith but this closed in late 2008 to become a young peoples directorate, leaving all of the students there (at most 15 children) to transfer to the other local primary school in Lydbrook.

The village still has its own playground with play equipment on and a small football pitch, this is currently situated where Joys Green Football Club pitch used to be. The Joys Green community centre is also still situated within the old primary school grounds and meetings regarding the local area are often either held there or at the Lydbrook Memorial Hall.

Recently Two Rivers Housing has invested in nearly five or six new properties and renovated a lot of properties within the area. As well as the new houses Joys Green is still home to the Edwards Close housing estate which was named after Edwards Coaches which were formerly based there and in Lydbrook.

The village shop, when it used to be open once ran an initiative to stop littering around the village which attracted the attention of BBC Points West, BBC National News and BBC Newsround. This was all aired in late 2008.
