= Tibberton, Gloucestershire =

Village in Gloucestershire, England

Coordinates: 51.8950°N 2.3470°W

Tibberton
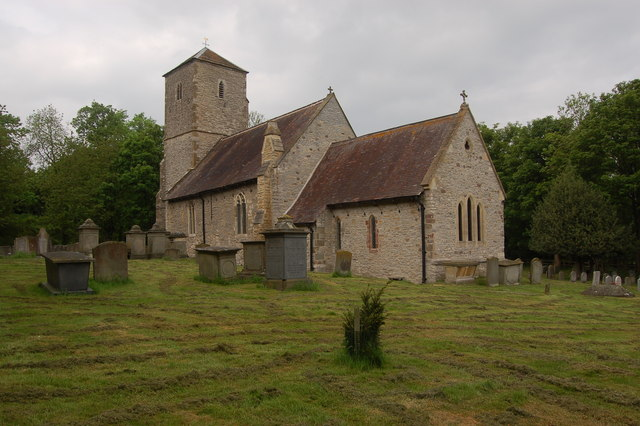
- Holy Trinity Church, Tibberton

- Location within Gloucestershire
- Population: 576 (2021 census)
- OS grid reference: SO762218
- Civil parish: Tibberton
- District: Forest of Dean
- Shire county: Gloucestershire
- Region: South West
- Country: England
- Sovereign state: United Kingdom
- Post town: GLOUCESTER
- Postcode district: GL2, GL19
- Dialling code: 01452
- Police: Gloucestershire
- Fire: Gloucestershire
- Ambulance: South Western
- UK Parliament: Forest of Dean

Tibberton is a village and civil parish in the Forest of Dean District of Gloucestershire, England. The village is 5 miles (8 km) north-west of Gloucester and 5 miles (8 km) south-east of Newent. At the 2021 census, the population of the output areas roughly equating to the civil parish was 576. Tibberton is a parish of 1,406 acres (5.69 km^{2}) in an area with 254 households. The population of the central village area within the parish was estimated at 345 people by Forest of Dean District Council in July 2024.

The local primary school, Tibberton Community Primary School, provides education for children from 2–11. It is a half form entry school with 109 primary school pupils as of January 2024, roughly 35 nursery school pupils, and is currently rated "Good" by Ofsted as of May 2023.

== Governance ==
Tibberton lies within the Longhope & Huntley electoral ward administered by the Forest of Dean District Council.
