= Draycott, Gloucestershire =

Coordinates: 52°1′10″N 1°44′20″W

Draycott
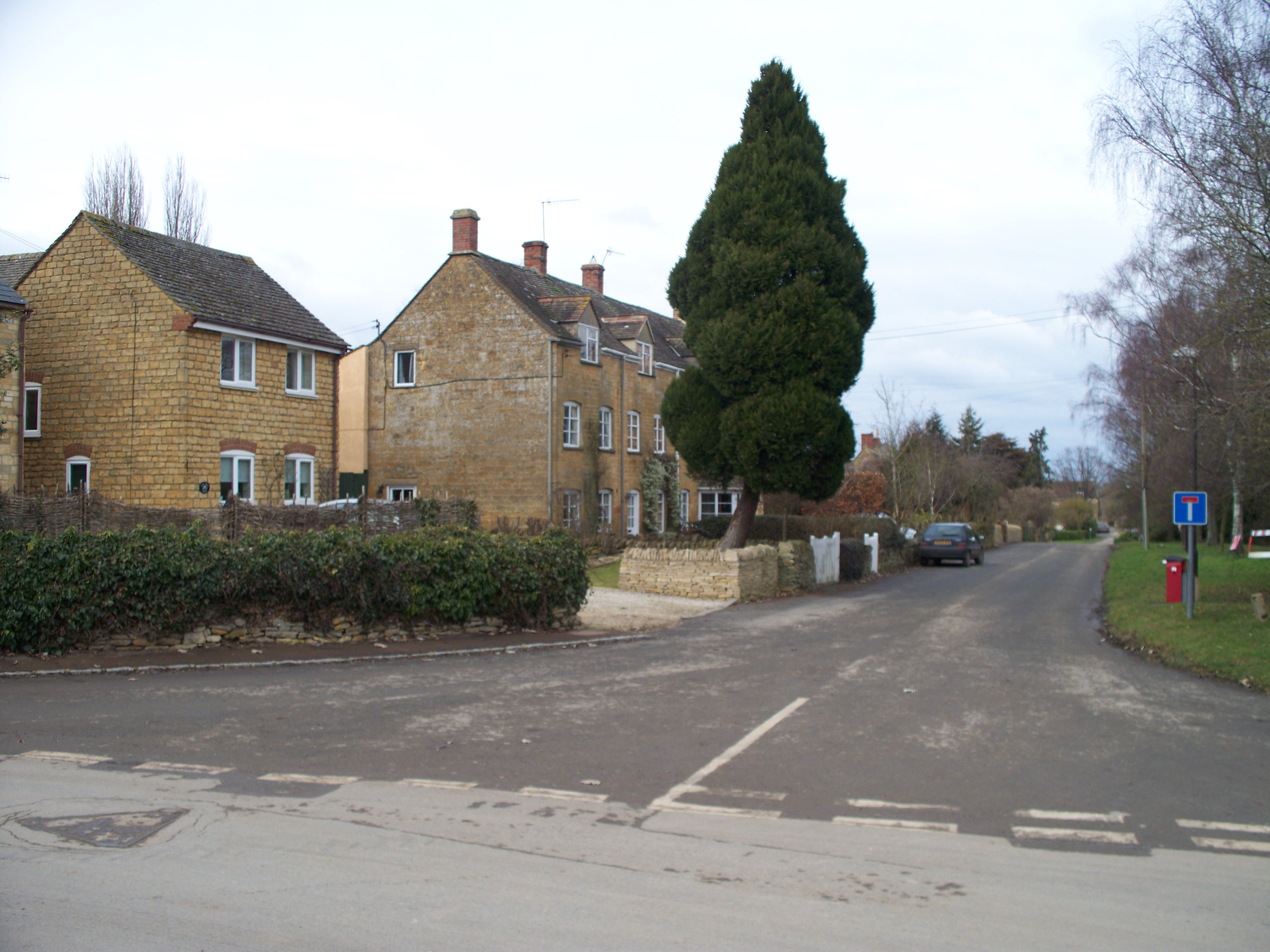

- Location within Gloucestershire
- OS grid reference: SP181357
- Civil parish: Blockley
- District: Cotswold
- Shire county: Gloucestershire
- Region: South West
- Country: England
- Sovereign state: United Kingdom
- Post town: Moreton-in-Marsh
- Postcode district: GL56
- Police: Gloucestershire
- Fire: Gloucestershire
- Ambulance: South Western
- UK Parliament: North Cotswolds

Draycott is a small hamlet in north Gloucestershire between Moreton-in-Marsh and Blockley, within Blockley civil parish. It is not mentioned in Domesday Book but was in existence by 1182. Draycott has a green and each summer a barbecue is held there for the locals.
