= Staunton (near Gloucester) =

Village in Gloucestershire, England

Coordinates: 51.9625°N 2.3038°W

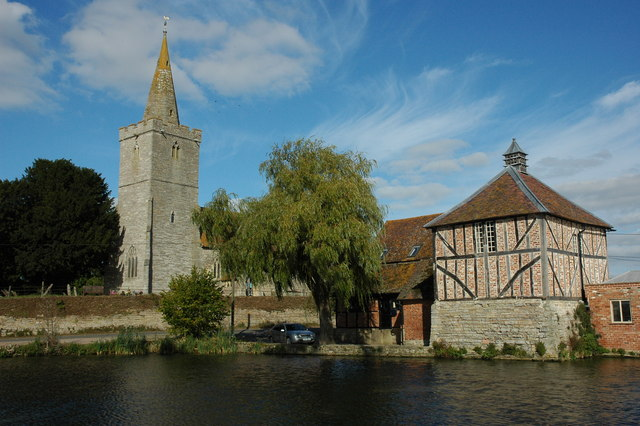

- Location within Gloucestershire
- OS grid reference: SO791293
- Civil parish: Staunton
- District: Forest of Dean
- Shire county: Gloucestershire
- Region: South West
- Country: England
- Sovereign state: United Kingdom
- Post town: Gloucester
- Postcode district: GL19
- Police: Gloucestershire
- Fire: Gloucestershire
- Ambulance: South Western
- UK Parliament: Forest of Dean

Staunton is a village that lies close to the village of Corse. Staunton is eight miles north of the city of Gloucester. To the south-west of Staunton is the River Leadon. It is on the A417 road.

== History ==
Staunton used to lie in the county of Worcestershire. Originally Staunton was included in the "forest of Corse", the woodland in 1086 being a league long and half a league in breadth. In 1347, Robert de Staunton as lord of the manor, obtained a grant of a Wednesday market at Staunton and a fair for four days at the feast of St James, but by the 17th century the earlier prosperity of Staunton had disappeared. At the end of the 18th century cider and perry were produced in large quantities at Staunton, but because the soil produced good crops of wheat, beans and barley, the cidermaking industry died out.

The church of Saint James was originally a 12th-century church with short rectangular chancel and aisleless nave, the chancel afterwards being rebuilt and the tower and aisle added in later years. The nave windows are all of 14th-century type, apparently copies or restorations of work of that period, and the tower and spire are of late 14th-century date with a later west window. The church was heavily restored in 1860, when the chancel was rebuilt and the vestry added.

Staunton Court stands immediately to the east of the church and is a picturesque brick and timber building with hipped red-tiled roofs, dating probably from the latter half of the 16th century.

Staunton has been a civil parish since 1894. In 1931 the village was transferred from Worcestershire to Gloucestershire.
