= Northway, Gloucestershire =

Village in Gloucestershire, England

Coordinates: 52.003°N 02.116°W

Northway
- Location within Gloucestershire
- OS grid reference: SO9234
- Civil parish: Northway
- District: Tewkesbury
- Shire county: Gloucestershire
- Region: South West
- Country: England
- Sovereign state: United Kingdom
- Post town: Tewkesbury
- Postcode district: GL20
- Dialling code: 01684
- Police: Gloucestershire
- Fire: Gloucestershire
- Ambulance: South Western
- UK Parliament: Tewkesbury

Northway is a village and civil parish in Gloucestershire, England, 2 miles north-east of Tewkesbury, and is in effect a suburb of that town. The parish is bordered on the west side by the M5 motorway, on the east by the Birmingham to Bristol main railway line, on the south by the A46 road and on the north by the boundary with Worcestershire.

== History ==
The toponym was first recorded in the 12th century in the form Northihaia, derived from the Old English north and gehæg, meaning "northern enclosure". Northway was granted to Tewkesbury Abbey in 1107, and in the Middle Ages Northway was part of the parish of Tewkesbury, but after the dissolution of the monasteries in the 16th century became part of the parish of Ashchurch.

Until the 20th century Northway remained a small hamlet. During the Second World War the Dowty Group established a factory in old railway buildings at Northway, and after the war a large housing estate was built north of the works on the site of a war-time camp. More development took place during the 1960s. The residential area lies south-west of the original hamlet. An area of pre-fabricated houses still exists in the estate, although heavily modified and modernised. Additions to the earliest developments have progressed right up to the present day. One newer development, commonly referred to as 'Saxon Park', built upon the former site of a factory that was once a part of Dowty Seals, sparked much controversy as many homes were significantly damaged in the Summer Floods of 2007 despite being less than a year old. Other areas of the parish were hit particularly badly, e.g. Kestrel Way and Sallis Close.

In 2008 Northway became a separate civil parish.
