= Syde =

Village in Gloucestershire, England

Coordinates: 51.796°N 2.075°W

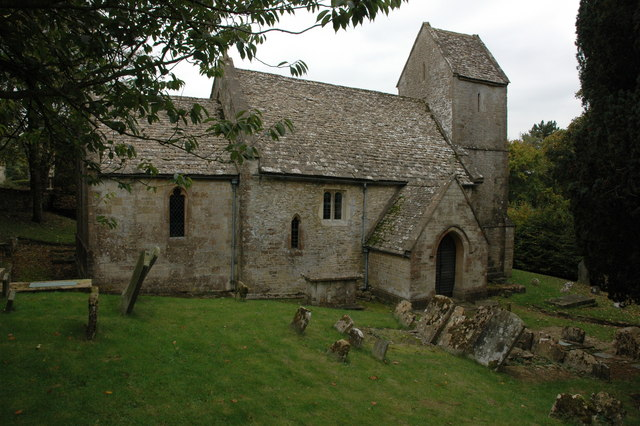
- Syde Church

- Location within Gloucestershire
- District: Cotswold
- Shire county: Gloucestershire
- Region: South West
- Country: England
- Sovereign state: United Kingdom
- Post town: CHELTENHAM
- Postcode district: GL53
- Dialling code: 01242
- Police: Gloucestershire
- Fire: Gloucestershire
- Ambulance: South Western
- UK Parliament: North Cotswolds

Syde, often in the past spelt Side, is a small village and civil parish in Gloucestershire, England. It lies in the Cotswolds, near the source of the River Frome, some six miles north west of Cirencester and seven miles east of Painswick.

There is a Church of England parish church called St Mary's.

The principal house is Syde Manor, a listed building which dates from the 16th and 17th centuries, built of stone rubble with a Cotswold stone roof and gables. Some of its mullioned windows have unusual three-centred arches at their heads. The front of the house which has the main entrance was added in the late 18th or early 19th century.

== History ==
The National Gazetteer of Great Britain and Ireland (1868) says of Side (as it spelt the name):

SIDE, a parish in the hundred of Rapsgate, county Gloucester, 7 miles N.W. of Cirencester, its post town, and 7 E. of Painswick. The parish, which is of small extent, is situated near the Roman Ermine Street. The surface is hilly. The soil consists of stonebrash and gravel, with a rocky subsoil. There is no village. The living is a rectory in the diocese of Gloucester and Bristol, value £126. The church, dedicated to St. Mary, is a small stone edifice, with a tower and three bells. The parochial charities produce about £2 per annum. John Hall, Esq., is lord of the manor.

John Marius Wilson's Imperial Gazetteer of England and Wales (1870–1872) says:

SIDE, or Syde, a parish in Cirencester district, Gloucester; 7½ miles NW by N of Cirencester r. station. Post town, Winstone, under Cirencester. Acres, 614. Real property, £886. Pop., 55. Houses, 11. The manor belongs to J. Hall, Esq. The living is a rectory in the diocese of Gloucester and Bristol. Value, £126. Patron, J. Hall, Esq. The church is good.

== Governance ==
Because of its small population, Syde has a parish meeting, at which all electors can attend and vote, rather than a parish council. It forms part of the Ermin ward of Cotswold District, which together with Gloucestershire County Council provides all local government services.

The parish is part of the parliamentary constituency of North Cotswolds, represented in parliament by the Conservative Sir Geoffrey Clifton-Brown.
