= Ganborough =

Coordinates: 51°57′38.7″N 1°44′59″W

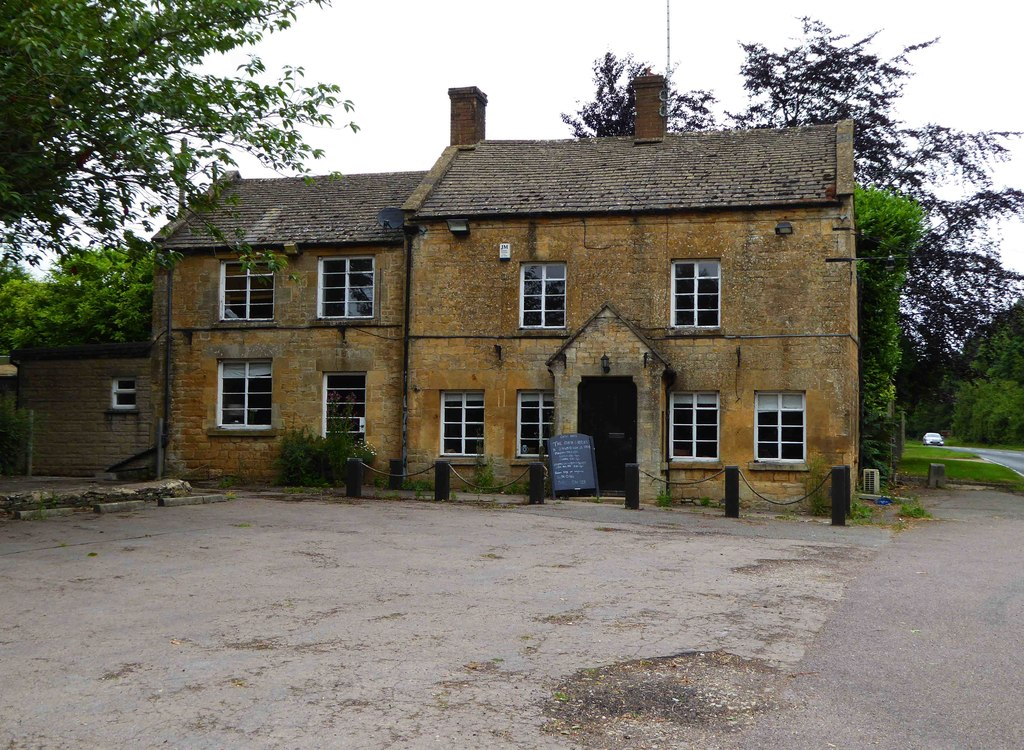
The former Coach & Horses, Ganborough

Ganborough is a hamlet located along the A424 road, approximately 2 miles NNW of Stow on the Wold.

Ganborough is located in Gloucestershire, a county in South-West England. It also lies in the Cotswold Hills, a designated Area of Outstanding Natural Beauty. Although its boundaries are uncertain, the hamlet includes the Coach and Horses public house, owned by the local Donnington Brewery, and the surrounding houses.

There is also a chambered tomb situated on a nearby hilltop.
