= Upper Rissington =

Village in Gloucestershire, England

Coordinates: 51.87640°N 1.70507°W

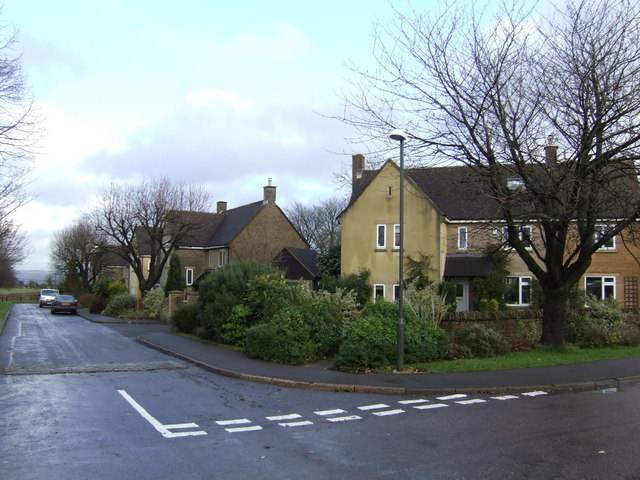
- Housing at Upper Rissington

- Location within Gloucestershire
- Population: 1,046 (2011 census)
- OS grid reference: SP204198
- Civil parish: Upper Rissington
- District: Cotswold
- Shire county: Gloucestershire
- Region: South West
- Country: England
- Sovereign state: United Kingdom
- Post town: Cheltenham
- Postcode district: GL54
- Dialling code: 01451
- Police: Gloucestershire
- Fire: Gloucestershire
- Ambulance: South Western
- UK Parliament: North Cotswolds

Upper Rissington is a village and civil parish in the Cotswold district of Gloucestershire, England. It is located about two-and-a-half miles east of Bourton-on-the-Water and is one of the highest villages in the Cotswolds at an elevation of 275 m.

It is a recent settlement, with much of its original housing built after 1945 as officers' quarters for the adjacent RAF Little Rissington, an active airfield. The housing was sold off by the Ministry of Defence in 1996, with further housing built since then. Several buildings of architectural interest, including the Station Headquarters and the Officers' Mess, have been retained and converted into housing. The street names give a clue to the village's former life, having names such as Spitfire Place, Sopwith Road and Avro Road. The village is enhanced by the large numbers of mature trees planted by the first Station Commander which are now all protected.

According to the Gloucestershire Mid-2004 Ward and Parish Population Estimates it had a population of 994. According to the Local Insight Profile it had a population of 1,040 in 2014 but this has since grown rapidly due to the new housing. The village is one of the youngest and most dynamic communities in the Cotswolds with 30% of the population under 18. Once known for its social life when it housed hundreds of young trainee pilots, the new village has well established community events such as the Easter Egg Hunt, Village Fete, and Fireworks night. The Breeze is the quarterly village newsletter which provides information on community events and village news.

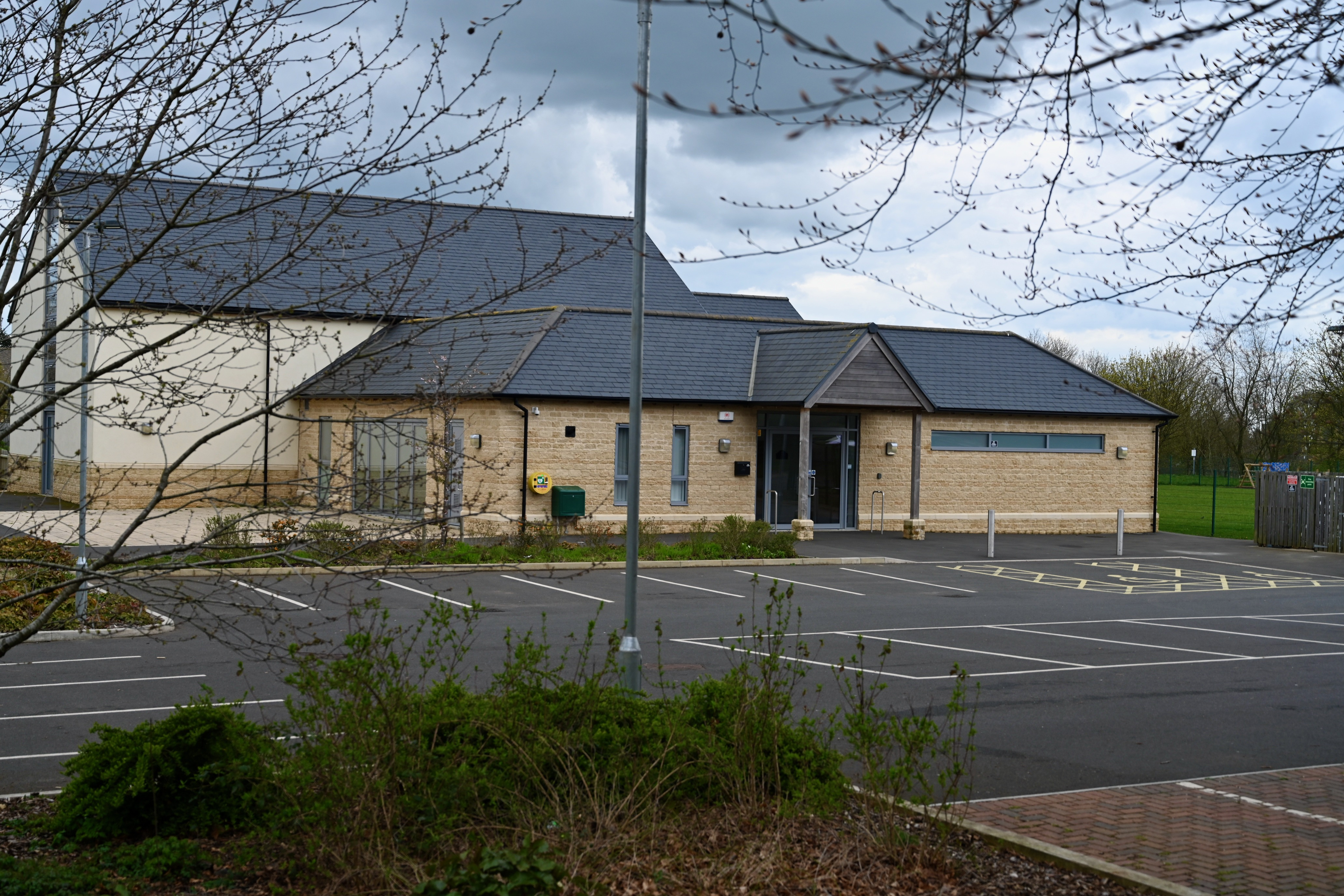
Upper Rissington Village Hall

== Local amenities ==
The Village Square, a small retail centre, opened in 2017. It includes a Co-op Food shop, Badham pharmacy, Runner Bean gym and a Barnado's charity shop. Dragon Vets opened in the former Co-op premises in 2019. There is also a primary school (The Rissington School), a village hall, 2 tennis courts, a bowling green, football pitches, a small skate park and allotments. There are many open green spaces around the village with paths for walking, running, cycling and dog walking, and children's playgrounds scattered around the village. The village is within the catchment of the Cotswold School, "the Comprehensive School of the Year 2015/16" according to the Sunday Times. The Cotswold Business Centre is located in the village, providing space to local businesses including a dance school.

== Governance ==
The village became a parish in 2020 and the Upper Rissington Parish Council was formed. The village is the most populous area of the 'Rissingtons' district council electoral ward. This ward starts in the south at Great Rissington and stretches north to Icomb. The total population taken at the 2011 census was 2,103. The village is in the Stow-on-the-Wold county council electoral division and is one of the three largest population centres, along with Stow and Moreton-in-Marsh.

== Climate ==
Climate data for Little Rissington, Elevation: 210 m (689 ft), 1991–2020 normals
Month	Jan	Feb	Mar	Apr	May	Jun	Jul	Aug	Sep	Oct	Nov	Dec	Year
Mean daily maximum °C (°F)	6.5 (43.7)	7.1 (44.8)	9.7 (49.5)	12.8 (55.0)	15.9 (60.6)	19.0 (66.2)	21.4 (70.5)	20.7 (69.3)	17.9 (64.2)	13.6 (56.5)	9.5 (49.1)	6.8 (44.2)	13.4 (56.1)
Daily mean °C (°F)	3.8 (38.8)	4.1 (39.4)	6.0 (42.8)	8.4 (47.1)	11.4 (52.5)	14.3 (57.7)	16.5 (61.7)	16.2 (61.2)	13.8 (56.8)	10.3 (50.5)	6.6 (43.9)	4.2 (39.6)	9.6 (49.3)
Mean daily minimum °C (°F)	1.1 (34.0)	1.1 (34.0)	2.3 (36.1)	4.0 (39.2)	6.8 (44.2)	9.7 (49.5)	11.7 (53.1)	11.8 (53.2)	9.7 (49.5)	7.0 (44.6)	3.8 (38.8)	1.5 (34.7)	5.9 (42.6)
Average precipitation mm (inches)	78.5 (3.09)	54.8 (2.16)	53.5 (2.11)	55.6 (2.19)	66.5 (2.62)	57.3 (2.26)	62.5 (2.46)	64.9 (2.56)	63.8 (2.51)	84.2 (3.31)	85.4 (3.36)	82.9 (3.26)	809.9 (31.89)
Average precipitation days (≥ 1.0 mm)	13.1	10.9	10.6	10.3	10.0	9.3	9.2	10.4	9.7	12.5	13.5	13.1	132.6
Source: Met Office
