= Battledown =

Coordinates: 51.88°N 02.05°W

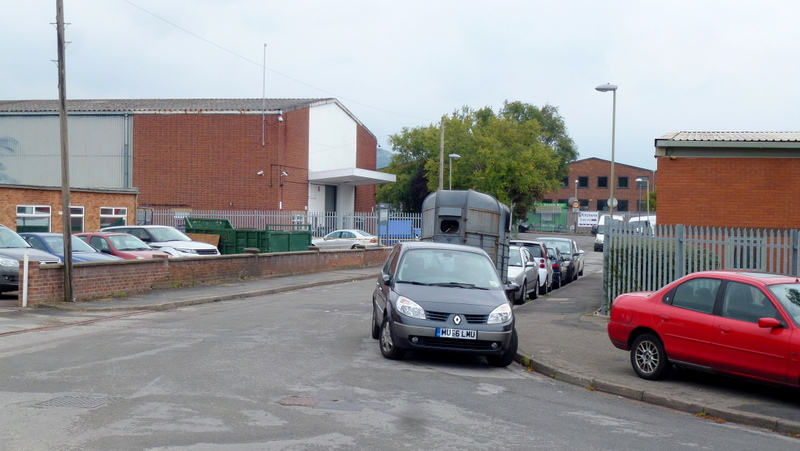
- Battledown Trading Estate

- Location within Gloucestershire
- Population: 5,460 (2011.Ward)
- OS grid reference: SO9621
- Shire county: Gloucestershire
- Region: South West
- Country: England
- Sovereign state: United Kingdom
- Post town: Cheltenham
- Postcode district: GL52 6
- Police: Gloucestershire
- Fire: Gloucestershire
- Ambulance: South Western

Battledown is a private residential estate in Cheltenham, Gloucestershire, England. In the 19th century a number of such private estates were established in the town; Battledown is the last to remain private, the rest having been merged into the wider town. Battledown is one of the richest parts of Cheltenham; the average house price is approximately £1 million.

In the 1960s Battledown Manor became a home for boys between the ages of 9 and 16. The head was a retired Royal Marines Captain, J B Ward, and the manor housed some 15 to 20 boys from across England. All of the boys were sent to local schools in Charlton Kings and Cheltenham.

== Trustees ==
Trustee	Responsibility
Anthony Thompson	Barriers
Anthony Thompson	Estate-owned Trees
David Chevins	Finance
Doug Gale	Infrastructure
Anthony Stranack	Property
Anthony Stranack	Website / General Enquiries
Elisa Jordan	Trustee
