= Broadwell, Forest of Dean =

Village in Gloucestershire, England

Coordinates: 51.7968°N 2.5988°W

Broadwell
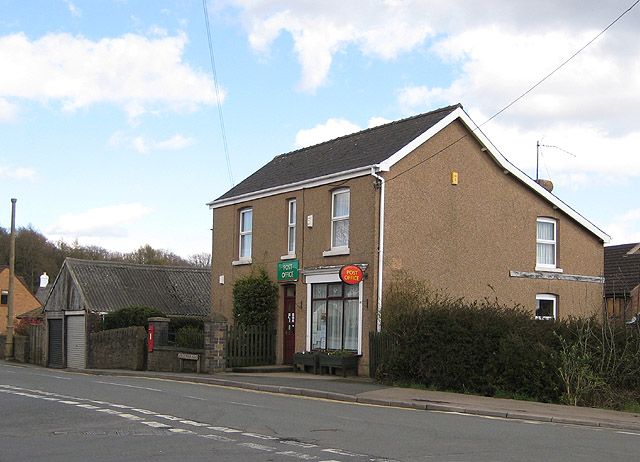
- Broadwell Post Office

- Location within Gloucestershire
- OS grid reference: SO588110
- Civil parish: Coleford
- District: Forest of Dean
- Shire county: Gloucestershire
- Ceremonial county: Gloucestershire
- Region: South West
- Country: England
- Sovereign state: United Kingdom
- Post town: Coleford
- Postcode district: GL16
- Dialling code: 01594
- Police: Gloucestershire
- Fire: Gloucestershire
- Ambulance: South Western

Broadwell is a village about 1 mile (1.6 km) east of Coleford, Gloucestershire, England. It is at the western edge of the Forest of Dean, in the civil parish of Coleford, which is also its post town. The village of Mile End is to the north and Coalway is to the south.

== History ==
Broadwell has had a long history of coal mining. In the late 16th century a miner acquired a lease of land bordering the royal Forest at Broadwell. A tramroad opened in 1812 to link mines in the Forest with Redbrook and Monmouth entered Coleford north of Broadwell. A mine, known in 1735 as Gentlemen Colliers, included a working pit at Littledean Lane End near Broadwell in 1835. Broadwell was also one of the scattered farmsteads on the east side of Coleford. Broadwell Farm, on the Forest boundary at the place once known as King's Broadwell, was recorded in 1789. There were three beerhouses at Broadwell in 1841. The British Land Society laid out new roads north of Broadwell Farm in 1859 and several houses had been built on them by the late 1870s. In 1886 a fife and drum band was based at Broadwell. Broadwell's memorial hall, built in 1921, housed a library in 1955. A social club next to the hall was enlarged after 1959. Broadwell also had a football ground by 1959.

Many of Broadwell's 20th-century houses were provided by West Dean Rural District Council, which between 1923 and 1934 built 44 east of the Five Acres road, and in 1948 filled the area to the south with prefabricated bungalows, most of which were replaced later in the century. Additional housing estates were added in the 1950s and 60s.

== Parish church ==
The Church of England parish church of the Good Shepherd is part of the Diocese of Gloucester.
