= Broadwell, Cotswold =

Village in Gloucestershire, England

Coordinates: 51.948°N 1.703°W

Broadwell
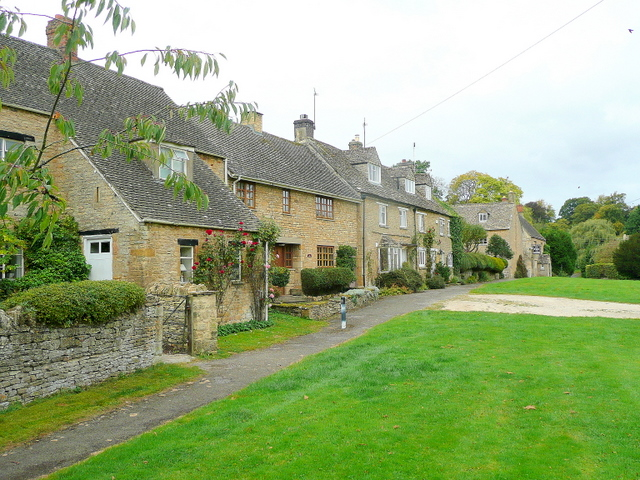
- Broadwell

- Location within Gloucestershire
- Population: 355 (2011 Census)
- OS grid reference: SP2027
- Civil parish: Broadwell
- District: Cotswold
- Shire county: Gloucestershire
- Ceremonial county: Gloucestershire
- Region: South West
- Country: England
- Sovereign state: United Kingdom
- Post town: Moreton-in-Marsh
- Postcode district: GL56
- Police: Gloucestershire
- Fire: Gloucestershire
- Ambulance: South Western
- UK Parliament: North Cotswolds
- Website: Broadwell Parish Council

Broadwell is a village and civil parish in the English county of Gloucestershire. It is about 1.5 miles (2.4 km) north of Stow-on-the-Wold, In the 2001 United Kingdom census, the parish had a population of 384. decreasing to 355 at the 2011 census.

== History ==
The 1086 Domesday Book records Broadwell as a property of Evesham Abbey.

The Church of England parish church of Saint Paul was built in the 12th and 13th centuries and restored in the 1860s.

The church and churchyard contain tombs of the Chadwell family who owned Broadwell Manor from the 16th century. The manor house later passed by inheritance to Mary Chamberlayne who rebuilt it after a fire in 1757. The present 18th century manor building and the church are both Grade II* listed.

== Governance ==
Broadwell is governed locally by a parish council. The civil parish is part of the ward of Fosseridge. As of 2025 the ward is represented on the Cotswold District Council by Conservative councillor David Cunningham.

Since 1992 the village has been represented in Parliament by Conservative MP Sir Geoffrey Clifton-Brown, first within the constituency of Cirencester and Tewkesbury until 1997, The Cotswolds until 2024, and then North Cotswolds. Prior to Brexit in 2020, the area was part of the South West England constituency of the European Parliament.

== Demography ==
At the 2001 UK census, the civil parish of Broadwell had a population of 384. The 2001 population density for the ward of Fosseridge was 0.29 per hectare, with a 100 to 88.6 female-to-male ratio. The proportion of residents who classified themselves as White was 99.2%, a figure higher than those for Cotswold (98.8%), the South West (97.7%) and England (90.9%).
