= Baunton =

Village in Gloucestershire, England

Coordinates: 51°44′N 1°58′W

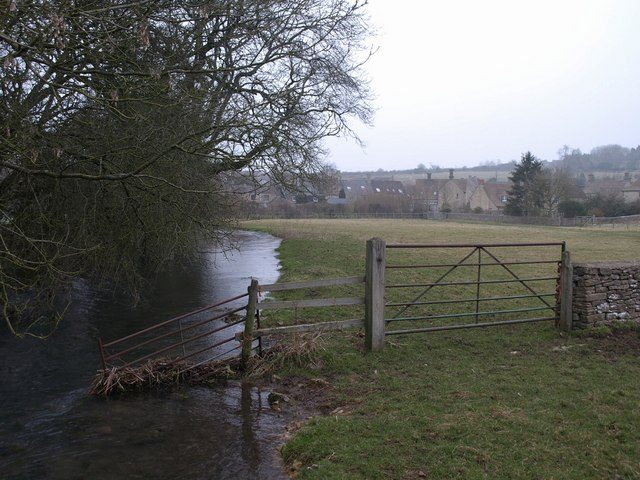
- River Churn near Baunton

- Location within Gloucestershire
- Population: 299 (2011 Census)
- District: Cotswold
- Shire county: Gloucestershire
- Region: South West
- Country: England
- Sovereign state: United Kingdom
- Post town: Cirencester
- Postcode district: GL7
- Police: Gloucestershire
- Fire: Gloucestershire
- Ambulance: South Western
- UK Parliament: North Cotswolds

Baunton is a village and civil parish in the Cotswold district of Gloucestershire, England, located about two miles north of Cirencester on the River Churn.

There is archaeological evidence of human habitation around the village in Prehistoric and Roman times. The village is recorded in Domesday Book in 1086 under the name of Baudintone which means an estate associated with a man called Balda.

The Norman church of St Mary Magdalene was built by the Augustinian monks of Cirencester Abbey as a Chapel of Ease in about 1150. Inside there is large wall painting, probably dating from the 14th century, which depicts St Christopher carrying the Christ Child across a stream. It became the parish church in 1551. The village contains a number of Grade II listed buildings including the 16th century Manor House and Baunton Mill. The village is in an Area of Outstanding Natural Beauty and much of it is classified a Conservation Area.

The Manor of Baunton belonged to a succession of families including the George and Chester Master families. John George of Baunton was MP for Cirencester at the time of the Civil War. He was initially a Parliamentarian, but when his life was spared by the Royalists who had captured him, he converted to the King's side.

According to the 2001 census it had a population of 290, increasing to 299 at the 2011 census.

The village is at the southern edge of the Churn Valley electoral ward, which stretches up the valley to Coberley. The total ward population taken at the 2011 census was 1,970.
