= Milbury Heath =

Hamlet in Gloucestershire, England

Coordinates: 51.60963°N 2.48372°W

Milbury Heath is a hamlet in South Gloucestershire, England, located east of Thornbury. The hamlet has a garden centre and a few other farm shops. The heath is a local high point (109 m above sea level at grid reference ST666902) and offers views west across the Severn Vale, and north into the Vale of Berkeley. A seat at the viewpoint commemorates the centenary of Falfield Parish Council in 1994. The hamlet has a former (Methodist?) chapel now converted to a private house, and a duck-pond.

The hamlet is on the Avon Cycleway. Both the A38 road and M5 motorway pass nearby. Just to the north on the A38, (technically in Buckover), is the White Horse pub.

== Robin killing controversy ==
The garden centre at Milbury Heath has come under fire due to the treatment of robins who were nesting there and were sometimes flying in the cafeteria section. They were killed after getting permission from DEFRA. This sparked controversy among many groups, including the RSPCA. The garden centre defended the killings by claiming they were "a pest" and a "health hazard".
