= Compton Abdale =

Village in Gloucestershire, England

Coordinates: 51.84°N 01.91°W

- Location within Gloucestershire
- Population: 125 (2011)
- OS grid reference: SP0616
- Shire county: Gloucestershire
- Region: South West
- Country: England
- Sovereign state: United Kingdom
- Post town: Cheltenham
- Postcode district: GL54
- Police: Gloucestershire
- Fire: Gloucestershire
- Ambulance: South Western
- UK Parliament: North Cotswolds

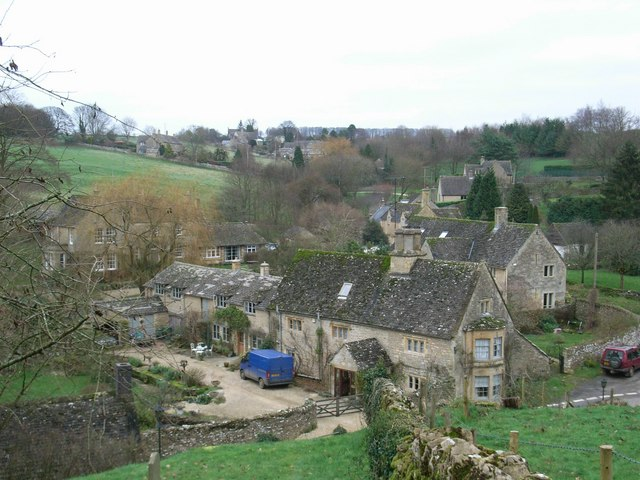
Compton Abdale

Compton Abdale is a small village in Gloucestershire, England, on the Roman "White Way", which ran North from Cirencester ("Corinium"). The village lies about 9 miles North of Cirencester, 1 mile South of the A40 London road.

In 1870–1872, John Marius Wilson's Imperial Gazetteer of England and Wales described Compton Abdale like this:

COMPTON-ABDALE, a parish in Northleach district, Gloucester; on the river Colne, 3 miles WNW of Northleach, and 9 SE by E of Cheltenham r. station. Post town, Northleach, under Cheltenham. Acres, 2, 215. Real property, £2, 047. Pop., 258. Houses, 49. The property is divided among a few. Part of the surface is heath. The living is a vicarage in the diocese of Gloucester and Bristol. Value, £81. Patrons, the Dean and Chapter of Bristol. The church was repaired in 1859.

The Anglican church building, St Oswald's, situated at the top of a steep hill, dates back to the 13th century and features unusual gargoyles. At the foot of the church path in the centre of the village a spring-fed brook emerges from a "crocodile" head constructed from stone by a local mason in the mid-19th century. This brook flows through the village before eventually joining the River Coln at Cassey Compton, which in turn joins the Thames near Lechlade.

The remains of a Roman villa to the South of the village, in a wood now called Compton Grove, were known to local people in the 19th century, when some surviving materials were removed. The villa site was excavated in 1931 by a schoolmaster and pupils from Cheltenham Grammar School, but the principal trench left by their excavations was later filled from the brook by the landowner to form a swimming pool.
