= Ball's Green =

Hamlet in Gloucestershire, England

Coordinates: 51.6953°N 2.1937°W

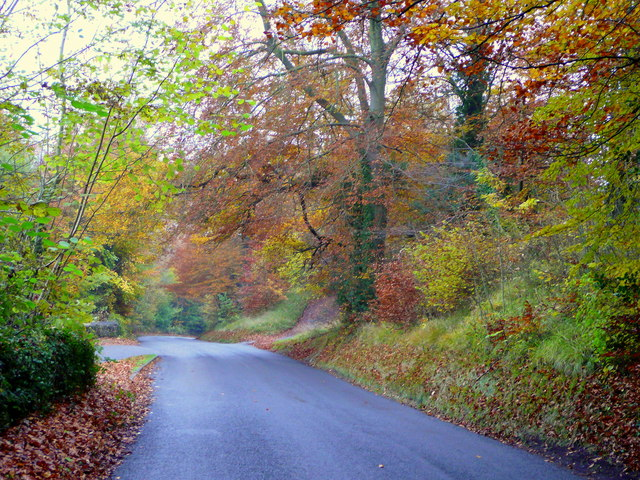
- New Road, Ball's Green

- Location within Gloucestershire
- OS grid reference: ST8699
- Civil parish: Minchinhampton
- District: Stroud
- Shire county: Gloucestershire
- Region: South West
- Country: England
- Sovereign state: United Kingdom
- Post town: Stroud
- Postcode district: GL6
- Police: Gloucestershire
- Fire: Gloucestershire
- Ambulance: South Western

Ball's Green is a hamlet in Gloucestershire, England.

Ball's Green House and Ball's Green Cottage, a Grade II listed building, is located in the hamlet.
