= Rodley, Gloucestershire =

Coordinates: 51.8011°N 2.36985°W

- Civil parish: Westbury-on-Severn
- Country: England
- Sovereign state: United Kingdom

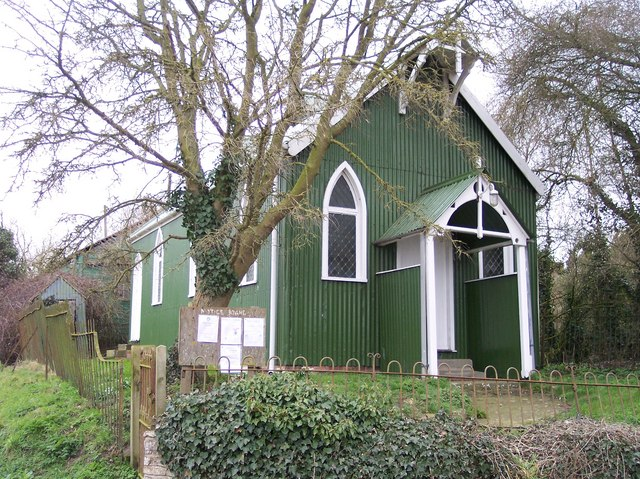
Rodley Church

Rodley is a settlement in Westbury-on-Severn parish, Forest of Dean District, Gloucestershire, England. It lies to the south east of Westbury-on-Severn, surrounded on three sides by a loop of the River Severn.

Rodley has a tin church, known as Rodley Mission Church. This is a prefabricated church constructed in 1908 of galvanised metal over a wooden interior. It is used for occasional services.

There are three Grade II listed buildings in Rodley: Court Farmhouse, 17th century with an early 18th-century extension; Dove House, built 1766–77; and Rodley Court, an 18th-century farmhouse.
