= Hinton, Stroud =

Village in Gloucestershire, England

Hinton
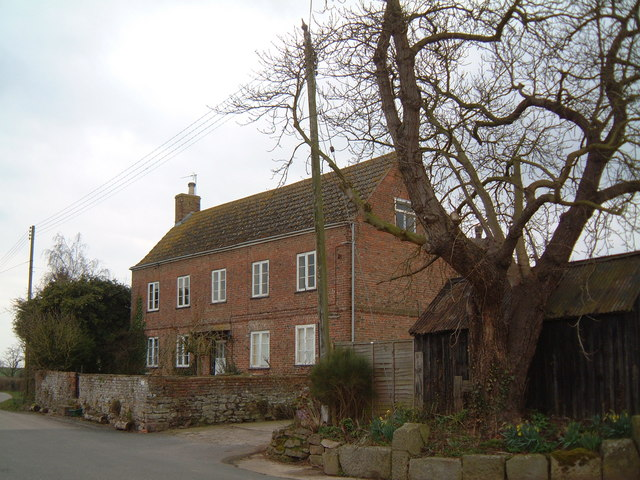
- Kingshill Farm, Hinton

- Location within Gloucestershire
- Population: 1,083 (2011 Census)
- District: Stroud
- Shire county: Gloucestershire
- Region: South West
- Country: England
- Sovereign state: United Kingdom
- Post town: Berkeley
- Postcode district: GL13
- Police: Gloucestershire
- Fire: Gloucestershire
- Ambulance: South Western
- UK Parliament: Stroud

Hinton is a village and civil parish near Berkeley in Stroud district, Gloucestershire. The parish includes the larger villages of Sharpness and Purton. The ecclesiastical parish is Sharpness with Purton, formerly part of the parish of Berkeley and now united with Slimbridge.

In the 2001 census the civil parish had a population of 1,141, decreasing to 1,083 at the 2011 census.

== See also ==
- Hinton (place name)
