= Upleadon =

Village in Gloucestershire, England

Coordinates: 51.93967°N 2.35721°W

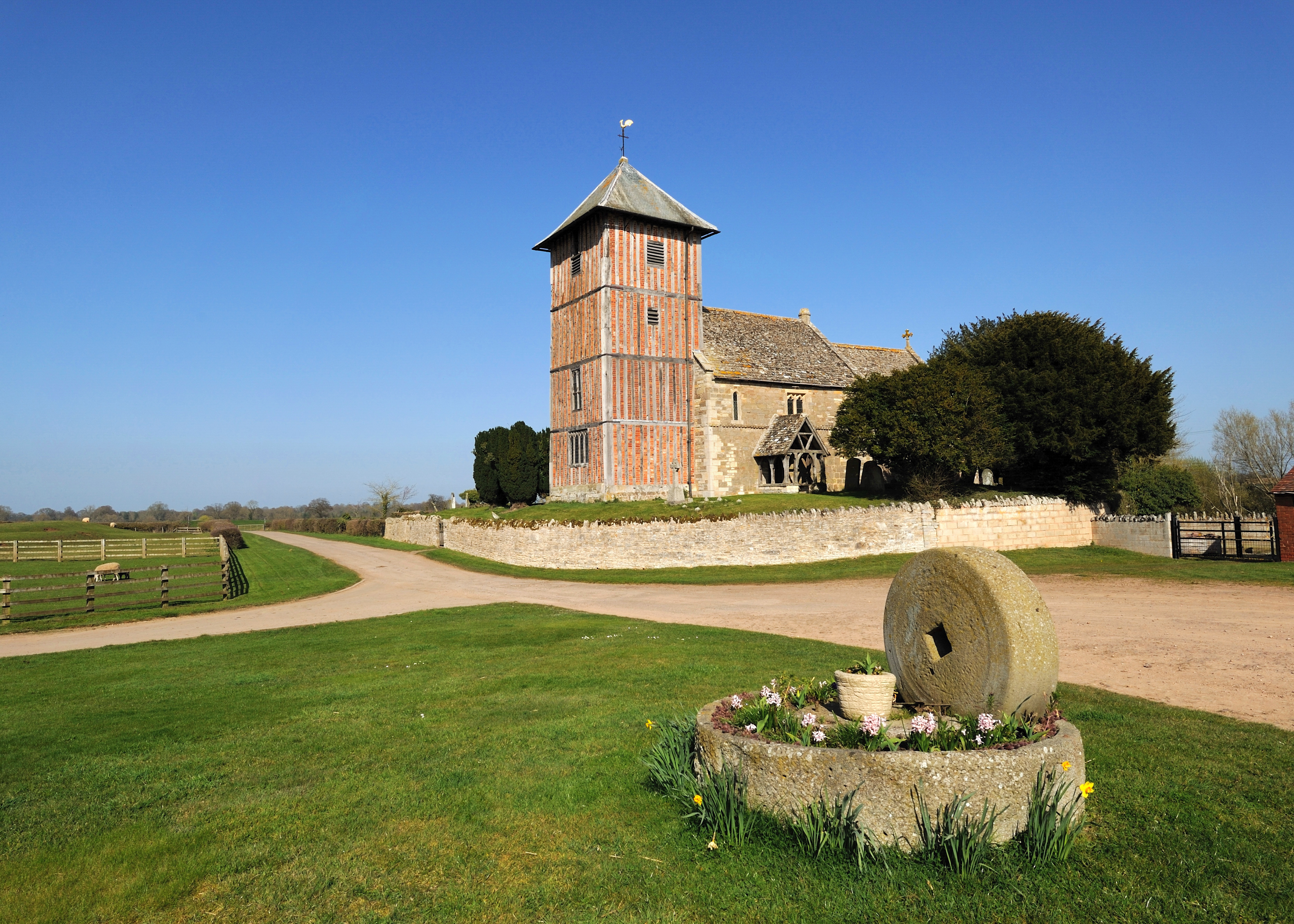
- St Mary the Virgin

- Location within Gloucestershire
- Population: 276 (2011)
- OS grid reference: SO7626
- Civil parish: Upleadon
- District: Forest of Dean
- Shire county: Gloucestershire
- Region: South West
- Country: England
- Sovereign state: United Kingdom
- Post town: Gloucester
- Postcode district: GL18
- Police: Gloucestershire
- Fire: Gloucestershire
- Ambulance: South Western
- UK Parliament: Forest of Dean

Upleadon is a village and civil parish situated 10.5 km north-west of Gloucester. Soon after the Norman conquest Upleadon became part of the estates of Gloucester Abbey and was recorded as such in the Domesday Book. Taking advantage of the nearby river, there was a period when iron forges were a focal point for the community but these were subsequently converted into a flour-mill. The village today extends southwards alongside the River Leadon and has a population of 213 according to the Gloucestershire County Council.

Standing opposite the parish church, Upleadon Court is a large 18th-century farmhouse, but the asymmetry of its north front suggests that it was built around an older house. The lower timber-framed west wing was built in the late 16th or early 17th century. Several outbuildings also predate the main house.

== St Mary the Virgin, Parish Church ==
While there is evidence of much earlier worship on the site the current church is 11th century in origin but has been heavily modified over the centuries. The Tudor era tower is a rare, if not unique design as it is timbered from the base to its height and inlaid with red brick. The half-timbered main structure was added in the early 16th century and has a ‘wishbone’ type cross bracing. What used to be the Saxon era East window now forms an arched entrance into the sanctuary. The nave and carved North doorway are both 12th century Norman.

A rare Blackletter Bible printed in 1613 is on display in a case within the church. The interior is devoid of monuments and retains a simple decor throughout.

English Heritage has listed St Mary The Virgin in Upleadon as a Grade I heritage building for its architectural and historical significance. Historic England has placed the bridge on the Heritage at Risk register.

== Carswalls Farm ==
Artist Paul Nash took a collection of photographs around Carswalls Farm, Upleadon, Newent in the late 1930s or early 1940s, that are held in the archives of the Tate.

== Sources ==
1. David Verey - Gloucestershire 2, The Vale and The Forest of Dean, 1970 - Journal Title: The Buildings of England
