= Pillowell =

Former mining village in Gloucestershire, England

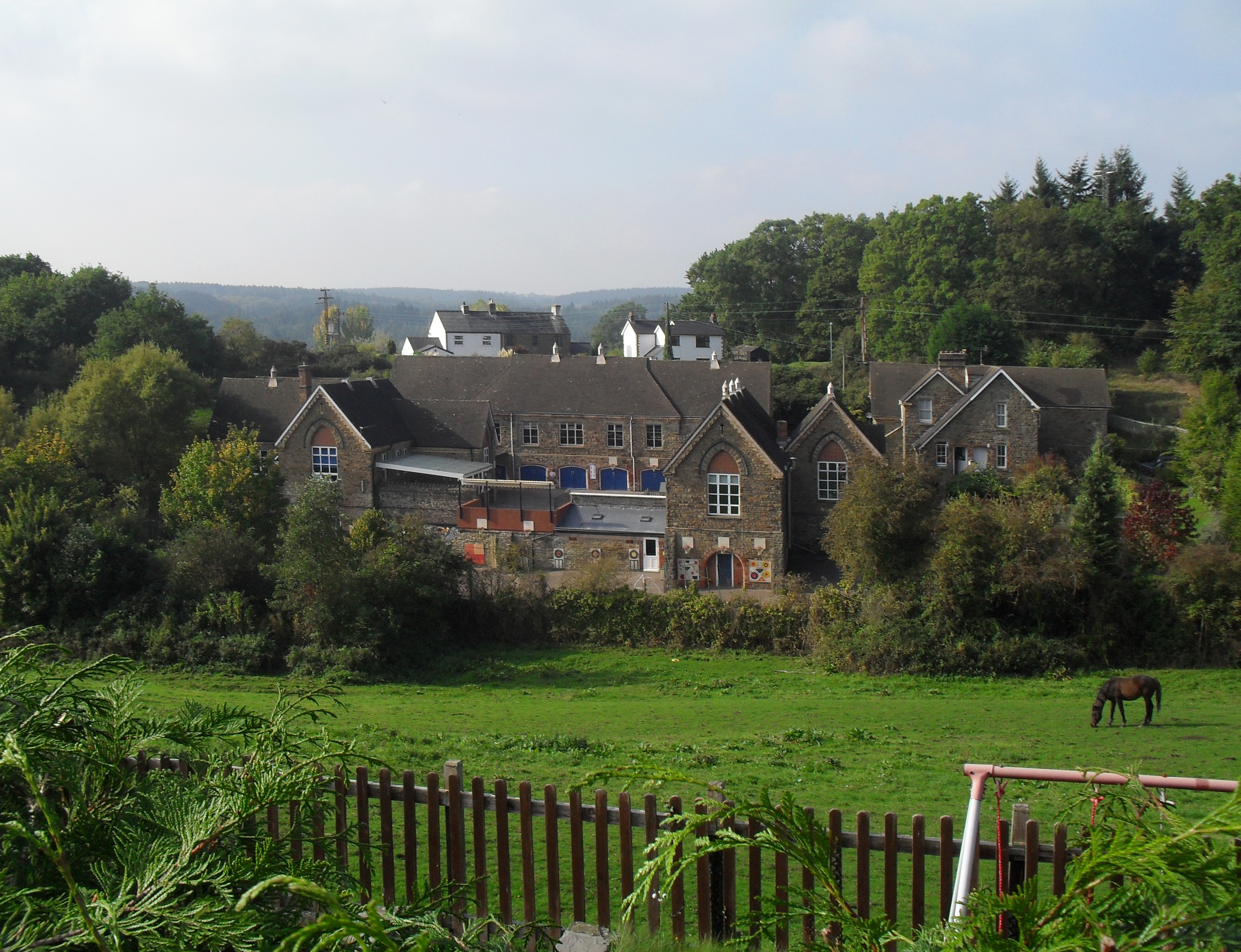

- Location within Gloucestershire
- OS grid reference: SO627064
- Civil parish: West Dean
- District: Forest of Dean
- Shire county: Gloucestershire
- Region: South West
- Country: England
- Sovereign state: United Kingdom
- Police: Gloucestershire
- Fire: Gloucestershire
- Ambulance: South Western
- UK Parliament: Forest of Dean

Pillowell is a small English village in Gloucestershire, on the south-eastern edge of the Forest of Dean. Once a mining village, much of it now lies in a conservation area.

== Description ==
Pillowell's coordinates are 51.75° N 02.55° W. It rose to be a mining village, directly east of Whitecroft and directly west of Yorkley. Much of it lies in a conservation area. Its current population is about 250 in a housing stock of 101. The village has a place of worship: a late 19th-century Methodist chapel.

Pillowell Community Primary School, founded in the 19th century, briefly became known nationally in 1973, when its pupils under their music teacher Mrs Davies, sang "I'm Forever Blowing Bubbles" as the signature tune for Winifred Foley's A Child of the Forest, when it was serialized on BBC Woman's Hour. The poet F. W. Harvey spent the last part of his life in the village.

== History ==
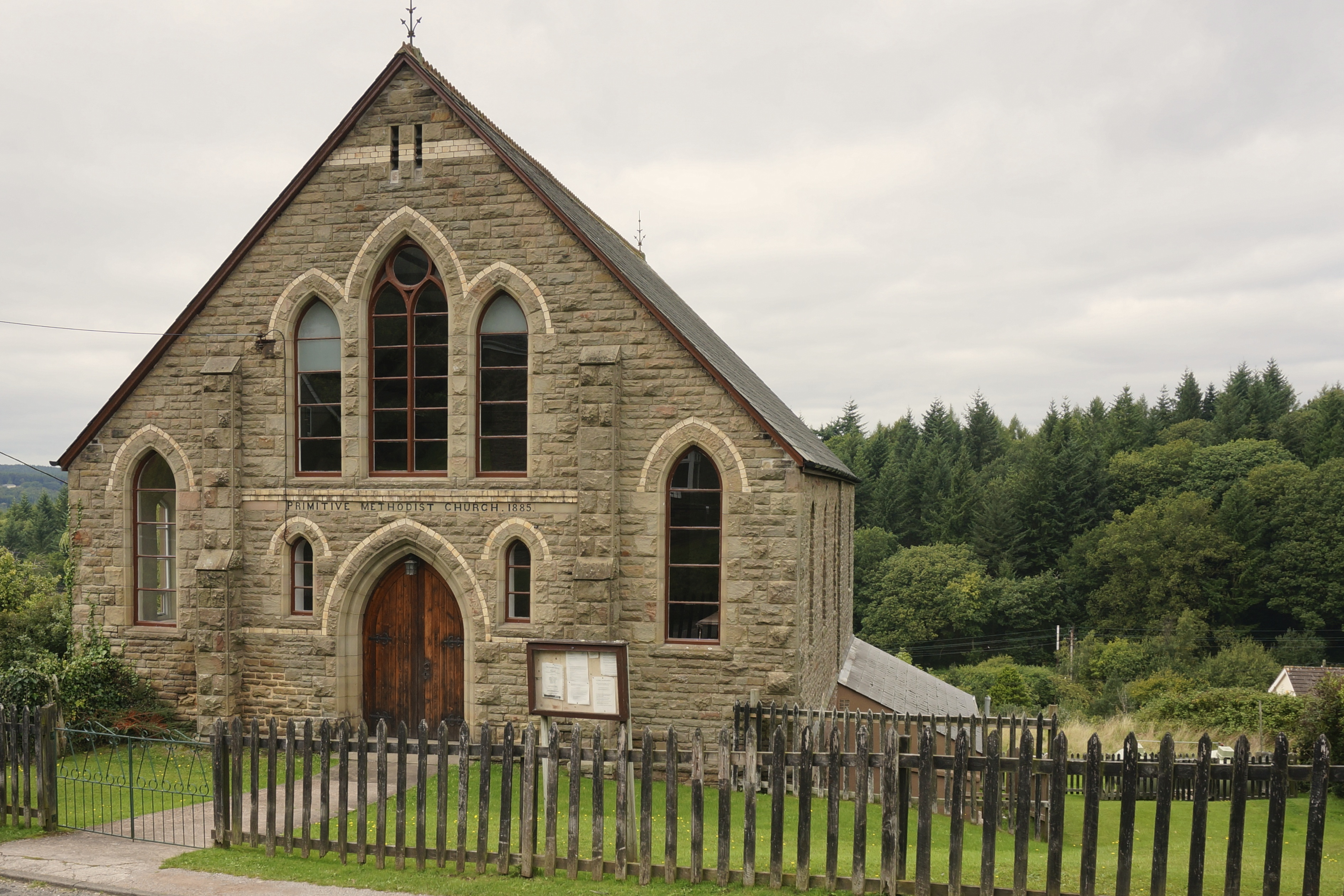
Pillowell Methodist Church

According to the conservation-area documents, the earliest inhabitants may have been squatters on the edge of the royal Forest of Dean. In 1787, when the area still belonged to Newland parish, there were ten dwellings on Crown land, near the well that gave the settlement its name. Stronger growth came in the mid-19th century with the development of deep mining.

A Primitive Methodist chapel was built in 1835, when there were around 30 cottages. The building is now in residential use. A larger chapel opened on a new site in 1885. A large school for the area opened in 1877, with places for 400 children. Average attendance was 281 in 1889 and 501 in 1901. However, the roll in 1992 was down to 61. The Swan opened as a beerhouse in the Bream Road before 1891. A Co-operative store was open by the early 20th century.

Coal mining throughout the Forest of Dean began to decline in the 1930s. The Princess Royal Colliery finally closed in 1962. A spiral brick chute and parts of a mineral railway bridge remain.

== Pillowell Silver Band ==
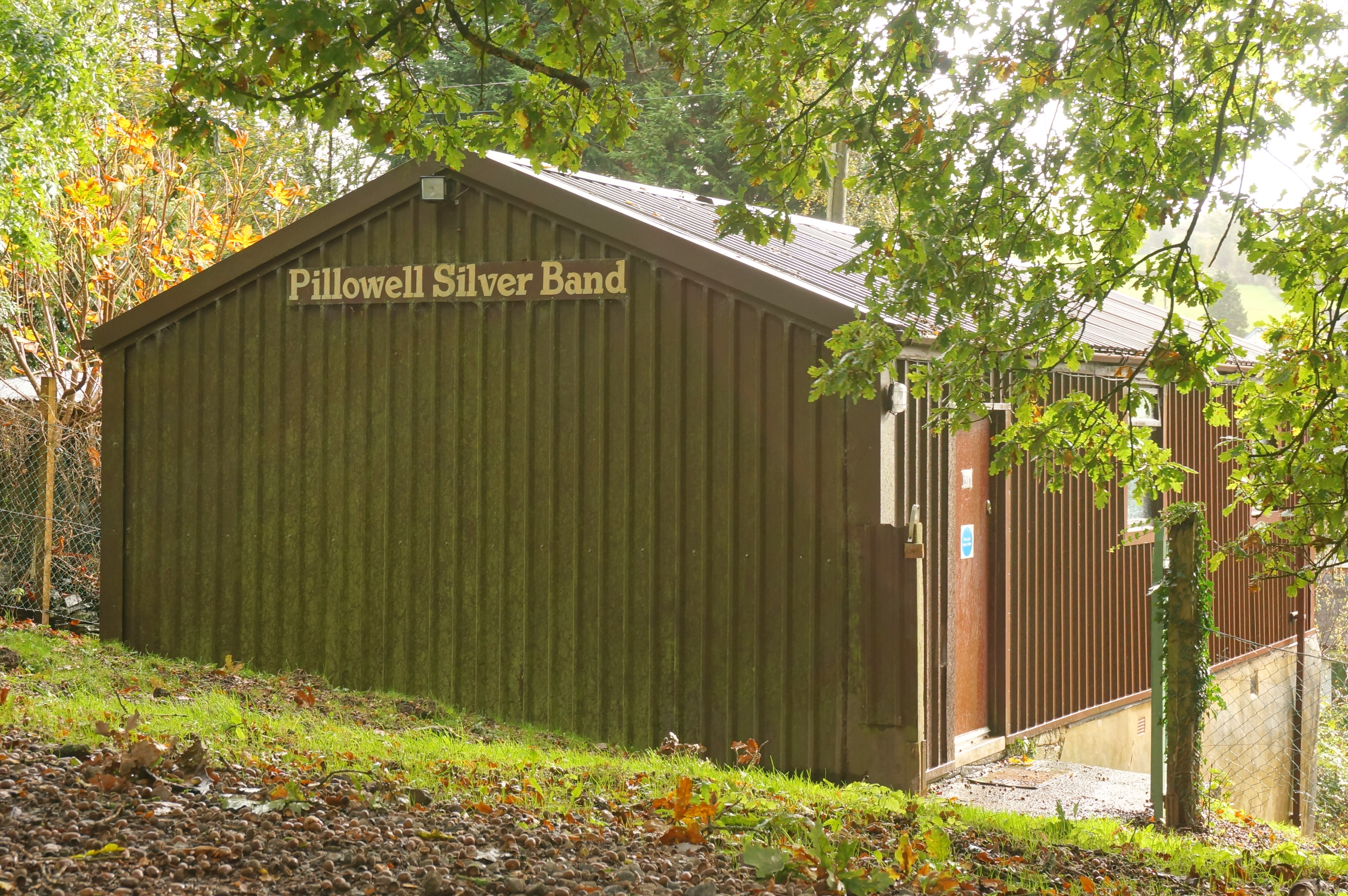
Pillowell Silver Band hall

The Pillowell Silver Band is a competing band which performs at fetes, concerts and contests throughout the year. It has enjoyed many great conductors over the years, including T. J. Powell. The long-serving conductor, Clive Lewis, led it up from the fourth section of the national championships, and along with Alan Beddis and Fred Watkins, taught many of the children in the local village schools to play. In 2004 it was runner-up in the National 4th Section Championships of Great Britain, beaten by a single point for the title, and in 2015 it won the fourth section regional finals in Torquay under the bands current conductor, Ian Whitburn. In 2015 the band competed again at the national finals, finishing 8th in the country. In 2017 it gained promotion from the fourth section to the third. In 2020 the band pulled out of the Area Contest due to the Covid-19 pandemic and as a result is now competing in the fourth section.
