= Lypiatt =

Village in Gloucestershire, England

Coordinates: 51.75351°N 2.14047°W

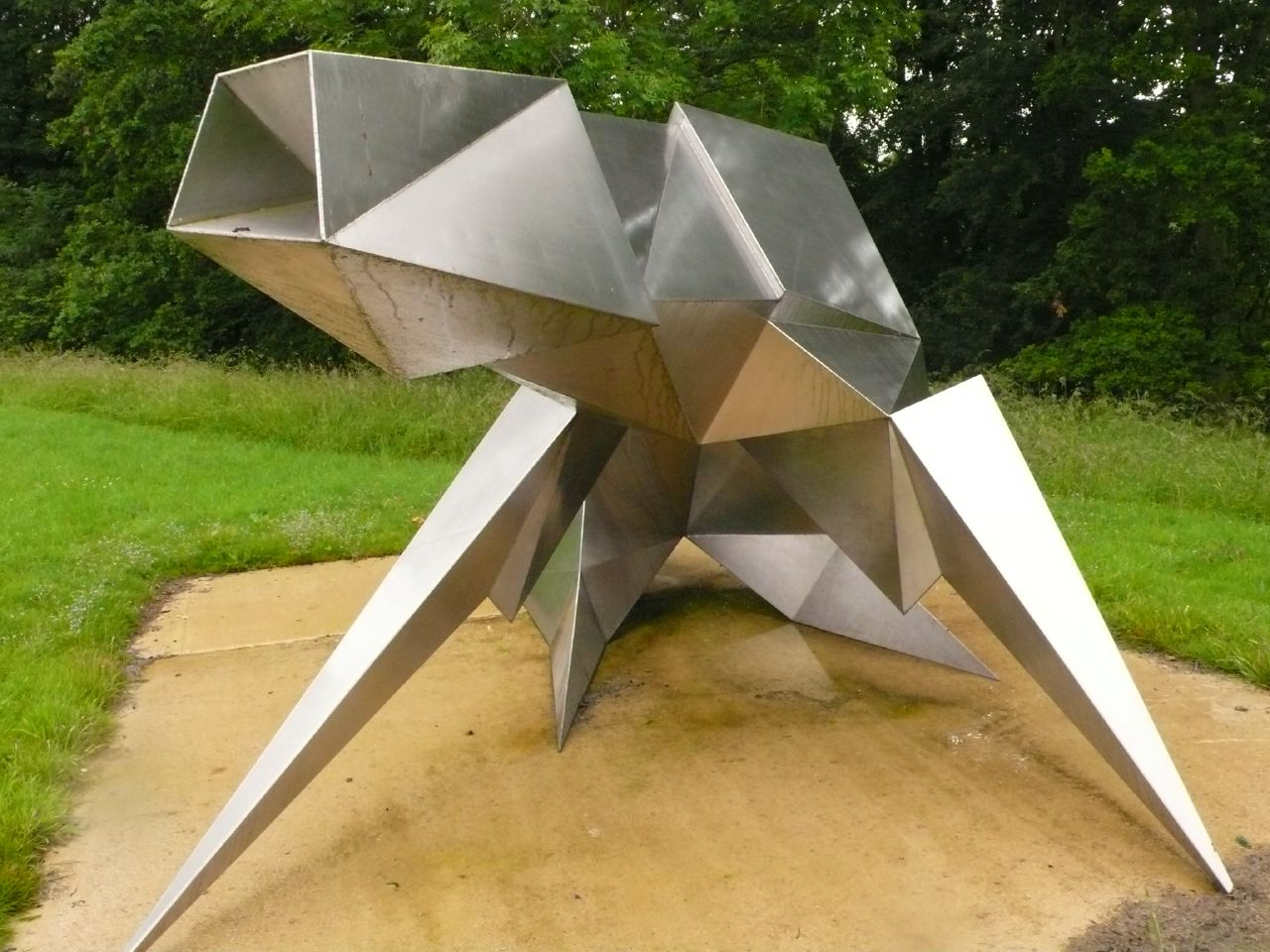
- Dog by Lynn Chadwick at Lypiatt Park in Stroud, Gloucestershire/UK

- Location within Gloucestershire
- Civil parish: Miserden
- District: Stroud
- Shire county: Gloucestershire
- Region: South West
- Country: England
- Sovereign state: United Kingdom

Lypiatt is a small village and former civil parish, now in the parish of Miserden, in the Stroud district, in Gloucestershire, England, approximately 4 miles (6 km) east of Stroud.

The parish was formed from Stroud in 1894, later in 1894 the parish was abolished to form "Bisley with Lypiatt".

The parish is noted for two historic houses:

- Lypiatt Park, of medieval origins, home of the late Modernist sculptor Lynn Chadwick and his family
- a neo-Classical manor house, Nether Lypiatt Manor, formerly the home of Violet Gordon-Woodhouse and Prince and Princess Michael of Kent, who sold in 2006 to Paul Drayson.
