= Coombe, Gloucestershire =

Settlement in Gloucestershire, England

Coordinates: 51.64342°N 2.33667°W

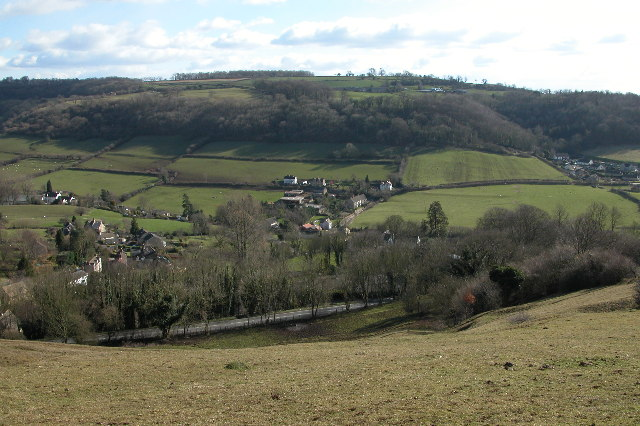
Coombe

Coombe is a settlement in the English county of Gloucestershire. It is adjacent to the town of Wotton-under-Edge. The town name can also be found spelled C-o-m-b-e.
