= Boulsdon =

Village in Gloucestershire, England

Coordinates: 51.91°N 02.43°W

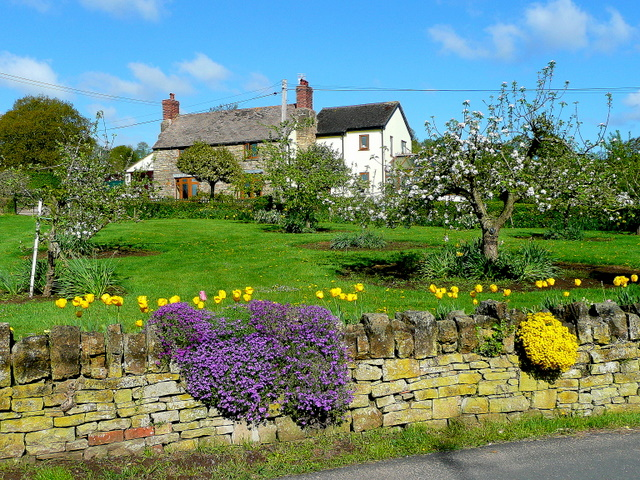
- Woodbar Cottage

- Location within Gloucestershire
- OS grid reference: SO7024
- Shire county: Gloucestershire
- Region: South West
- Country: England
- Sovereign state: United Kingdom
- Police: Gloucestershire
- Fire: Gloucestershire
- Ambulance: South Western

Boulsdon is a village in Gloucestershire, England.

It is the location of the International Centre for Birds of Prey.

A low mound in the village may have been the site of a motte and is known as Boulsdon Manor.
