= Bamfurlong, Gloucestershire =

Village in Gloucestershire, England

Coordinates: 51°53′33″N 2°9′0″W

Bamfurlong
- Location within Gloucestershire
- District: Tewkesbury
- Shire county: Gloucestershire
- Region: South West
- Country: England
- Sovereign state: United Kingdom
- Post town: Cheltenham
- Postcode district: GL51
- Police: Gloucestershire
- Fire: Gloucestershire
- Ambulance: South Western
- UK Parliament: Tewkesbury

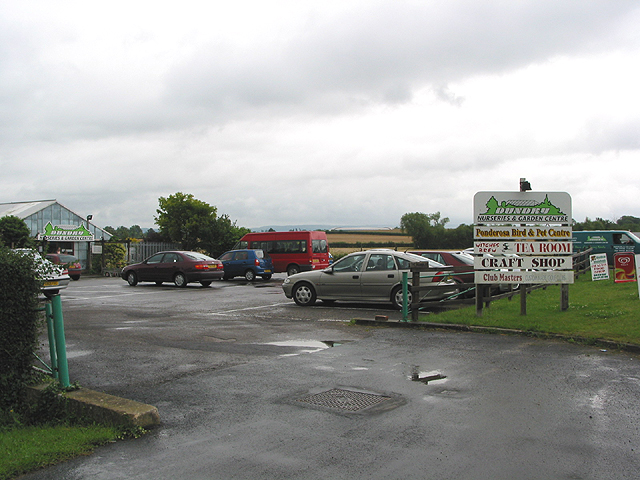
Entrance to a garden centre in Bamfurlong

Bamfurlong is a village in Gloucestershire, England, between Cheltenham and Gloucester, near Gloucestershire Airport, and divided in two by the M5 motorway. There is no access from one half of Bamfurlong to the other (east to west) other than via Bamfurlong Lane and the motorway bridge.

== Slowest internet in UK ==
A survey in 2018 said homes on Greenmeadows Park in Bamfurlong had the slowest broadband internet access in the UK at 0.14 megabits per second. (Mbps). That was nearly 1,900 times slower than the fastest access, which was in Birmingham.
