= Yorkley =

Village in Gloucestershire, England

Coordinates: 51.7607°N 2.5279°W

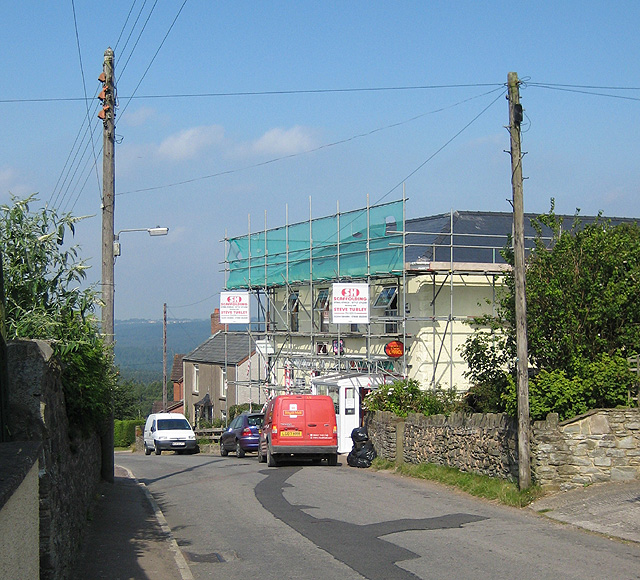

- Location within Gloucestershire
- OS grid reference: SO636070
- District: Forest of Dean
- Shire county: Gloucestershire
- Region: South West
- Country: England
- Sovereign state: United Kingdom
- Police: Gloucestershire
- Fire: Gloucestershire
- Ambulance: South Western
- UK Parliament: Forest of Dean

Yorkley is a village in west Gloucestershire, England. The village includes the settlement of Yorkley Slade to the east. Yorkley is situated between the villages of Pillowell and Oldcroft.

Near the town of Lydney, it has two pubs, a sub post office, one main shop, Yorkley school and is home to Yorkley FC.

Yorkley was also home to Yorkley Star Cricket Club for 130 years until it was forced to close in October 2015 due to repeated digging of the Cut and Fry Green pitch by feral boar.

== History ==
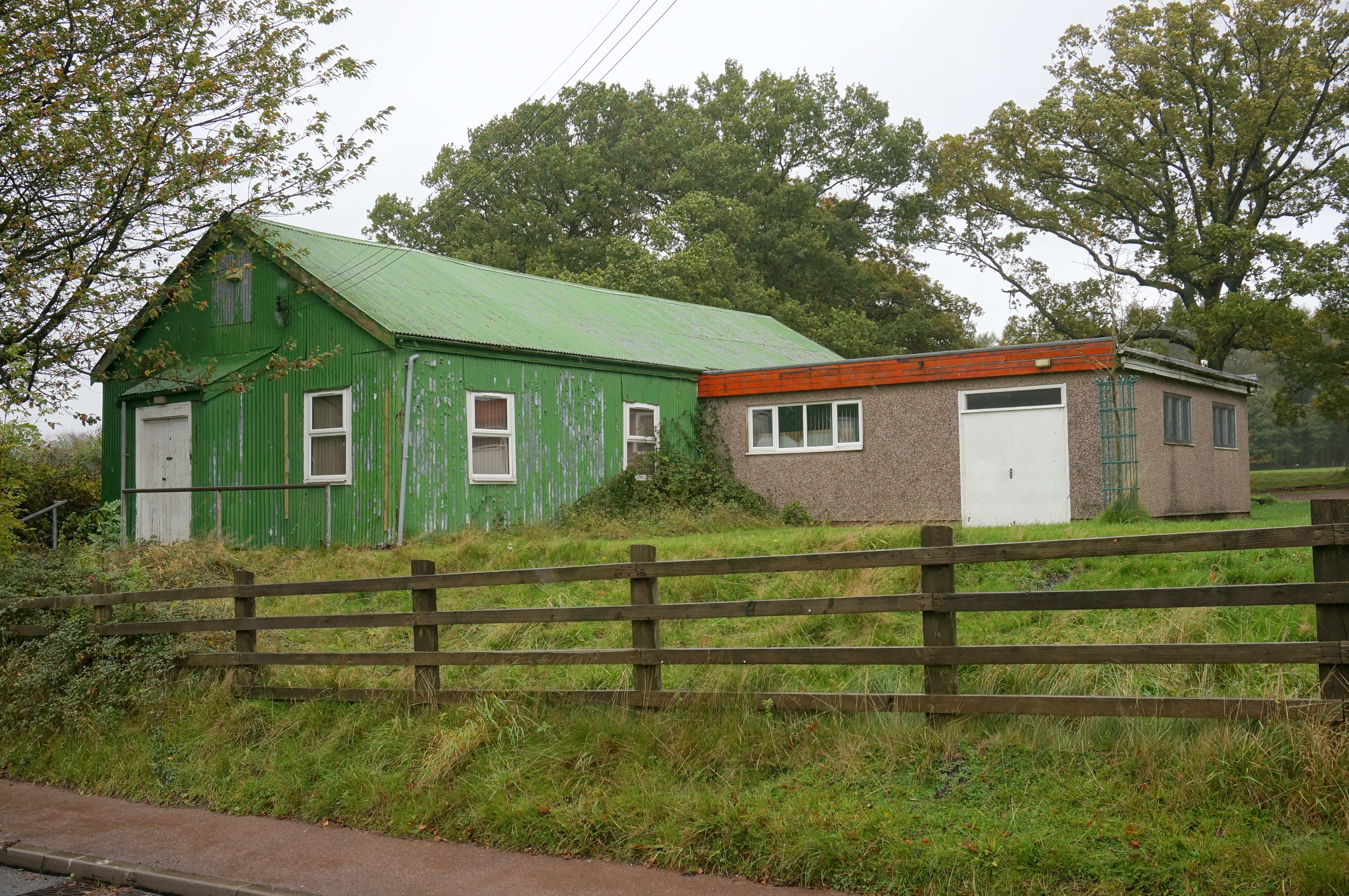
Yorkley Memorial Hall

Cottages are recorded in both Yorkley and Yorkley Slade (formerly the Slade) in the 1780s. The Nag's Head Inn, at Yorkley Slade, is recorded from 1788 and was enlarged around 1850. In the mid 19th century much rebuilding and new building took place at Yorkley, some of it by employees at the Parkend Ironworks. The inn now known as the Bailey Inn, dates from around 1910 when it was known as the Royal Oak. From 1930 a large estate of council houses was formed on the north side of Yorkley Slade.

Yorkley had a working men's institute in 1892. A new institute was built on Bailey Hill around 1910 and a recreation ground was laid out next to it in the early 1920s as the district's war memorial. Yorkley Onward band started in 1903 as an offshoot of the Pillowell band and its hall, built in 1913, has been used for village activities.

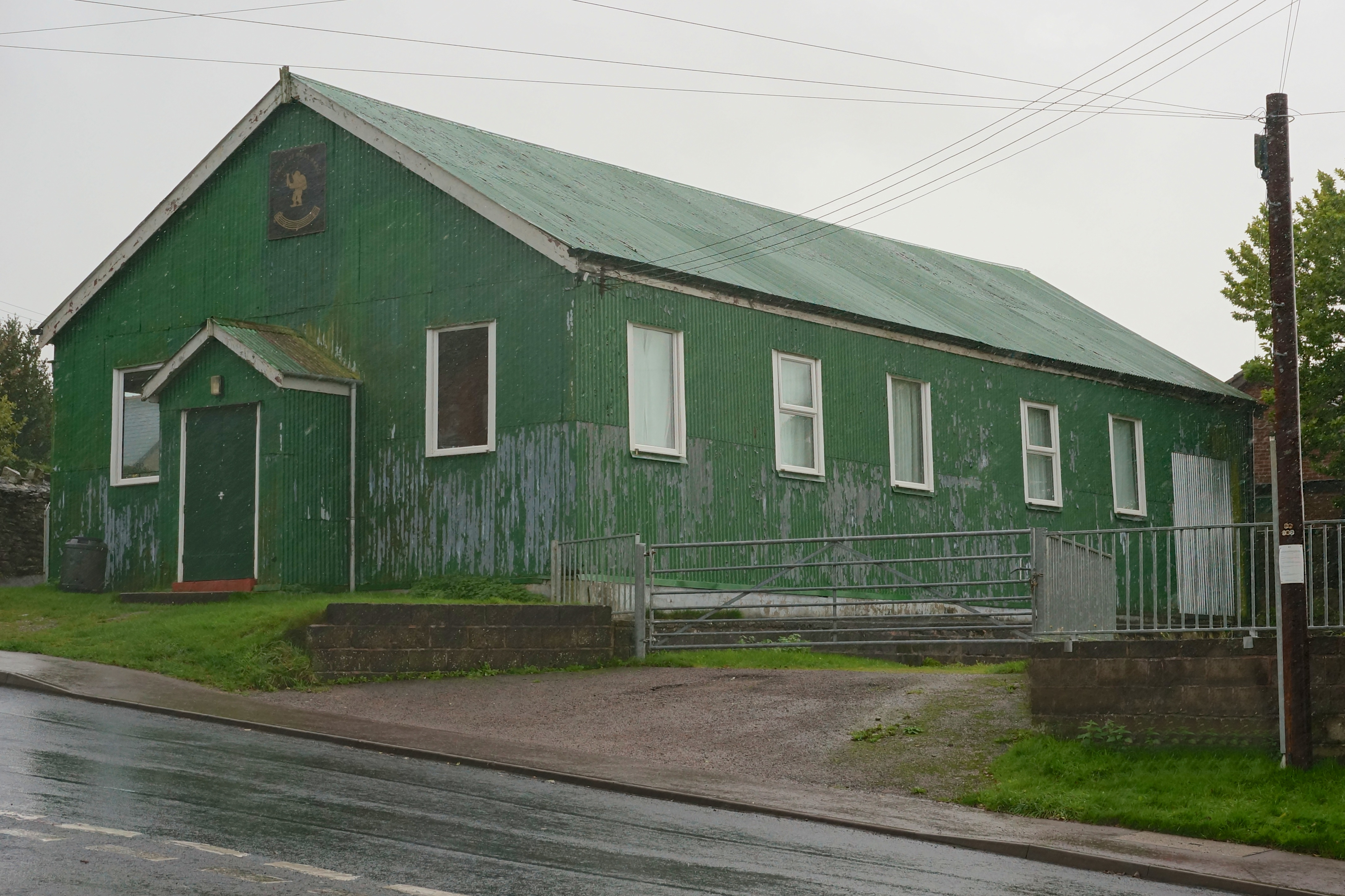
Yorkley Onward Band hall

Mining was once a major source of employment in the area, and there was an opencast coal mine at Yorkley as recently as 1960.

== Notable residents ==
- Poet F. W. Harvey lived in Yorkley at the time of his death.
- Football manager Jacob Cole, notable for having the worst win percentage in North Gloucestershire football history.
- Lesser known criminal with ties to the Russian and Polish criminal groups in the UK Dave Cole was raised in Yorkley before moving away in 2015.

== Map sources ==
- Map sources for Yorkley
