= Pope's Hill =

Coordinates: 51.82821°N 2.46139°W

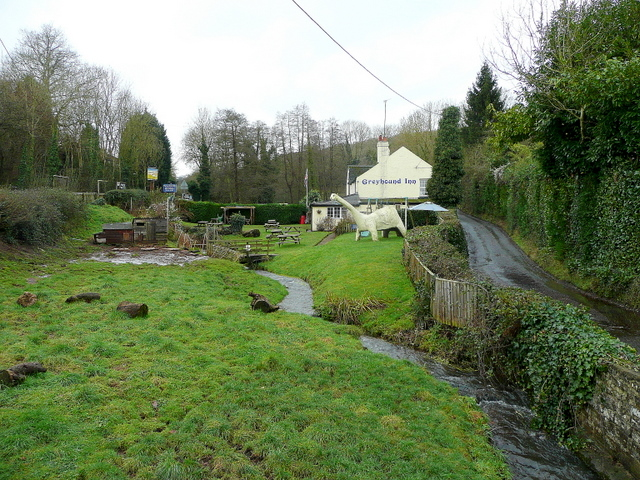
The former Greyhound Inn in 2009

Pope's Hill is a hill and a small village situated in the east of the Forest of Dean, Gloucestershire within the parish of Littledean. The hill is 12 miles south west of Gloucester and 3 miles east of Cinderford. The small village of Flaxley lies in the valley to the immediate north. Pope's Hill is said to have got its name from Mary Pope, who used to reside in Flaxley Abbey in the 18th century and walked over the hill as a young girl. She is buried in Flaxley churchyard.

A principal road runs over the hill starting from the A4151 just east of Littledean and rejoins the A4151 further east at the Greyhound Inn. The A4151 runs along the southern flank of the hill. A steep section of road on the Flaxley side, Joey's Pitch, is notorious for being impassable in ice and snow. There are numerous other small roads and tracks linking the houses and smallholdings which are scattered across the hill. Rising to the west is Chestnuts Enclosure, an area of Forestry Commission woodland, and to the north, Welshbury Hill which has Iron Age workings.

The Greyhound Inn was a popular pub beside the busy main road until its closure in 2016 following a robbery and subsequent fire. It was noted for its large concrete and plaster model dinosaur in the pub garden (known as "Horace") built by local craftsman Bill Taylor whilst refurbishing the pub interior. The White House Hotel is located at the summit. Pope's Hill offers extensive views of the Severn Vale, Gloucester, Cheltenham, as far north as Bredon Hill and as far south as the hills above Bath. The entire Cotswold Edge is also visible, and May Hill dominates the view to the north.

A small chapel close to the Greyhound Inn is now a private house.
