= Oldcroft =

Hamlet in Gloucestershire, England

Coordinates: 51.7523°N 2.5106°W

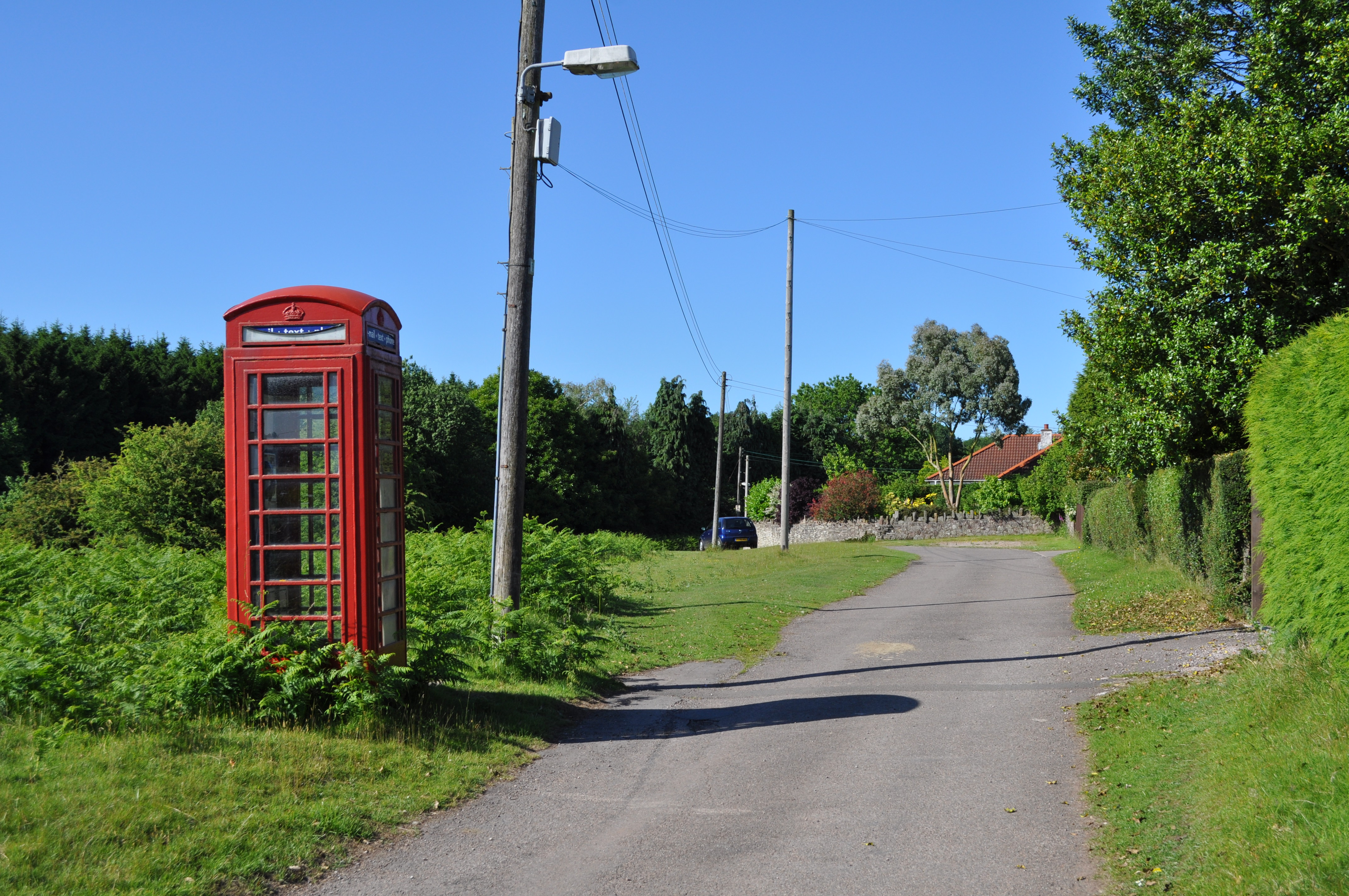

- Location within Gloucestershire
- Population: 785
- OS grid reference: SO648060
- District: Forest of Dean
- Shire county: Gloucestershire
- Region: South West
- Country: England
- Sovereign state: United Kingdom
- Police: Gloucestershire
- Fire: Gloucestershire
- Ambulance: South Western
- UK Parliament: Forest of Dean

Oldcroft is a hamlet in Gloucestershire, England. The village of Yorkley is to the northwest, and the hamlet of Viney Hill is to the northeast.

== History ==
Oldcroft is situated near the "Dean road", a medieval route that ran between Lydney and Mitcheldean. In the 17th century there were cabin dwellings in Oldcroft. Much of the early settlement was by squatters, and in 1782 there were thirteen cottages recorded at Deadman's Cross in Oldcroft. In 1834 Oldcroft contained around thirty-five scattered cottages. In the later 20th century several cottages were enlarged and some large houses were built, especially on the south-east side of the hamlet. There was once a pub in Oldcroft called the Loyal Forester – it closed before 1893.

The Primitive Methodists opened a chapel at Oldcroft in 1876. It closed, following storm damage, in 1929. It was later reopened as an independent church, but closed in the early 1960s, and from 1975 until 1991 the building was an electrical engineer's workshop. In 1958 the Assemblies of God also had a chapel at Oldcroft, demolished by 1975.
