= Bowbridge =

Village in Gloucestershire, England

Coordinates: 51.73°N 02.21°W

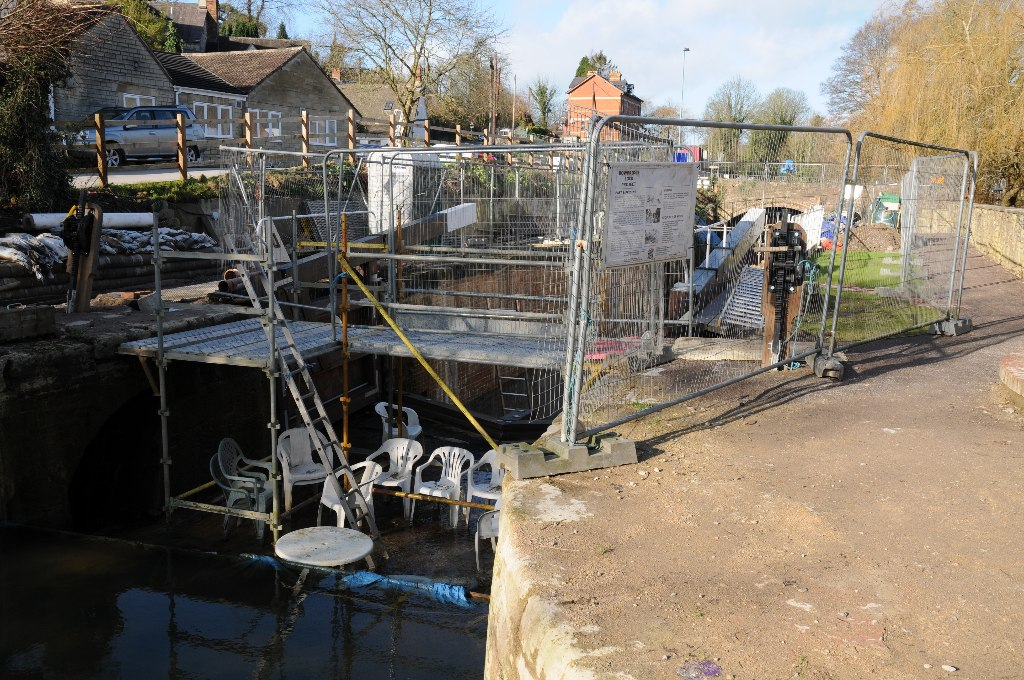
- Bowbridge Lock undergoing restoration

- Location within Gloucestershire
- OS grid reference: SO8504
- District: Stroud
- Shire county: Gloucestershire
- Region: South West
- Country: England
- Sovereign state: United Kingdom
- Police: Gloucestershire
- Fire: Gloucestershire
- Ambulance: South Western

Bowbridge is a village in Gloucestershire, England, on the outskirts of Stroud.

Bowbridge Lock on the Thames and Severn Canal is in the process of restoration.

Field House on Bowbridge Lane is a 17th-century house, now converted into apartments: it was formerly a youth hostel, a Territorial Army base and the headquarters of the county Air Training Corps.
