= Coalway =

Village in Gloucestershire, England

Coordinates: 51.78973°N 2.59902°W

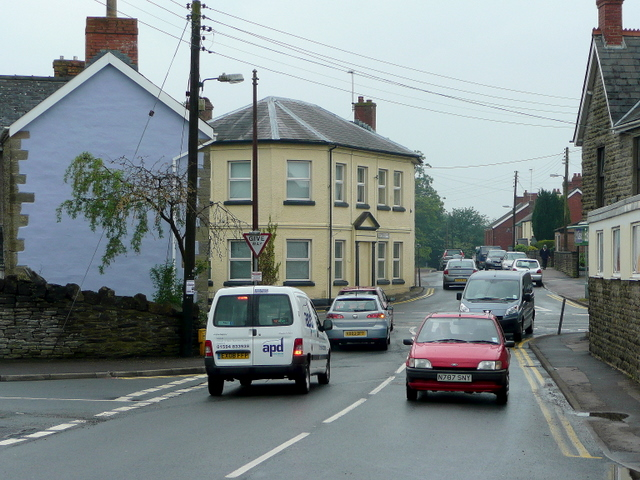

- Location within Gloucestershire
- OS grid reference: SO587102
- District: Forest of Dean
- Shire county: Gloucestershire
- Region: South West
- Country: England
- Sovereign state: United Kingdom
- Police: Gloucestershire
- Fire: Gloucestershire
- Ambulance: South Western
- UK Parliament: Forest of Dean

Coalway is a village in the West Forest of Dean region of Gloucestershire, England, approximately one mile south-east of the town of Coleford. Within the civil parish of Coleford, the village is just south of the village of Broadwell.

== History ==
An ancient route known in 1345 as the coal way ran north-westwards from the Forest boundary at Coalway Lane End and down Lord's hill to join the main road through Coleford east of Coller brook. Known later as Coller Lane, it was used by travellers from the Purton passage on the River Severn in the later 17th century.

Early building at Coalway was on or near the road between Coleford and Parkend, which was diverted southwards after it was turnpiked in 1796. There was a beerhouse at Coalway by 1841, and this had expanded to three public houses by the late 1870s. The Plough (opposite ‘The Rec’) The Britannia Inn on Coalway cross and The Crown Inn. The last remaining of these is The Crown Inn. Which had a field attached to it where bonfires and sheep sales was held. The Primitive Methodists built a chapel called "Pisgah" at Coalway in 1861.

A green was given by a local landowner to the people of Coalway for recreational and sports, in the latter part of the 1930’s. Funds was raised to build recreational equipment in the 70’s. A village hall was built on it and in 1988 changing rooms was built by the local football team Mushet and Coalway. A school opened in 1966 when Coalway Infants School opened; this was followed by Coalway Junior school in 1976.

The local woods have beautiful walks. Foxes, deer, badgers and wild boar are local to the forest.
