= Bibstone =

Village in Gloucestershire, England

Coordinates: 51.615°N 2.440°W

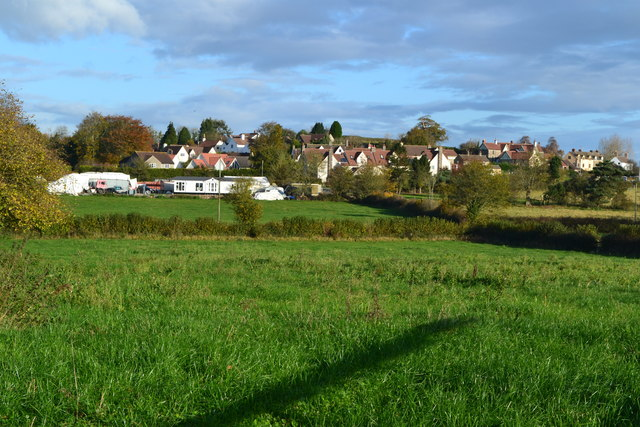
- Looking towards Bibstone from Townwell

- Location within Gloucestershire
- OS grid reference: ST6991
- Shire county: Gloucestershire
- Region: South West
- Country: England
- Sovereign state: United Kingdom
- Police: Gloucestershire
- Fire: Gloucestershire
- Ambulance: South Western

Bibstone is a village in Gloucestershire, England.
