= Moreton Valence =

Village and civil parish in Gloucestershire, England

Coordinates: 51.7899°N 2.3219°W

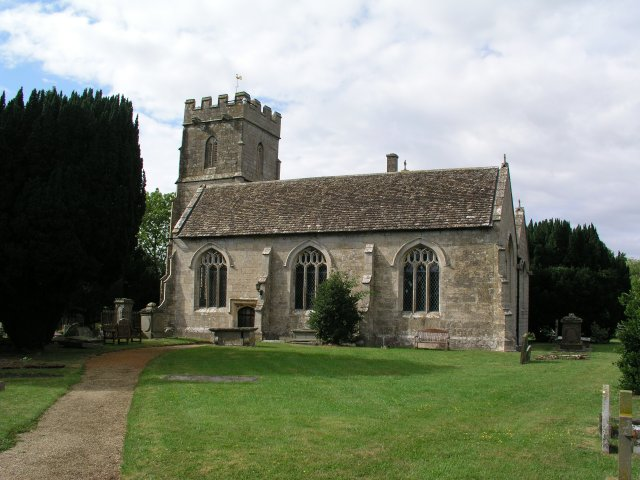
St. Stephen's Church

Moreton Valence is a village and civil parish 6 miles (9.7 km) south-west of Gloucester, Gloucestershire, England. The village is on the A38, just east from the river Severn. The estimated population of the civil parish in 2016 was 165.

The Gloucester and Sharpness Canal runs through the parish, with Parkend Canal bridge and Grade II listed Parkend Bridge House at the centre of the village. The village church, St Stephen's, is Grade I listed. There are other Grade II listed buildings within the village including Barracks Farmhouse, Mansfield House and Oakey Farmhouse. Most of the houses in Moreton Valence are built using Cotswold limestone.

RAF Moreton Valence was opened here in November 1939 and closed in July 1962. The airfield was to the east of the village between the A38 and B4008. During the Second World War the Gloster Aircraft Company was based here with RAF ancillary buildings including a storage depot between 1944 and 1947, and a military camp.
