= Hazleton, Gloucestershire =

Village in Gloucestershire, England

Coordinates: 51°51′29″N 1°53′10″W

Hazleton
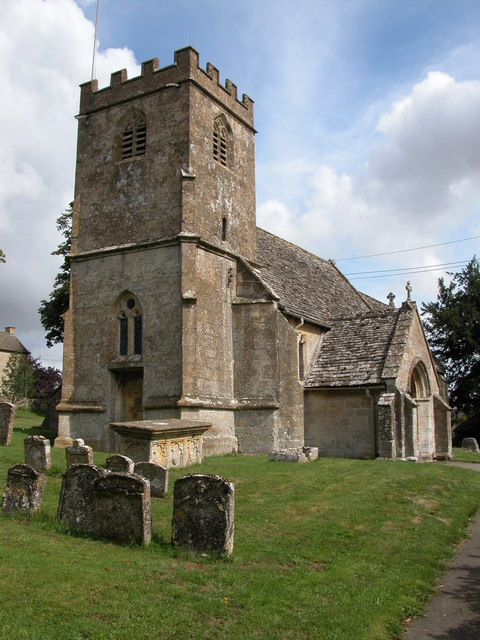
- Hazleton Church

- Location within Gloucestershire
- Population: 168 (2011)
- District: Cotswold
- Shire county: Gloucestershire
- Region: South West
- Country: England
- Sovereign state: United Kingdom
- Post town: Cheltenham
- Postcode district: GL54
- Police: Gloucestershire
- Fire: Gloucestershire
- Ambulance: South Western
- UK Parliament: North Cotswolds

Hazleton or Haselton is a village and civil parish in the Cotswold District of Gloucestershire, England. The population of the civil parish in the 2011 Census was 224. Hazleton was recorded in the Domesday Book (1086) as Hasedene.

Hazleton Abbey was formed in the 12th century. The former Abbey barn survives. Hazelton Manor was built on the site in the 16th century.

== See also ==
- Hazleton long barrows
