= Kingswood, Stroud District =

Village in Gloucestershire, England

Coordinates: 51°37′34″N 2°21′59″W

Kingswood
- Village
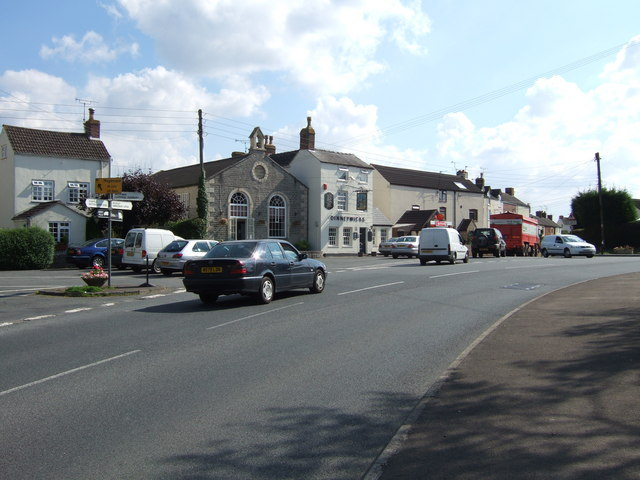
- The Chipping, Kingswood

- Location within Gloucestershire
- Population: 1,395 (2011 Census)
- OS grid reference: ST746920
- District: Stroud
- Shire county: Gloucestershire
- Region: South West
- Country: England
- Sovereign state: United Kingdom
- Post town: WOTTON-UNDER-EDGE
- Postcode district: GL12
- Dialling code: 01453
- Police: Gloucestershire
- Fire: Gloucestershire
- Ambulance: South Western
- UK Parliament: South Cotswolds

Kingswood is a town and civil parish within the Stroud district of Gloucestershire, England. It is southwest of Wotton-under-Edge and has a population of 1,290, increasing to 1,395 at the 2011 Census.

The village is located on the edge of the Cotswolds.

Kingswood was formerly a detached part of Wiltshire that was incorporated into Gloucestershire by the Counties (Detached Parts) Act 1844.

Kingswood Abbey was a Cistercian abbey on the northeast edge of the village. The abbey was founded in 1139 by William Berkeley, in accordance with the wishes of his uncle, Roger II of Berkeley, and colonised from the Cistercian house at Tintern. All that survives today is the 16th-century gatehouse, which is under the care of English Heritage, and Calcot Manor, a former tithe barn.

== Amenities ==
The village includes a pub, shop and gym which primarily serves the nearby town of Wotton.

== Governance ==
An electoral ward in the same name exists. This ward starts in west at Kingswood and stretches east to Alderley. The population of the ward taken at the 2011 census was 2,096.

== Notable people ==
John Lewis (1685–1761), antiquarian and diarist, was born and brought up here.
