= Alstone, Cheltenham =

Area of Cheltenham, Gloucestershire, England

Coordinates: 51.90280°N 2.09298°W

Alstone is a district of the English town of Cheltenham, in Gloucestershire, England.

Once a distinct village (it was listed in the Domesday Book with two mills on the River Chelt) and later informally called Alstone Spa as the result of the mineral waters there, Alstone was subsumed into the 19th-century expansion of the town of Cheltenham.
