= Calcot, Gloucestershire =

Coordinates: 51.789483°N 1.868775°W

Calcot
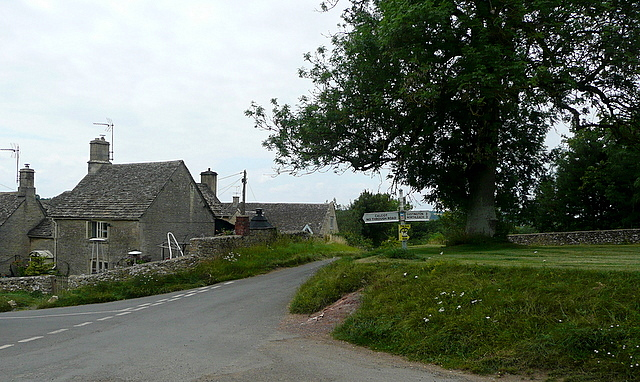
- Calcot crossroads

- Location within Gloucestershire
- OS grid reference: SP090101
- Civil parish: Coln St Dennis
- District: Cotswold
- Shire county: Gloucestershire
- Ceremonial county: Gloucestershire
- Region: South West
- Country: England
- Sovereign state: United Kingdom
- Police: Gloucestershire
- Fire: Gloucestershire
- Ambulance: South Western
- UK Parliament: North Cotswolds

Calcot is a settlement in the English county of Gloucestershire.

Calcot forms part of the civil parish of Coln St Dennis, within the Cotswold local government district.
