= Bournstream =

Hamlet in Gloucestershire, England

Coordinates: 51.64°N 02.37°W

- Location within Gloucestershire
- OS grid reference: ST7494
- District: Stroud
- Shire county: Gloucestershire
- Region: South West
- Country: England
- Sovereign state: United Kingdom
- Police: Gloucestershire
- Fire: Gloucestershire
- Ambulance: South Western

Bournstream is a hamlet located in Gloucestershire, England.
