= Grade II* listed buildings in Cotswold (district) =

There are over 20,000 Grade II* listed buildings in England. This page is a list of these buildings in the district of Cotswold in Gloucestershire.

== List of buildings ==
Name	Location	Type	Completed (Note: The date given is the date used by Historic England as significant for the initial building or that of an important part in the structure's description.)	Date designated	Grid ref. (Note: The grid reference is based on the British national grid reference system, sometimes known as OSGB36, used by the Ordnance Survey.) Geo-coordinates	Entry number (Note: The "List Entry Number" is a unique number assigned to each listed building and scheduled monument by Historic England.)	Image
Adlestrop Park	Adlestrop Park, Adlestrop	House	Mid-17th century	25 August 1960	SP2439426865; 51°56′23″N 1°38′48″W	1154355	Adlestrop Park More images
Monument with railings to Warren Hastings in the churchyard of the Church of St Peter c. 1 metre east of east end of chancel	Daylesford, Adlestrop	Commemorative monument	1818	30 January 1987	SP2431325892; 51°55′52″N 1°38′52″W	1089802	Monument with railings to Warren Hastings in the churchyard of the Church of St Peter c. 1 metre east of east end of chancel More images
Church of St Peter	Ampney St Peter	Church	Late Saxon	26 November 1958	SP0818601520; 51°42′44″N 1°52′59″W	1089929	Church of St Peter More images
Gates, gate piers and railings at former west entrance to Sandywell Park	Andoversford	Gate	18th century	11 February 1986	SP0088520192; 51°52′49″N 1°59′19″W	1089390	Gates, gate piers and railings at former west entrance to Sandywell Park More images
Sandywell Park	Andoversford	Country house	c.1704	23 January 1952	SP0138120255; 51°52′51″N 1°58′53″W	1341317	Upload Photo
Ashley Manor	Ashley	Farmhouse	15th century	6 September 1954	ST9313094708; 51°39′04″N 2°06′03″W	1089747	Upload Photo
Church of St James	Ashley	Church	Norman	6 September 1954	ST9317294712; 51°39′04″N 2°06′00″W	1341134	Church of St James More images
Church of St Andrew	Aston-sub-Edge	Anglican church	1797	25 August 1960	SP1383541628; 52°04′22″N 1°47′58″W	1341748	Church of St Andrew More images
Manor Farmhouse	Aston-sub-Edge	Farmhouse	16th century	25 August 1960	SP1390641644; 52°04′23″N 1°47′55″W	1341752	Manor Farmhouse More images
Church of St Mary	Barnsley	Anglican church	12th century	26 November 1958	SP0772905095; 51°44′40″N 1°53′22″W	1303501	Church of St Mary More images
Barnsley House	Barnsley	House	Late 17th century	4 June 1952	SP0767804929; 51°44′35″N 1°53′25″W	1341249	Barnsley House More images
Gothic summerhouse at Barnsley House	Barnsley	Summerhouse	c.1770	4 June 1952	SP0768504868; 51°44′33″N 1°53′24″W	1089497	Upload Photo
Church of St Mary	Barrington	Anglican church	Late 12th century	26 January 1961	SP2051813482; 51°49′11″N 1°42′13″W	1090369	Church of St Mary More images
Clairvoyée, gate and piers set within the eastern boundary wall of Barrington Park	Barrington Park, Barrington	Gate	18th century	23 January 1952	SP2066913952; 51°49′26″N 1°42′05″W	1090368	Clairvoyée, gate and piers set within the eastern boundary wall of Barrington Park More images
Dovecote c. 400 metres north of Barrington Park	Barrington Park, Barrington	Dovecote	18th century	28 May 1987	SP2023513936; 51°49′25″N 1°42′28″W	1340832	Dovecote c. 400 metres north of Barrington Park More images
Gate piers and flanking wall to Barrington Park Estate	Barrington	Gate piers	18th century	28 May 1987	SP1992412051; 51°48′24″N 1°42′45″W	1340829	Upload Photo
Gothic temple c. 230m south-west of Barrington Park House	Barrington Park, Barrington	Garden temple	Mid-18th century	28 May 1987	SP2014913477; 51°49′10″N 1°42′33″W	1340831	Upload Photo
Roman Doric temple circa 50m south of the walled garden	Barrington Park, Barrington	Garden temple	Mid-18th century	28 May 1987	SP2056013370; 51°49′07″N 1°42′11″W	1172331	Upload Photo
Batsford Park	Batsford Estate, Batsford	Manor house	1888–92	25 August 1960	SP1858033692; 52°00′05″N 1°43′51″W	1089576	Batsford Park More images
Church of St Mary	Batsford	Church	1861–62	25 August 1960	SP1869233890; 52°00′11″N 1°43′45″W	1341210	Church of St Mary More images
Church of St Mary Magdalene	Baunton	Anglican church	12th century	26 November 1958	SP0216904674; 51°44′27″N 1°58′12″W	1340878	Church of St Mary Magdalene More images
Barn approx. 50m west of Manor Farmhouse	Ablington, Bibury	Barn	Mid–late 16th century	23 January 1952	SP1041207669; 51°46′03″N 1°51′02″W	1155118	Barn approx. 50m west of Manor Farmhouse
Group of 6 monuments in the churchyard approx. 5m south of nave and west of porch to Church of St Mary	Bibury	Gravestone	17th/18th century	5 February 1987	SP1181006497; 51°45′25″N 1°49′49″W	1155814	Group of 6 monuments in the churchyard approx. 5m south of nave and west of porch to Church of St Mary More images
The Pigeon House	Bibury	House	Early 16th century	23 January 1952	SP1177706756; 51°45′34″N 1°49′51″W	1078800	Upload Photo
Elizabeth Pengree Memorial	Blockley	Commemorative monument	1770s	26 August 1983	SP1648234906; 52°00′44″N 1°45′41″W	1341728	Upload Photo
Norman Cottage Chapel	Aston Magna, Blockley	House	Later	26 August 1983	SP2012635707; 52°01′10″N 1°42′29″W	1153040	Upload Photo
Old Manor Cottages	Paxford, Blockley	House	17th century	25 August 1960	SP1861637826; 52°02′19″N 1°43′48″W	1341701	Upload Photo
Orangery	Northwick Park, Blockley	Orangery	Late 17th century	25 August 1960	SP1673536403; 52°01′33″N 1°45′27″W	1304221	Upload Photo
Parish Church of Saint Peter and Saint Paul	Blockley	Parish church	Late 12th century	25 August 1960	SP1646234920; 52°00′45″N 1°45′42″W	1153981	Parish Church of Saint Peter and Saint Paul More images
Paxford House	Paxford House, Blockley	House	1729	25 August 1960	SP1846037760; 52°02′17″N 1°43′56″W	1341721	Upload Photo
The Manor House	Blockley	Bishop's summer palace	Rebuilt before 1539	25 August 1960	SP1648034896; 52°00′44″N 1°45′41″W	1153475	The Manor House More images
Upton Wold House	Blockley	House	Late 17th century	25 August 1960	SP1635335032; 52°00′49″N 1°45′47″W	1088633	Upload Photo
Bourton House	Bourton-on-the-Hill	Manor house	Late 16th century	11 January 1985	SP1773632463; 51°59′25″N 1°44′35″W	1089559	Bourton House More images
Diamond Lodge	Sezincote Park, Bourton-on-the-Hill	Lodge	c.1805	25 August 1960	SP1759731640; 51°58′59″N 1°44′43″W	1305446	Diamond Lodge More images
Baines House	Bourton-on-the-Water	House	17th century	25 August 1960	SP1662020511; 51°52′58″N 1°45′36″W	1341627	Upload Photo
Harrington House	Bourton-on-the-Water	Country house	c.1730	25 August 1960	SP1666820586; 51°53′01″N 1°45′33″W	1171024	Harrington House More images
Screen walls and gate piers of Harrington House	Bourton-on-the-Water	Gate	c.1730	25 August 1960	SP1664720594; 51°53′01″N 1°45′34″W	1088747	Upload Photo
Church of St Lawrence	Bourton-on-the-Water	Church	14th century	25 August 1960	SP1669520863; 51°53′10″N 1°45′32″W	1170801	Church of St Lawrence More images
Gates and Gatepiers to the Church of St Lawrence	Bourton-on-the-Water	Gate	Late 19th century	12 August 1983	SP1666820840; 51°53′09″N 1°45′33″W	1088766	Gates and Gatepiers to the Church of St Lawrence
John Jordan bale tomb to south of church	Bourton-on-the-Water	Table tomb	1774	12 August 1983	SP1671020849; 51°53′09″N 1°45′31″W	1088767	Upload Photo
Sherborne Terrace	Bourton-on-the-Water	Terrace	Mid-17th century	25 August 1960	SP1662520601; 51°53′01″N 1°45′36″W	1341623	Sherborne Terrace
Boxwell Court	Boxwell, Boxwell with Leighterton	Country house	15th or 16th century	6 September 1954	ST8120792715; 51°37′59″N 2°16′23″W	1090042	Boxwell Court More images
Church of St Andrew	Leighterton, Boxwell with Leighterton	Parish church	13th century	6 September 1954	ST8237191073; 51°37′06″N 2°15′22″W	1154749	Church of St Andrew More images
Church of St Mary	Boxwell, Boxwell with Leighterton	Parish church	13th century	6 September 1954	ST8122692701; 51°37′58″N 2°16′22″W	1154676	Upload Photo
Group of 3 monuments in the churchyard approx. 2m south of Church of St Mary	Boxwell, Boxwell with Leighterton	Tomb	1751	1 May 1986	ST8123092687; 51°37′58″N 2°16′21″W	1090041	Upload Photo
Two connected barns east of Church Farmhouse	Leighterton, Boxwell with Leighterton	Dovecote	1733	6 September 1954	ST8236490957; 51°37′02″N 2°15′22″W	1341011	Two connected barns east of Church Farmhouse More images
Unidentified monument in the churchyard approximately 5 metres south-east of porch to Church of St Andrew	Leighterton, Boxwell with Leighterton	Tomb	1700	1 May 1986	ST8237391063; 51°37′05″N 2°15′22″W	1303672	Upload Photo
Church of St Paul	Broadwell	Church	12th century	25 August 1960	SP2004927701; 51°56′51″N 1°42′35″W	1089777	Church of St Paul More images
Row of 6 Chadwell monuments in the churchyard of the Church of St Paul c.2.5 metres south of east end of chancel	Broadwell	Chest tomb	Early 17th century	30 January 1987	SP2001127705; 51°56′51″N 1°42′37″W	1341113	Row of 6 Chadwell monuments in the churchyard of the Church of St Paul c.2.5 metres south of east end of chancel
The Manor House	Broadwell	Manor house	Rebuilt 1757	25 August 1960	SP2003827631; 51°56′49″N 1°42′36″W	1089783	The Manor House More images
Badger's Hall	Chipping Campden	House	Mid-17th century	25 August 1960	SP1512239143; 52°03′02″N 1°46′51″W	1342033	Badger's Hall More images
Bedfont House, Woodward House	Chipping Campden	Town house	c.1740	25 August 1960	SP1526539279; 52°03′06″N 1°46′44″W	1078416	Bedfont House, Woodward House
Campden House	Chipping Campden	Country house	1628	25 August 1960	SP1332237739; 52°02′16″N 1°48′26″W	1078464	Upload Photo
Court House	Chipping Campden	House	18th century	25 August 1960	SP1535639279; 52°03′06″N 1°46′39″W	1342016	Court House
Dovecote to north of Wool Barn	Westington, Chipping Campden	Dovecote	Late 17th or early 18th century	25 August 1960	SP1485638751; 52°02′49″N 1°47′05″W	1078360	Upload Photo
East Banqueting House of Old Campden House	Chipping Campden	Banqueting house	Between 1612 and 1627	25 August 1960	SP1554939350; 52°03′08″N 1°46′29″W	1341980	East Banqueting House of Old Campden House More images
Lodges, gates and archway to Old Campden Manor	Chipping Campden	Gate	c.1613	25 August 1960	SP1545539407; 52°03′10″N 1°46′34″W	1341979	Lodges, gates and archway to Old Campden Manor
Elm Tree House	Chipping Campden	House	1656	25 August 1960	SP1494439063; 52°02′59″N 1°47′01″W	1342011	Elm Tree House
High Barn	Broad Campden, Chipping Campden	House	Early 17th century	25 August 1960	SP1604437783; 52°02′18″N 1°46′03″W	1078485	Upload Photo
Island House and garden walls to east	Chipping Campden	House	16th century	25 August 1960	SP1500439094; 52°03′00″N 1°46′57″W	1342029	Upload Photo
Lloyds Bank and British Legion	Chipping Campden	Servicemens club	Early 18th century	25 August 1960	SP1523739241; 52°03′05″N 1°46′45″W	1342036	Upload Photo
Midland Bank	Chipping Campden	Building	Early 18th century	25 August 1960	SP1503139115; 52°03′01″N 1°46′56″W	1078399	Upload Photo
New Dover's House	Chipping Campden	Barn	18th century	4 July 1973	SP1524439422; 52°03′11″N 1°46′45″W	1078422	Upload Photo
Norman Chapel and boundary wall	Chipping Campden	Chapel	1905–07	25 August 1960	SP1576637794; 52°02′18″N 1°46′18″W	1341989	Norman Chapel and boundary wall
Stanford House	Chipping Campden	House	1705	25 August 1960	SP1529739408; 52°03′10″N 1°46′42″W	1341999	Upload Photo
The Martins	Chipping Campden	House	1660	25 August 1960	SP1513639188; 52°03′03″N 1°46′50″W	1078434	The Martins
The Old Silk Mill	Chipping Campden	Silk mill	18th century	8 June 1983	SP1495638977; 52°02′56″N 1°47′00″W	1342026	The Old Silk Mill More images
Tithe Barn to south of Campden House	Chipping Campden	Tithe barn	1628	25 August 1960	SP1332037675; 52°02′14″N 1°48′26″W	1078465	Upload Photo
Town Hall	Chipping Campden	Town hall	1897	25 August 1960	SP1508439144; 52°03′02″N 1°46′53″W	1078401	Town Hall More images
West Banqueting House to Old Campden House	Chipping Campden	Banqueting house	c.1627	25 August 1960	SP1543739324; 52°03′08″N 1°46′35″W	1078461	West Banqueting House to Old Campden House
Woolstaplers' House	Chipping Campden	House	Probably 14th/15th century	25 August 1960	SP1524639257; 52°03′05″N 1°46′45″W	1249083	Upload Photo
Church of St Peter	Stratton, Cirencester	Church	Early 12th century	14 June 1948	SP0099603964; 51°44′04″N 1°59′13″W	1187408	Church of St Peter More images
Church of the Holy Trinity	Cirencester	Church	1847–51	23 July 1971	SP0260701386; 51°42′40″N 1°57′49″W	1025128	Church of the Holy Trinity More images
Cirencester Park Mansion and attached offices	Cirencester	House	Late 16th century	14 June 1948	SP0202602037; 51°43′01″N 1°58′19″W	1280239	Cirencester Park Mansion and attached offices More images
Cirencester Park wall, gates, lodges and Corinium Museum of Roman Antiquities	Cirencester	Wall & museum	Early/mid-18th century	5 June 1969	SP0173501679; 51°42′50″N 1°58′35″W	1187523	Cirencester Park wall, gates, lodges and Corinium Museum of Roman Antiquities More images
Alfred's Hall at SO972031	Cirencester Park, Cirencester	Ruin	1721	14 June 1948	SO9720003100; 51°43′36″N 2°02′31″W	1298719	Alfred's Hall at SO972031 More images
Pope's Seat	Cirencester Park, Cirencester	Garden building	Early 18th century	14 June 1948	SO9992802376; 51°43′12″N 2°00′09″W	1204826	Pope's Seat More images
Queen Anne's Monument	Cirencester Park, Cirencester	Column	1741	23 July 1971	SP0061801769; 51°42′53″N 1°59′33″W	1187406	Queen Anne's Monument More images
Hexagon	Cirencester Park, Cirencester	Garden building	c.1736	14 June 1948	SP0130702235; 51°43′08″N 1°58′57″W	1187402	Hexagon More images
Ice house approx. 150m south-west of Cirencester Park Mansion	Cirencester Park, Cirencester	Icehouse	18th century	24 May 1993	SP0189701841; 51°42′55″N 1°58′26″W	1298720	Upload Photo
Ivy Lodge at SO990026 and attached farm buildings and wall	Cirencester Park, Cirencester	House	Early/mid-18th century	23 July 1971	SO9907602618; 51°43′20″N 2°00′53″W	1187404	Ivy Lodge at SO990026 and attached farm buildings and wall More images
Dollar Street House and attached steps, railing bases and ironwork	Cirencester	House	1725	14 June 1948	SP0217202296; 51°43′10″N 1°58′12″W	1280530	Dollar Street House and attached steps, railing bases and ironwork More images
Friends' Meeting House	Cirencester	House	Early 19th century	14 June 1948	SP0207702245; 51°43′08″N 1°58′17″W	1206705	Friends' Meeting House More images
Frontiers	Cirencester	Apartment	1694	14 June 1948	SP0209702379; 51°43′12″N 1°58′16″W	1205997	Frontiers More images
No 5, Cecily Hill and attached garden wall	Cirencester	House	Late 17th/early 18th century	14 June 1948	SP0195402102; 51°43′04″N 1°58′23″W	1205204	Upload Photo
Gosditch House	Cirencester	House	Early 18th century	14 June 1948	SP0225902116; 51°43′04″N 1°58′07″W	1187489	Gosditch House More images
Lloyd's Bank	Cirencester	Bank (financial)	c.1780	14 June 1948	SP0219101998; 51°43′00″N 1°58′11″W	1187425	Lloyd's Bank More images
Mead House	Cirencester	Villa	Mid-18th century	14 June 1948	SP0203902253; 51°43′08″N 1°58′19″W	1187529	Mead House More images
Obelisk at SP02130132	Cirencester	Obelisk	18th century	23 July 1971	SP0212801316; 51°42′38″N 1°58′14″W	1187413	Obelisk at SP02130132 More images
Powell's School	Cirencester	School	c.1714	14 June 1948	SP0211402354; 51°43′12″N 1°58′15″W	1280443	Powell's School More images
Sarcophagus approx. 18m east of north-east chapel of Church of St John the Baptist	Cirencester	Sarcophagus	1790	24 May 1993	SP0235802118; 51°43′04″N 1°58′02″W	1280234	Sarcophagus approx. 18m east of north-east chapel of Church of St John the Baptist More images
The Old Barracks	Cirencester	Barracks	1857	23 July 1971	SP0182702155; 51°43′05″N 1°58′30″W	1187434	The Old Barracks More images
The Old Grammar School and forecourt wall	Cirencester	House	1534–60	23 July 1971	SP0209801993; 51°43′00″N 1°58′16″W	1280218	Upload Photo
Weavers Hall	Cirencester	Almshouse	Late 15th century	14 June 1948	SP0212002295; 51°43′10″N 1°58′15″W	1187527	Weavers Hall More images
Woolgatherers and attached warehouse	Cirencester	House	Mid-/late 17th century	14 June 1948	SP0202502170; 51°43′06″N 1°58′20″W	1187448	Woolgatherers and attached warehouse More images
7 Cecily Hill	Cirencester	House	Early/mid-18th century	14 June 1948	SP0194502100; 51°43′03″N 1°58′24″W	1187430	Upload Photo
51 Coxwell Street	Cirencester	House	Late 17th/early 18th century	14 June 1948	SP0206802154; 51°43′05″N 1°58′17″W	1205625	Upload Photo
24, 26 and 28 Thomas Street	Cirencester	House	15th century	14 June 1948	SP0199702172; 51°43′06″N 1°58′21″W	1298660	24, 26 and 28 Thomas Street More images
9–17 Market Place	Cirencester	House	Mid-17th century	14 June 1948	SP0235102070; 51°43′02″N 1°58′03″W	1298687	9–17 Market Place More images
1 Querns Lane	Cirencester	House	17th century	15 September 2010	SP0239701690; 51°42′50″N 1°58′00″W	1393966	1 Querns Lane
22 Thomas Street	Cirencester	Villa	Mid-/late 18th century	14 June 1948	SP0200802191; 51°43′06″N 1°58′20″W	1280091	22 Thomas Street More images
7 Gloucester Street	Cirencester	House	Mid-/late 17th century	14 June 1948	SP0210102370; 51°43′12″N 1°58′16″W	1187470	7 Gloucester Street More images
2 Watermoor Road	Cirencester	House	Early 17th century	14 June 1948	SP0240801686; 51°42′50″N 1°58′00″W	1298592	Upload Photo
33 Gloucester Street	Cirencester	House	16th century	14 June 1948	SP0207002412; 51°43′14″N 1°58′17″W	1187474	33 Gloucester Street More images
3 Gosditch Street	Cirencester	House	Late 18th century	14 June 1948	SP0225202107; 51°43′04″N 1°58′08″W	1206144	3 Gosditch Street More images
105 and 105b Gloucester Street	Cirencester	House	1695	14 June 1948	SP0197102518; 51°43′17″N 1°58′22″W	1280387	105 and 105b Gloucester Street More images
Church of St. James	Clapton on the Hill	Anglican church	Late 12th century	25 August 1960	SP1628217969; 51°51′36″N 1°45′54″W	1154435	Church of St. James More images
Church of St Matthew	Coates	Anglican church	13th century	26 November 1958	SO9726301005; 51°42′28″N 2°02′28″W	1089306	Church of St Matthew More images
Sapperton Canal Tunnel (South Entrance) on former Thames and Severn Canal	Thames and Severn Canal, Coates	Tunnel	1789	4 June 1952	SO9661300600; 51°42′15″N 2°03′01″W	1089301	Sapperton Canal Tunnel (South Entrance) on former Thames and Severn Canal More images
Church of St Giles	Coberley	Church	12th century origins	4 July 1960	SO9656115829; 51°50′28″N 2°03′05″W	1091770	Church of St Giles More images
Church of St John the Baptist	Coln St. Aldwyns	Parish church	Late 12th century	26 January 1961	SP1435305156; 51°44′42″N 1°47′37″W	1089209	Church of St John the Baptist More images
Chest tomb c.15 metres south of north aisle in the churchyard of the Church of St Oswald	Compton Abdale	Chest tomb	14th century	18 June 1986	SP0595116592; 51°50′52″N 1°54′54″W	1341080	Upload Photo
Church of St Oswald	Compton Abdale	Anglican church	13th century	26 January 1961	SP0593616584; 51°50′52″N 1°54′55″W	1304301	Church of St Oswald More images
Church of St Nicholas	Condicote	Anglican church	Late 12th century	25 August 1960	SP1516228335; 51°57′12″N 1°46′51″W	1089911	Church of St Nicholas More images
Church of St Mary	Cowley	Church	c.1200	4 July 1960	SO9650514647; 51°49′50″N 2°03′08″W	1340154	Church of St Mary More images
Robert Briggs Monument in the churchyard of the Church of St Mary	Cowley	Chest tomb	1709	22 October 1987	SO9652014645; 51°49′49″N 2°03′07″W	1091738	Robert Briggs Monument in the churchyard of the Church of St Mary
Dovecote c.50 metres north-west of Daglingworth Manor	Daglingworth	Dovecote	Medieval	4 February 1952	SO9964604786; 51°44′30″N 2°00′24″W	1340925	Upload Photo
Thomas Heines Monument in the churchyard of the Church of the Holy Rood, c.12 metres south of the chancel	Daglingworth	Chest tomb	1683	12 February 1988	SO9935304973; 51°44′36″N 2°00′39″W	1153415	Upload Photo
Church of St Arild	Oldbury-on-the-Hill, Didmarton	Church	Mostly late 15th/early 16th century	6 September 1954	ST8187488223; 51°35′33″N 2°15′47″W	1089732	Church of St Arild More images
The Manor House/Dowdeswell Place	Dowdeswell	Manor house	Late 16th–early 17th century	23 January 1952	SP0052819172; 51°52′16″N 1°59′37″W	1089365	The Manor House/Dowdeswell Place
Gate piers and wall in front of the Manor House	Dowdeswell	Gate pier	17th century	11 February 1986	SP0054619189; 51°52′17″N 1°59′37″W	1155154	Gate piers and wall in front of the Manor House
The Eight Gabled House	Dowdeswell	House	Late 16th century	23 January 1952	SP0009519883; 51°52′39″N 2°00′00″W	1154697	Upload Photo
Church of St Mary	Driffield	Church	Norman	26 November 1958	SU0746399767; 51°41′48″N 1°53′36″W	1341377	Church of St Mary More images
Church of St Michael	Harnhill, Driffield	Church	Norman foundation	26 November 1958	SP0694200452; 51°42′10″N 1°54′03″W	1153265	Church of St Michael More images
Church of St Peter	Duntisbourne Abbots	Parish church	12th century	26 November 1958	SO9708007896; 51°46′11″N 2°02′37″W	1305556	Church of St Peter More images
Cotswold Farmhouse	Duntisbourne Abbots	Farmhouse	17th century	4 June 1952	SO9810709386; 51°46′59″N 2°01′44″W	1341789	Upload Photo
Nutbeam Farmhouse	Duntisbourne Leer, Duntisbourne Abbots	Farmhouse	15th century	4 June 1952	SO9799407482; 51°45′58″N 2°01′50″W	1088470	Upload Photo
Pinbury Park	Duntisbourne Rouse	House	15th century or earlier	4 June 1952	SO9553104948; 51°44′36″N 2°03′58″W	1088428	Pinbury Park More images
Charingworth Manor	Charingworth, Ebrington	Manor house	Early 17th century	20 February 1985	SP1979939643; 52°03′17″N 1°42′46″W	1341756	Charingworth Manor
Gate piers and walls at end of drive to Ebrington Manor	Ebrington	Gate pier	Late 17th/early 18th century	20 February 1985	SP1825740118; 52°03′33″N 1°44′06″W	1088546	Gate piers and walls at end of drive to Ebrington Manor
Summerhouse in grounds of Ebrington Manor	Ebrington	House	Late 17th/early 18th century	25 August 1960	SP1821139794; 52°03′22″N 1°44′09″W	1170833	Summerhouse in grounds of Ebrington Manor
Harrowby House	Ebrington	House	13th–17th century	25 August 1960	SP1837640039; 52°03′30″N 1°44′00″W	1088517	Upload Photo
Edgeworth Manor	Edgeworth	Country house	1685	4 June 1952	SO9489805920; 51°45′07″N 2°04′31″W	1341782	Edgeworth Manor More images
Unidentified monument in the churchyard approx. 1.5m south of Church of St John	Elkstone	Chest tomb	1692	24 June 1985	SO9670712290; 51°48′33″N 2°02′57″W	1088445	Upload Photo
Church of St Edward	Evenlode	Church	12th century	25 August 1960	SP2206229068; 51°57′35″N 1°40′49″W	1089794	Church of St Edward More images
3 Morean (possibly Morgan) Monuments immediately adjoining south-east corner of church in churchyard of Church of St Mary	Fairford	Chest tomb	Mid-18th century	17 June 1986	SP1517201164; 51°42′32″N 1°46′55″W	1341028	3 Morean (possibly Morgan) Monuments immediately adjoining south-east corner of church in churchyard of Church of St Mary
Dovecote in former Park Farm yard	Fairford	Dovecote	Medieval	4 June 1986	SP1537701202; 51°42′34″N 1°46′44″W	1089954	Upload Photo
Valentine Strong monument, about 11m south-west of south porch in St Mary's churchyard	Fairford	Table tomb	1662	17 June 1986	SP1514101140; 51°42′32″N 1°46′56″W	1305142	Upload Photo
Unidentified monument, about 3m east of Valentine Strong monument in St Mary's churchyard	Fairford	Chest tomb	15th century	17 June 1986	SP1515001145; 51°42′32″N 1°46′56″W	1090001	Upload Photo
Church of St John the Baptist	Great Rissington	Anglican church	12th century	25 August 1960	SP1951817152; 51°51′09″N 1°43′05″W	1152803	Church of St John the Baptist More images
Church of St Michael	Guiting Power	Church	12th century	25 June 1980	SP0956124536; 51°55′09″N 1°51′45″W	1089532	Church of St Michael More images
Church of St Nicholas	Hatherop	Anglican church	1854–55	26 November 1958	SP1538405095; 51°44′40″N 1°46′43″W	1089446	Church of St Nicholas More images
Church of All Saints	Salperton Park, Hazleton	Anglican church	12th century	26 January 1961	SP0769519841; 51°52′38″N 1°53′23″W	1089851	Church of All Saints More images
Church of St Andrew	Hazleton	Anglican church	12th century	26 January 1961	SP0796218229; 51°51′45″N 1°53′09″W	1153706	Church of St Andrew More images
Church of St John the Baptist	Kingscote	Parish church	Early English	6 September 1954	ST8184496217; 51°39′52″N 2°15′50″W	1089708	Church of St John the Baptist More images
Church of St Peter	Little Rissington	Anglican church	12th century	25 August 1960	SP1894319976; 51°52′41″N 1°43′34″W	1090280	Church of St Peter More images
Church of St Mary	Lower Slaughter	Church	Late 12th or early 13th century arcade	25 August 1960	SP1657822616; 51°54′07″N 1°45′38″W	1089920	Church of St Mary More images
Dovecote at the Manor House	Lower Slaughter	Dovecote	Late 16th century	16 July 1986	SP1660822648; 51°54′08″N 1°45′36″W	1341062	Upload Photo
Church of St Mary the Virgin	Meysey Hampton	Church	13th century	26 November 1958	SP1170600060; 51°41′57″N 1°49′55″W	1156083	Church of St Mary the Virgin More images
Villars Farmhouse	Meysey Hampton	Farmhouse	Late 14th century	4 June 1952	SU1188199826; 51°41′49″N 1°49′46″W	1156064	Villars Farmhouse More images
Lemington House and boundary wall to east and railings to north	Moreton-in-Marsh	House	Mid–late 17th century	5 March 1981	SP2053832418; 51°59′23″N 1°42′08″W	1341717	Lemington House and boundary wall to east and railings to north
The Steps and the premises of Horne and Sons and The Gateway	Moreton-in-Marsh	Town house	Mid-18th century	25 August 1960	SP2048032341; 51°59′21″N 1°42′11″W	1088654	The Steps and the premises of Horne and Sons and The Gateway More images
Cromwell House	Naunton	Gabled house	16th century	25 August 1960	SP1200923494; 51°54′35″N 1°49′37″W	1341072	Cromwell House
Dale House	Naunton	House	17th century	25 August 1960	SP1136423322; 51°54′30″N 1°50′10″W	1155063	Upload Photo
Dovecote south-west of Manor House	Naunton	Dovecote	Probably 16th century or earlier	25 August 1960	SP1158723369; 51°54′31″N 1°49′59″W	1155655	Dovecote south-west of Manor House More images
St Andrew's Parish Church	Naunton	Parish church	13th century	25 August 1960	SP1122023419; 51°54′33″N 1°50′18″W	1089861	St Andrew's Parish Church More images
Cross shaft and cross shaft base c.40m south of No 59	Calmsden, North Cerney	Cross	15th century	26 November 1958	SP0454308631; 51°46′35″N 1°56′08″W	1340930	Cross shaft and cross shaft base c.40m south of No 59 More images
Dovecote c.20m south of Eastington Manor	Eastington	Dovecote	15th century	23 January 1952	SP1262513821; 51°49′22″N 1°49′06″W	1303532	Dovecote c.20m south of Eastington Manor More images
Eastington Manor	Eastington, Northleach with Eastington	Manor house	15th century	23 January 1952	SP1262113856; 51°49′23″N 1°49′06″W	1090475	Eastington Manor
Monument in churchyard of Church of St Peter and St Paul, c.4.5m south of south aisle	Northleach, Northleach with Eastington	Chest tomb	17th century	25 March 1987	SP1119514547; 51°49′46″N 1°50′20″W	1090446	Monument in churchyard of Church of St Peter and St Paul, c.4.5m south of south aisle
The Old Prison, formerly Northleach House of Correction	Northleach with Eastington	House of correction	1792	23 January 1952	SP1089514949; 51°49′59″N 1°50′36″W	1090470	The Old Prison, formerly Northleach House of Correction More images
Margaret Parsons monument in the churchyard of the Church of St Nicholas c.4m east of chancel	Lower Oddington, Oddington	Chest tomb	1695	30 January 1987	SP2350325556; 51°55′41″N 1°39′35″W	1155286	Margaret Parsons monument in the churchyard of the Church of St Nicholas c.4m east of chancel
Oddington House	Lower Oddington, Oddington	Country house	17th century	25 August 1960	SP2332625903; 51°55′52″N 1°39′44″W	1341130	Oddington House More images
Church of St Nicholas	Ozleworth	Church	Mid-12th century	6 September 1954	ST7942593288; 51°38′17″N 2°17′55″W	1265165	Church of St Nicholas More images
Ozleworth Park	Ozleworth	Country house	Early 18th century	6 September 1954	ST7936793302; 51°38′17″N 2°17′58″W	1235221	Ozleworth Park More images
Church of All Saints	Preston	Church	13th century	26 November 1958	SP0440500893; 51°42′24″N 1°56′16″W	1089268	Church of All Saints More images
Rendcomb College	Rendcomb	Country house	1863–65	21 July 1980	SP0172809866; 51°47′15″N 1°58′35″W	1303962	Rendcomb College More images
Church of St Peter	Rodmarton	Anglican church	13th and 14th century	26 November 1958	ST9427398053; 51°40′52″N 2°05′03″W	1089236	Church of St Peter More images
Hazleton Manor Farmhouse	Hazleton, Rodmarton	Farmhouse	16th century	4 June 1952	ST9301998317; 51°41′01″N 2°06′09″W	1341398	Hazleton Manor Farmhouse More images
Baldwin Memorial, about 8 metres south-east of south transept in churchyard of Church of St Kenelm	Sapperton	Chest tomb	1677	21 March 1985	SO9474903394; 51°43′45″N 2°04′39″W	1089679	Baldwin Memorial, about 8 metres south-east of south transept in churchyard of Church of St Kenelm
Bridge above Snake Pool in gardens of Sezincote House	Sezincote Park, Sezincote	Bridge	1800–05	25 August 1960	SP1716031221; 51°58′45″N 1°45′06″W	1341253	Bridge above Snake Pool in gardens of Sezincote House More images
Clock tower, Home Farm, Sezincote Estate	Sezincote	Storehouse	1800–05	11 January 1985	SP1716030944; 51°58′36″N 1°45′06″W	1089506	Upload Photo
Home Farm House and attached farm buildings, Sezincote Estate	Sezincote	Farmhouse	1800–05	25 August 1960	SP1720130919; 51°58′35″N 1°45′04″W	1089504	Upload Photo
Cheltenham Lodges including gates, gate piers and adjoining walls	Sherborne	Gate	Mid-19th century	25 March 1987	SP1619113821; 51°49′22″N 1°45′59″W	1090430	Cheltenham Lodges including gates, gate piers and adjoining walls More images
Church of St Mary Magdalene, adjoining Sherborne House	Sherborne	Anglican church	Mid-19th century	26 January 1961	SP1689414729; 51°49′51″N 1°45′22″W	1303082	Church of St Mary Magdalene, adjoining Sherborne House More images
Sherborne House	Sherborne	Country house	c.1552	23 January 1952	SP1688914701; 51°49′50″N 1°45′23″W	1090436	Sherborne House More images
Barn, stable block, granary/smithy and kennel, c. 40m west of Shipton Sollars	Shipton Sollars, Shipton	Stable	19th century	23 January 1952	SP0314818479; 51°51′54″N 1°57′20″W	1341359	Upload Photo
Outbuilding immediately north of and attached to North Farm	Shipton Oliffe, Shipton	Dairy	16th century	23 January 1952	SP0402518932; 51°52′08″N 1°56′35″W	1089309	Upload Photo
Church of St John the Baptist	Shipton Moyne	Anglican church	1864–65	6 September 1954	ST8922189617; 51°36′19″N 2°09′25″W	1235759	Church of St John the Baptist More images
Church of St Peter	Siddington	Church	Norman	26 November 1958	SP0347200186; 51°42′01″N 1°57′04″W	1340986	Church of St Peter More images
Two adjoining barns at Church Farm	Siddington	Barn	Late 18th century	4 June 1952	SP0344400160; 51°42′01″N 1°57′06″W	1090073	Upload Photo
Church of All Saints	Somerford Keynes	Church	Early 13th century	26 November 1958	SU0165495524; 51°39′31″N 1°58′39″W	1153987	Church of All Saints More images
Church of All Saints	Shorncote, Somerford Keynes	Church	Norman	26 November 1958	SU0253296724; 51°40′09″N 1°57′53″W	1153975	Church of All Saints More images
Southrop Manor	Southrop	Manor house	12th century	23 January 1952	SP2023103447; 51°43′46″N 1°42′31″W	1156690	Upload Photo
Masonic Hall	Stow-on-the-Wold	Grammar school	1594	25 August 1960	SP1909525722; 51°55′47″N 1°43′25″W	1078374	Masonic Hall More images
The King's Arms Hotel, with Camilla	Stow-on-the-Wold	House	Early 17th century	25 August 1960	SP1919625757; 51°55′48″N 1°43′20″W	1088796	The King's Arms Hotel, with Camilla More images
The Royalist Hotel	Stow-on-the-Wold	House	16th century	25 August 1960	SP1929225692; 51°55′46″N 1°43′15″W	1170376	The Royalist Hotel More images
Church of St Mary	Lower Swell	Church		25 August 1960	SP1739825699; 51°55′46″N 1°44′54″W	1274872	Church of St Mary More images
Manor House	Swell	Manor house	Early–mid-17th century	25 August 1960	SP1765826859; 51°56′24″N 1°44′40″W	1221816	Upload Photo
Pineapple Spa, Spa Cottages	Lower Swell, Swell	House	c.1807	25 August 1960	SP1793925730; 51°55′47″N 1°44′26″W	1303139	Upload Photo
Syde Manor	Syde	Country house	Late 15th or early 16th century	24 June 1985	SO9491410781; 51°47′44″N 2°04′31″W	1341784	Upload Photo
Church of St Saviour	Tetbury	Church	1848	18 April 1973	ST8877693261; 51°38′17″N 2°09′49″W	1154438	Church of St Saviour More images
Unidentified memorial, about 1 metre north-west of north-east path at 11 metres from crossing in churchyard of Church of St Mary	Tetbury	Chest tomb	Mid-18th century	21 March 1985	ST8905492994; 51°38′08″N 2°09′34″W	1341195	Unidentified memorial, about 1 metre north-west of north-east path at 11 metres from crossing in churchyard of Church of St Mary
Unidentified memorial, about 1m west of path crossing in churchyard of Church of St Mary	Tetbury	Chest tomb	Mid-18th century	21 March 1985	ST8903592981; 51°38′08″N 2°09′35″W	1153413	Unidentified memorial, about 1m west of path crossing in churchyard of Church of St Mary More images
Unidentified memorial, about 14m south of north-west gate in churchyard of Church of St Mary	Tetbury	Sarcophagus	Mid-18th century	21 March 1985	ST8902092995; 51°38′08″N 2°09′36″W	1153440	Unidentified memorial, about 14m south of north-west gate in churchyard of Church of St Mary More images
Upton House	Tetbury Upton	Country house	1752	6 September 1954	ST8807895288; 51°39′23″N 2°10′25″W	1155320	Upload Photo
Lower Dean Manor	Turkdean	Manor house	c.1500	23 January 1952	SP1037217304; 51°51′15″N 1°51′03″W	1089818	Upload Photo
Rectory Farmhouse	Turkdean	Farmhouse	14th–15th century	23 January 1952	SP1075617387; 51°51′18″N 1°50′43″W	1089824	Upload Photo
Church of St Peter	Upper Slaughter	Parish church	12th century	25 August 1960	SP1547923229; 51°54′27″N 1°46′35″W	1237720	Church of St Peter More images
Eyford Park	Upper Slaughter	Country house	1910	25 August 1960	SP1466424649; 51°55′13″N 1°47′17″W	1222480	Eyford Park More images
Home Farmhouse	Upper Slaughter	Farmhouse	c.1700	16 July 1986	SP1553423243; 51°54′27″N 1°46′32″W	1237962	Home Farmhouse
Church of St Lawrence	Weston-sub-Edge	Parish church	13th century	25 August 1960	SP1281740585; 52°03′49″N 1°48′52″W	1171337	Church of St Lawrence More images
Manor House	Weston Subedge	Manor house	Late 17th century	25 August 1960	SP1261441149; 52°04′07″N 1°49′03″W	1341774	Manor House
Italian garden about 100m south-east of Westonbirt House, including camellia house to north	Westonbirt with Lasborough	Camellia house	1843	16 March 1987	ST8660689600; 51°36′18″N 2°11′41″W	1235738	Italian garden about 100m south-east of Westonbirt House, including camellia house to north More images
Lasborough Manor	Lasborough, Westonbirt with Lasborough	Farmhouse	c.1610	6 September 1954	ST8212194159; 51°38′45″N 2°15′35″W	1235928	Lasborough Manor More images
Church of St Bartholomew	Whittington	Parish church	12th century	26 January 1961	SP0132120643; 51°53′04″N 1°58′56″W	1341364	Church of St Bartholomew More images
Syreford Mill	Whittington	Mill house	17th century	11 February 1986	SP0270820273; 51°52′52″N 1°57′43″W	1155809	Syreford Mill
Five monuments, incl. Annathe Newman Monument, in the churchyard of the Church of St Peter, c. 4.5m north of the tower	Windrush	Gravestone	1606	25 March 1987	SP1931513040; 51°48′56″N 1°43′16″W	1157115	Five monuments, incl. Annathe Newman Monument, in the churchyard of the Church of St Peter, c. 4.5m north of the tower More images
William Trinder Monument and monuments either side, in the churchyard of the Church of St Peter	Windrush	Gravestone	18th century	25 March 1987	SP1932313029; 51°48′56″N 1°43′16″W	1090417	William Trinder Monument and monuments either side, in the churchyard of the Church of St Peter
Windrush Mill	Windrush	Mill house	Mid-17th–early 18th century	23 January 1952	SP1921613533; 51°49′12″N 1°43′21″W	1157066	Windrush Mill More images
Church of St Michael	Winson	Parish church	12th century	26 January 1961	SP0907008642; 51°46′35″N 1°52′12″W	1089174	Church of St Michael More images
Group of 9 mainly Howse and Bridges family monuments in the churchyard approximately 6 metres south of porch to Church of St Michael	Winson	Tomb	1756	5 February 1987	SP0906908628; 51°46′34″N 1°52′12″W	1341406	Upload Photo
Winson Manor	Winson	Country house	c.1740	23 January 1952	SP0908308680; 51°46′36″N 1°52′11″W	1156875	Winson Manor More images
Halewell Close	Withington	House	17th–early 18th century	23 January 1952	SP0302815381; 51°50′13″N 1°57′27″W	1341349	Upload Photo
The Old Rectory	Withington	Bishops palace	14th century	23 January 1952	SP0315615621; 51°50′21″N 1°57′20″W	1302905	The Old Rectory
Church of St Michael	Yanworth	Anglican church	12th century	26 January 1961	SP0792413881; 51°49′25″N 1°53′11″W	1089831	Church of St Michael More images
Stowell Park	Yanworth	House	c.1600	23 January 1952	SP0870513020; 51°48′57″N 1°52′30″W	1089828	Stowell Park More images

== See also ==
- Grade II* listed buildings in Gloucestershire
  - Grade II* listed buildings in Cheltenham
  - Grade II* listed buildings in Forest of Dean
  - Grade II* listed buildings in Gloucester
  - Grade II* listed buildings in South Gloucestershire
  - Grade II* listed buildings in Stroud (district)
  - Grade II* listed buildings in Tewkesbury (borough)
- Grade I listed buildings in Cotswold (district)
