= Hawling =

Village in Gloucestershire, England

Coordinates: 51°54′N 1°54′W

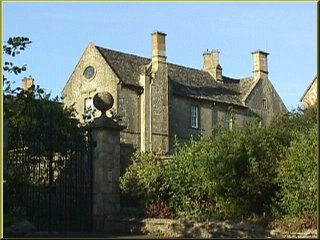

- Location within Gloucestershire
- Population: 224 (2011 Census)
- Civil parish: Hawling
- District: Tewkesbury
- Shire county: Gloucestershire
- Region: South West
- Country: England
- Sovereign state: United Kingdom
- Post town: Cheltenham
- Postcode district: GL54
- Police: Gloucestershire
- Fire: Gloucestershire
- Ambulance: South Western
- UK Parliament: Tewkesbury

Hawling is a small village and civil parish in the Cotswolds of England, close to Bourton-on-the-Water and Guiting Power. The Church, the Elizabethan manor house and the Rectory form a group of listed buildings. The population taken at the 2011 census was 224. Cheltenham is about ten miles away.

== Local features ==
There is a Church of England parish church and a Methodist church in the village.

The Church of St Edward dates from the early 13th century, with alterations in the 15th, 16th, 18th and late 19th centuries. There are a number of interesting brass and stone monuments inside. The building forms a group with the Manor House and the Rectory, which are also listed.

The Manor House dates back to the Elizabethan era, and Elizabeth I was rumoured to have stayed there. The Manor was the residence of Mrs Dent-Brocklehurst, the mother in law and grandmother of Sudeley Castle's current owners. She was the mother of Mark Dent-Brocklehurst. The Manor along with the Rectory, Manor Barn and many more are open every Red cross day for Gardens.

== Notable person ==
About 1646, the prolific writer and translator Clement Barksdale found refuge in Hawling from the English Civil War, taught at a private school there, and became Rector in 1650.
