= Lofty Large =

British writer and soldier

Donald Large
- Awaiting helicopter, Aden, 1966
- Born: 27 September 1930; Oxfordshire
- Died: 22 October 2006 (aged 76); Hereford
- Burial place: Hereford Cemetery
- Military career
- Allegiance: United Kingdom
- Branch: British Army
- Service years: 1946–1973
- Rank: Warrant Officer Class 2 Squadron Sergeant Major
- Nickname: Lofty
- Service number: 5577627
- Units: Wiltshire Regiment; Gloucestershire Regiment; Special Air Service
- Conflicts: Korean War; Malayan Emergency; Oman; Operation Claret; Aden Emergency
- Awards: Mention in Despatches; Presidential Unit Citation
- Other work: Author

Donald "Lofty" Large (27 September 1930 – 22 October 2006) was a British soldier and author.

Having joined the Army as a boy, Large fought in the Korean War and was wounded and taken prisoner at the Battle of Imjin. He spent two years in a prisoner-of-war camp, where his injuries went untreated and he lost more than a third of his body weight. After his release and rehabilitation, he joined the Special Air Service (SAS) and went on to serve in various conflicts around the world, hunting communist pro-independence guerrillas in Malaya, suppressing rebellions in Oman and Aden, and conducting deniable cross-border reconnaissance and raids during the Indonesia–Malaysia confrontation.

An imposing figure – he was almost 6 feet 6 inches (1.98 m) tall – he was given the nickname "Lofty" after joining the Army.

After his retirement, Large wrote two books about his Army career, preceding such authors as Andy McNab and Chris Ryan. Andy McNab has said that Large and his books were "instrumental in setting the template for future members of the [SAS] Regiment".

== Early life ==
Large was born in Oxfordshire, the first child of Joseph Large and his wife Emily (née Pratley). His sister, Janet, was nine years his junior. In 1939, the family moved to a cottage 2 miles (3 km) outside the village of Guiting Power in the Gloucestershire Cotswolds. As a child his father taught him how to shoot game; he later said of this experience, "little did I realise I would spend a lot of time, many years later [in the SAS], being trained in exactly that type of instinctive shooting".

Large would later dedicate his first book to "the best parents a man could ask for".

Growing up during the Second World War, and having watched British and American soldiers on field exercises in the Cotswold Hills, Large said that he had always wanted to be a soldier. He also joined the Army Cadet Force.

== Army career ==
Large joined the British Army as a "band boy" at the age of 15. Unable to join his county regiment (the Gloucestershire Regiment) because of a lack of vacancies, he instead joined the Wiltshire Regiment, with whom he served for five years in England, Germany and Hong Kong. During this time he was given the nickname "Lofty", having reached his adult height of 6 feet 5 3/4 inches (1.975m). In 1951, by requesting a transfer to the Gloucestershire Regiment, Large volunteered to fight in the Korean War. After a combat training course in Japan, he was deployed to the front line.

=== Korean War ===
In March 1951, along with half a dozen other newly badged Glosters, Large was sent to B Company's position in the low hills above the Imjin River. The Glosters, as part of the 29th Brigade, were defending routes through the valley that could potentially be used by the Chinese in a southbound offensive towards Seoul. On 22 April 1951, they engaged with Chinese troops in the Battle of Imjin. By the morning of 24 April, B Company had fought off seven assaults before they were able to rejoin the remainder of their battalion on what became known as Gloster Hill. By this time the battalion was vastly outnumbered, low on ammunition and cut off from United Nations lines. Large himself was shot in the left shoulder and, along with most of the remaining Glosters, was forced to surrender.

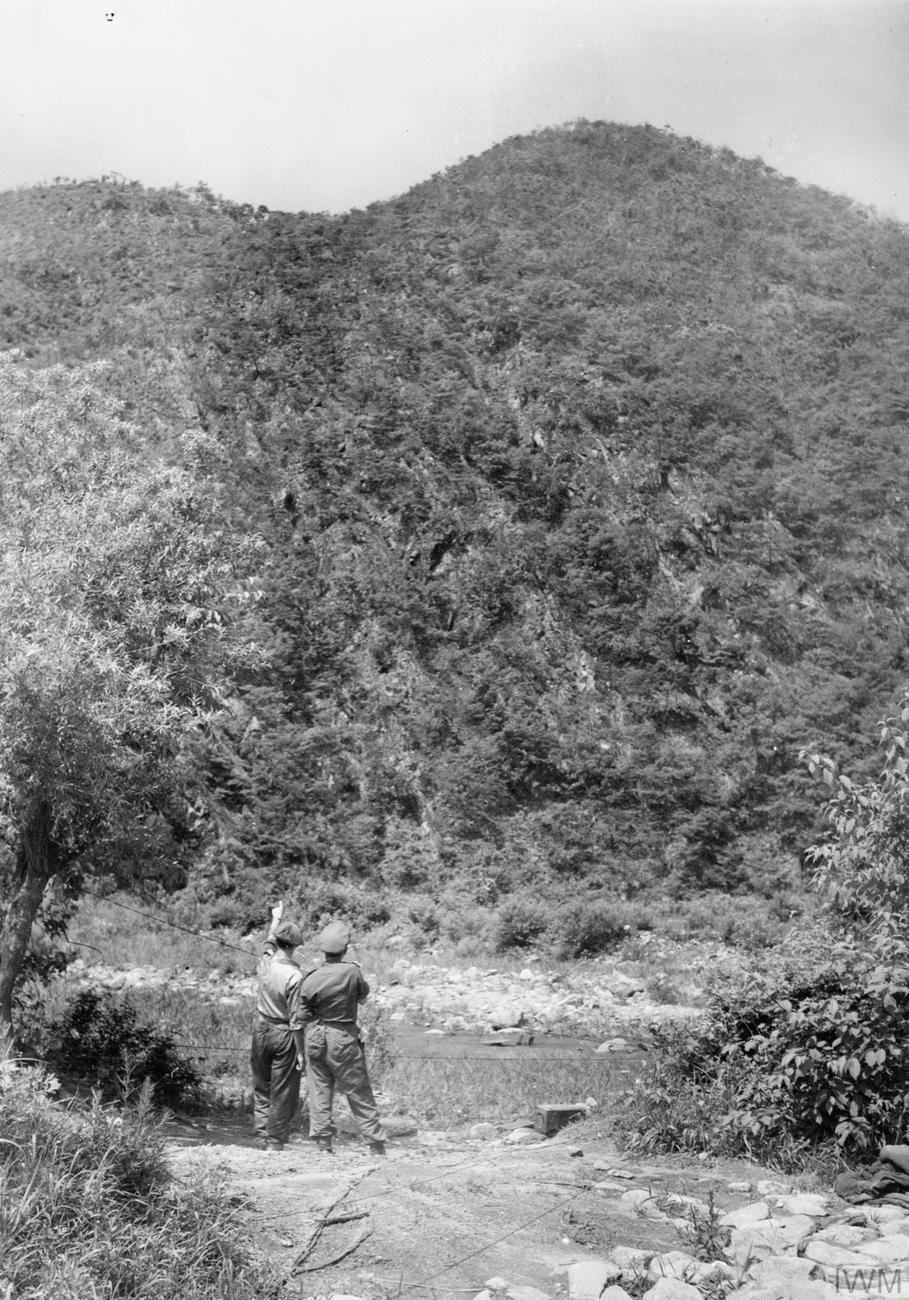
Gloster Hill five weeks after the Battle of Imjin.

After a 10-day forced march north, and having received only basic medical attention, Large arrived at a prison camp outside Chongsung, about 50 miles north east of Sinuiju. He spent two years in the camp and celebrated his 21st birthday there. Throughout his incarceration he had two bullets and at least 18 pieces of shrapnel embedded in his body. To help Large cope with the chronic pain of his untreated injuries, an American POW introduced him to marijuana, which grew wild in the area. Although he found it to be a highly effective – and enjoyable – painkiller, he was somewhat alarmed by its psychoactive effects and subsequently tried to limit his use of the drug. Like many of his fellow prisoners, Large also suffered from beri-beri and dysentery.

In March 1953, a Chinese doctor operated on Large and removed a tracer round from his ribs as a preliminary to his being released as part of an exchange of wounded prisoners. Having weighed 217 pounds (98 kg) in March 1951, he had dropped to 136 pounds (62 kg) by the time of his release. He also still had very limited movement in his atrophied and wasted left arm and was later told that if he had been treated by a British doctor at the time of his injury his arm would probably have been amputated.

Large was one of a batch of 22 exchanged British POWs whose release and subsequent return to Britain became front-page news: The Guardian newspaper reported that the group had been unaware of the death of King George VI (which had occurred over a year earlier), but were now looking forward to the coronation of Queen Elizabeth II. Interviewed after his release, Large described the war as "useless" and said that he believed the communist's claims that the US had engaged in germ warfare.

Presidential Unit Citation ribbon.

For its defence of Gloster Hill in the Battle of Imjin, the 1st Battalion, Gloucestershire Regiment was awarded the Presidential Unit Citation. The citation is conferred on units of the armed forces of the United States and of allied nations, and was awarded to the Glosters for "exceptionally outstanding performance of duty and extraordinary heroism in action against the armed enemy ... Every yard of ground they surrendered was covered with enemy dead, until the last gallant soldier of the fighting battalion was over-powered by the final surge of the enemy masses."

After returning to the UK, Large was offered a discharge on medical grounds, which he declined. He went on to serve briefly in the quartermaster's stores, as an instructor, and in the regimental police. Throughout this time he worked on regaining his fitness and rehabilitating his arm.

=== Special Air Service ===
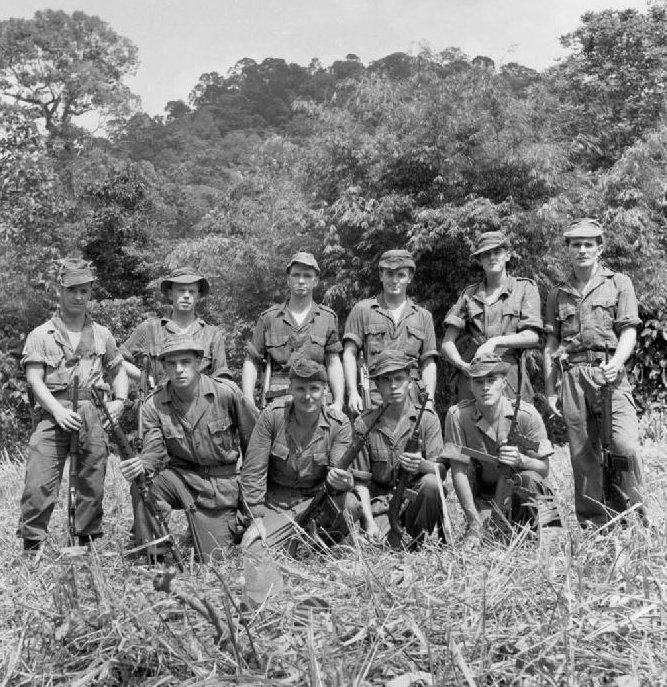
November 1957 photograph of a group of 22 SAS troops in Malaya during the Malayan Emergency

In 1957, wanting to escape the "stupidities of drill" and the "bullshit" of the regular Army, Large volunteered for the SAS; however, while riding home from the Brecon Beacons within hours of successfully completing the notoriously tough selection course, he crashed his motorbike, and, having injured his ankle, he had to repeat selection – this time with one boot two sizes larger than the other to accommodate the bandages and swelling. He went on to serve with 22 SAS in Malaya, Oman, Borneo and Aden.

Large's first operation with the SAS was in Malaya, hunting the pro-independence guerrillas of the Malayan National Liberation Army (MNLA) during the Malayan Emergency. By the time of Large's involvement there was little communist activity and, despite months of jungle patrols and encounters with leeches, scorpions, civet cats and tigers, he never had any contact with MNLA guerrillas.

While suppressing a rebellion in Oman in 1958, Large infamously lost his temper with a recalcitrant donkey. Recalling the incident in a 2003 interview, he said:

All the donkey handler did was laugh. Just as I turned round, the donkey's face was right by me and it shook its head and I stuck a punch in among it somewhere, and the donkey went down like it was shot ... much to my amazement. But not to as much amazement as the donkey handler's – I've never seen a bloke sober up so quick. It was a hole in one: the donkey struggled to its feet and looked really willing to go up the hill and the donkey handler lost his laugh.

Several weeks later, in January 1959, Large was part of the "A" and "D" Squadron assault on the Jebel Akhdar. This entailed a 2,500-metre (8,200 ft) overnight ascent of the south side of the jebel, with each soldier carrying up to 120 pounds (54 kg) of kit. Having completed the ascent the SAS were able to surprise and defeat the rebels, who had previously held the plateau as a virtually impregnable stronghold.

During the Indonesia–Malaysia confrontation in Borneo, Large took part in Operation Claret. As the leader of a four-man SAS patrol, he spent up to two weeks at a time hidden in the jungle on deniable incursions into Indonesia, performing reconnaissance or ambushing Indonesian forces. While hidden on the banks of the Sungei Koemba River during one of these incursions, Large and his patrol had the opportunity to assassinate Colonel Leonardus Moerdani, the commander of the Indonesian special forces in the area (and later Commander-in-Chief of the Indonesian Armed Forces and subsequently Indonesia's Minister of Defence and Security), who was passing by on a river boat. However, at the last moment Large spotted a woman on the boat. He later described the incident:

There could have been other women and there could have been children on the boat. And we don't do that sort of target, so ... it went. And it was in fact the very man we'd been looking for for three months: Colonel Moerdani of the Indonesian paracommando unit, and he was on the end of my rifle and I let him go – but ... you can't blat women and kids.

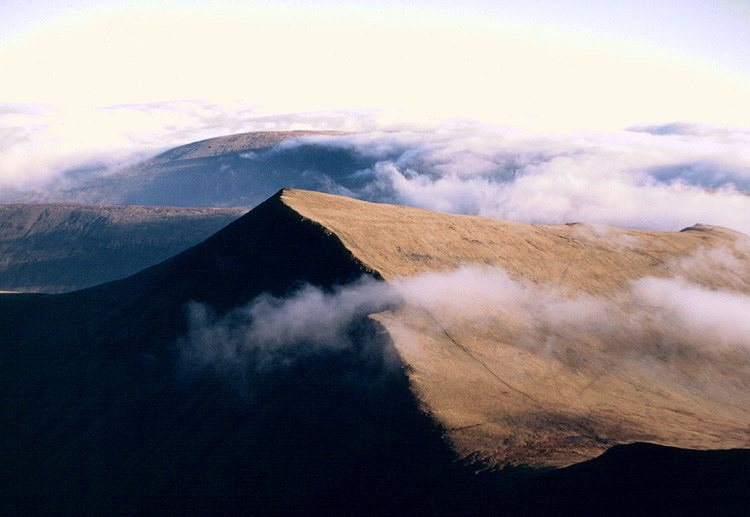
View of Cribyn from Pen Y Fan in The Brecon Beacons – location of the Fan Dance section of the SAS selection course.

For his service in Borneo, he was mentioned in despatches.

Parachuting was an important part of SAS training and operations, but it was not an experience that Large enjoyed: He suffered from a fear of heights and his considerable bulk meant that he descended far too quickly to have any chance of a comfortable landing. Despite this, he eventually qualified as a parachute instructor, although the footnote on his course report read, "not suited to parachuting – either in size or inclination."

In his memoirs Large recalls that the last shots he fired on active duty were warning shots. Fired at long range at the ground a few feet in front of a local woman (it is unclear where the incident took place), they were intended to dissuade her from heading into "certain danger". Despite firing increasingly close to the woman's feet, she continued forward, moving out of sight, only to reappear moments later leading the previously unseen bull which she had been intent on retrieving – "What a player! God help any poor son-in-law she might have."

Large spent the final years of his 27-year Army career as an instructor with 23 SAS Regiment (one of the SAS's two reserve regiments), eventually leaving the Army in 1973 as a Squadron Sergeant Major and Warrant Officer Class 2.

== Legacy ==
In his book SAS Heroes: Remarkable Soldiers, Extraordinary Men, former SAS soldier Pete Scholey describes Large as "simply the finest soldier [I] had ever met ... an inspiration to those around him ... with an admirable sense of fair play".

Andy McNab, who joined the SAS 11 years after Large's departure, has written about Large's enduring impact on the Regiment:

Being like Lofty was something I aspired to without realising it. When I joined the Regiment I was told that the best way to survive those first years in the Sabre squadron was to pick out someone who you thought you would like to be. Shut up, watch and listen. For me there were a number of the 'old and bold' who fitted that requirement. It wasn't until later in my service that I learned that most of them, as newly 'badged' members to a squadron, had picked Lofty.

A memorial bench was donated to the Allied Special Forces Memorial Grove at the National Memorial Arboretum by a group of Large's former SAS colleagues. The inscription reads:

THE SAS REGIMENT
The Oman Insurgencies 1958–1976
In Memory of WO2 Don "Lofty" Large, 22 SAS
Donated by his mates
Pete Scholey, Colin Wallace, Johnny Partridge, Pete Winner and Bob Podesta.
"We are the Pilgrims, master."

== Personal life ==
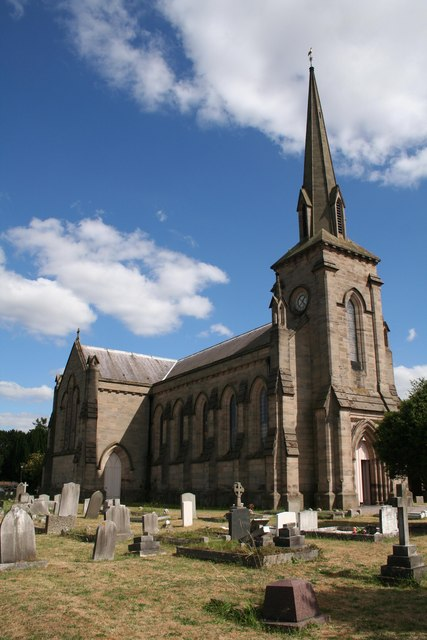
Large's funeral was held at St Martin's Church, Hereford.

Before leaving for Hong Kong with the Wiltshire Regiment in 1951, Large had met Ann, a nanny at the Regiment's depot in Devizes. She wrote to him five times a week during his captivity in Chongsung, although only about 90 of these letters were actually delivered to Large. They eventually married in 1955 and afterwards lived in an Army rental property on the top floor of a farmhouse in Longford, on the outskirts of Gloucester.

When Large volunteered for the SAS in 1957 it was not a unit that was well known outside of military circles – a fact that Large took advantage of by initially telling his wife that the Regiment's job was to air drop supplies to troops in the jungle.

In 1960 the couple moved with the Regiment to Hereford, where they later had two children, Andy and Donna.

== Later years ==
After leaving the Army Large worked in the UK and the Middle East. Having earned a heavy goods vehicle driving licence and a qualified testing officer's certificate during his time in the Army, he spent the last 14 years of his working life as a driving instructor.

He wrote two books about his time in the Army: One Man's SAS and One Man's War in Korea, and was one of the first non-commissioned officers (NCOs) to write about the SAS, preceding such soldiers-turned-authors as Andy McNab and Chris Ryan. A third book, Soldier Against the Odds: From Korean War to SAS, consisted of revised versions of his first two books together with some additional material. Andy McNab has said that "[Large's first two books] were recommended reading for Regiment candidates. He was instrumental in setting the template for future members of the Regiment."

In his seventies, Large, along with Pete Scholey, returned to the Borneo jungle as part of a 2003 Channel 4 documentary about the history of the SAS, taking the camera crew to the exact spot on the bank of the Sungei Koemba River where his patrol had successfully ambushed an Indonesian Army river boat in 1965.

Having been ill with leukaemia for three years, Large died aged 76 at St Michael's Hospice, Hereford. His funeral was held on 1 November 2006 at St Martin's Church (which has a long association with the SAS).
