= Edgeworth Manor =

Manor house in Edgeworth, Gloucestershire, England

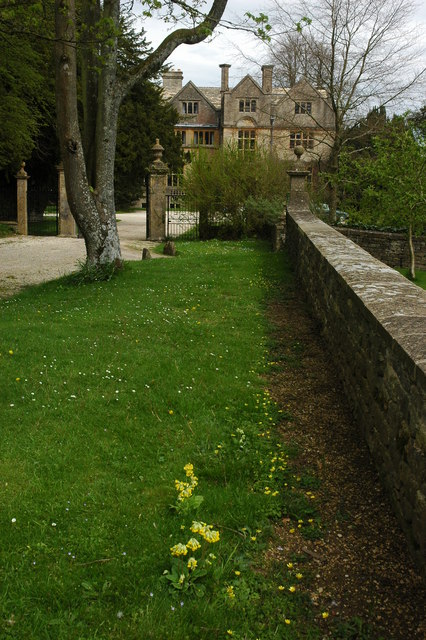
- Edgeworth Manor

- Location in Gloucestershire
- 51°45′07.2″N 02°04′31.08″W
- Location: Edgeworth, Gloucestershire, England

Edgeworth Manor is a Grade II* listed country house in Edgeworth, Gloucestershire, England. It was mentioned in the Domesday Book, when it was held by Roger de Lacy. Herman de Dreux, a Domesday baron, held Edgeworth manor by 1137 and was the first to use the de Edgeworth surname. The manor passed to William fitz Herman by 1157 and was held by the male descendants of Herman, in some part, until at least 1379 when the manor was sold by Christine Stevenes, niece of Stephen de Edgeworth, to Thomas Raleigh. The current house is mainly dated to 1685, when the previous Tudor house was replaced for Nathaniel Ridler. It underwent significant changes to south under Capel N. Tripp in 1882 and Sir Ernest George in 1899.
