= St Michael's and All Angels Church, Guiting Power =

Coordinates: 51.9192°N 1.8624°W

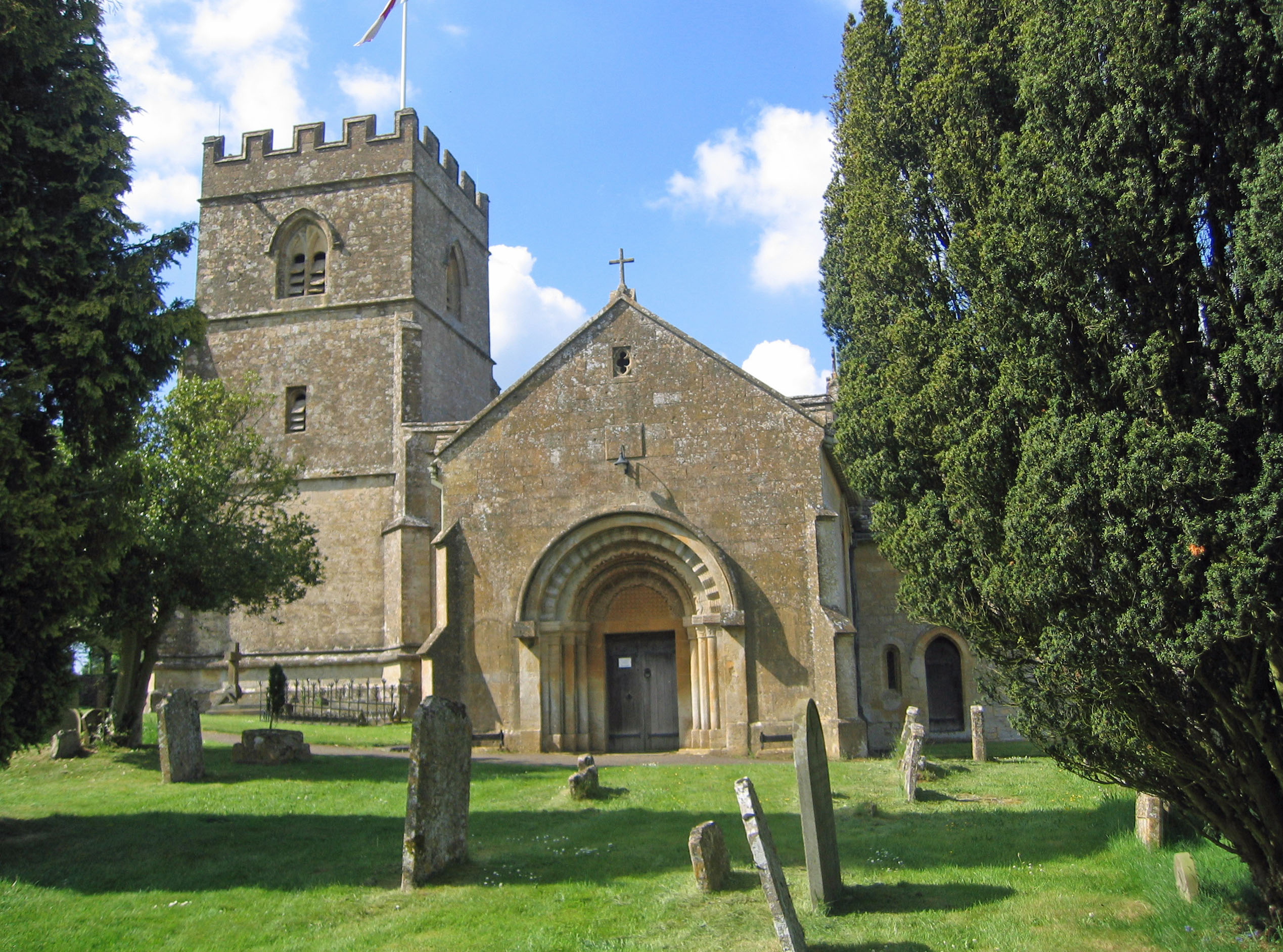
- St Michael's and All Angels Church from the south

- Location in Gloucestershire
- OS grid reference: SP 095 245
- Location: Guiting Power, Gloucestershire
- Country: England
- Denomination: Church of England
- Website: St Michael, Guiting Power

History
- Status: Parish church
- Dedication: St Michael and All Angels

Architecture
- Functional status: Active
- Heritage designation: Grade II*
- Designated: 25 June 1980
- Style: Norman, Early English, Perpendicular
- Groundbreaking: 12th century
- Completed: 1903

Specifications
- Materials: Limestone

Administration
- Province: Canterbury
- Diocese: Gloucester
- Archdeaconry: Cheltenham
- Deanery: Stow
- Parish: Guiting Power with Farmcote

St Michael's and All Angels Church is in the village of Guiting Power, Gloucestershire, England. It is an active Anglican parish church in the deanery of Stow, the archdeaconry of Cheltenham and the diocese of Gloucester. Its benefice is combined with those of St Faith, Farmcote, St Mary, Lower Slaughter, St Andrew, Naunton, St Mary, Temple Guiting, St James, Cutsdean, and St Peter, Upper Slaughter. The church contains fabric dating from the 12th century and is recorded in the National Heritage List for England as a designated Grade II* listed building. It formerly stood in the centre of the village, but the demolition of buildings since 1900 has left it standing at the village's southern end.

== History ==
The church dates from the 12th century but only two Norman doorways remain from this period. The chancel was added later in the 12th century. The tower was built in the 15th century and at this time the walls of the nave were raised. Following an increase in the population of the village in the 19th century, the church was expanded. In 1820 the north transept was added and in 1844 the south transept was built; at this time the southern Norman doorway was moved to the south end of the transept. The ring of five bells was either restored or replaced in 1869 and a sixth bell was added at this time. By the beginning of the 20th century the church had fallen into a state of disrepair and in 1903 it was restored. The roofs were renewed, and the organ chamber and vestry were added alongside the north transept. The chancel was completely rebuilt in its original design and stained glass windows were introduced. The organ was installed in 1978 and an additional stop was added in 1985.

== Architecture ==
=== Exterior ===
St Michael's is constructed in limestone with limestone slate roofs. Its plan is cruciform, consisting of a nave with north and south transepts, a west tower, and a chancel with a north vestry. The north and south doorways are Norman in style (the north doorway is blocked). The chancel is in Early English style and the tower is Perpendicular. The chancel contains lancet windows and a priest's door. The tower is in three stages, separated by string courses, and has diagonal buttresses; its parapet is embattled. The top stage contains a two-light, louvered bell opening on each side.

=== Interior ===
The font dates from the 15th century; it is octagonal with a quatrefoil on each side of the bowl. The pulpit was built in the 20th century in Caen stone and stands on stone from an earlier pulpit. The pews date from the 19th century. Over the south door is a royal coat of arms from the reign of George III. In the bellchamber are boards recording donations to the church. Behind the altar is a wooden plaque dated 1601 depicting Jesus carrying the cross. Four windows in the chancel contain stained glass by Heaton, Butler and Bayne. In the church are a number of carved stones, and a small sarcophagus from the Saxon era; this is considered to be one of the smallest sarcophagi in England.

== External features ==
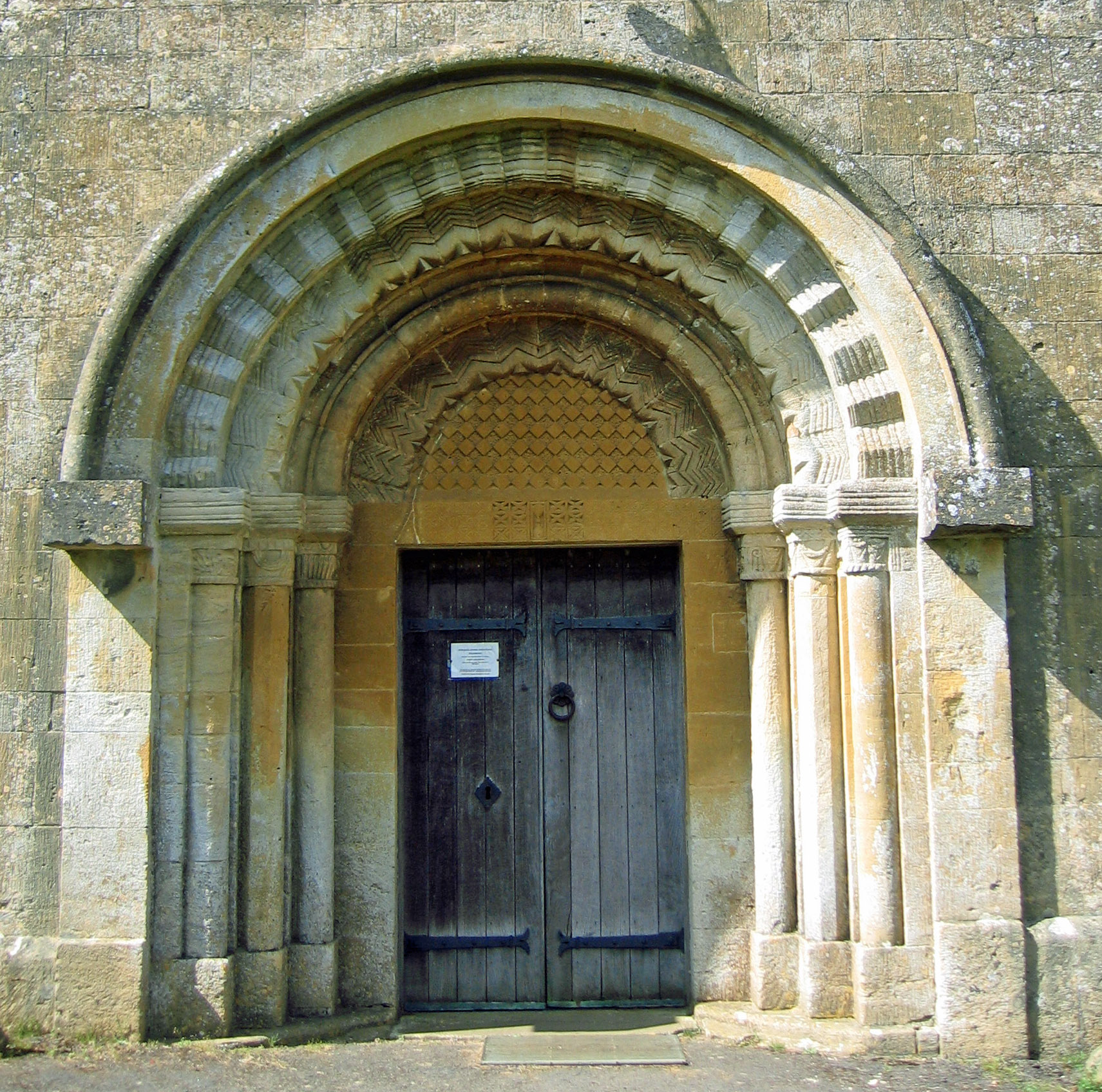
South doorway

In the churchyard are objects listed Grade II. One of these is the limestone base of a cross shaft dating from the medieval period. The other is a pair of unidentified monuments dated respectively 1777 and 1787. The churchyard also contains the war graves of two soldiers of World War I, and an airman and Royal Army Medical Corps officer of World War II.
