= Hawling Manor, Gloucestershire =

Hawling Manor
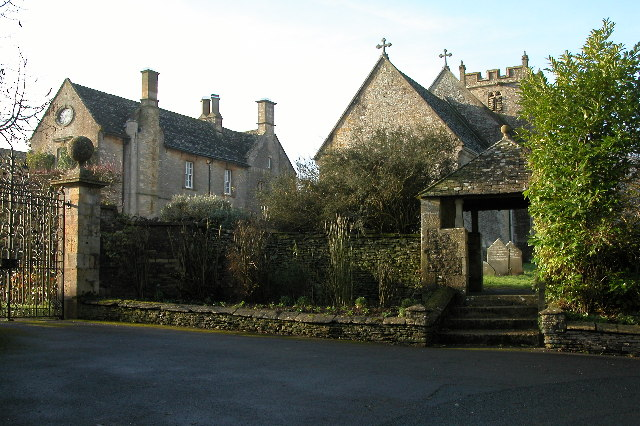
- Hawling church and manor house

- Location in Gloucestershire
- 51°54′16.92″N 01°54′36.36″W
- Location: Hawling, Gloucestershire, England

Hawling Manor in Hawling, Gloucestershire is a Grade II listed building.

== History ==
Information from Country Life states that the manor "was held in 1066 by the Countess Goda, sister of Edward the Confessor...." The present building dates from the 16th century, with some additions and alterations from the 17th through to the 20th century, with St Edward's Church next door, according to Country Life.

== Owner ==
James Holder, co-founder of SuperGroup plc until June 2016, was previously the owner of Hawling Manor.
