= Guiting Power =

Village in Gloucestershire, England

Coordinates: 51°55′N 1°52′W

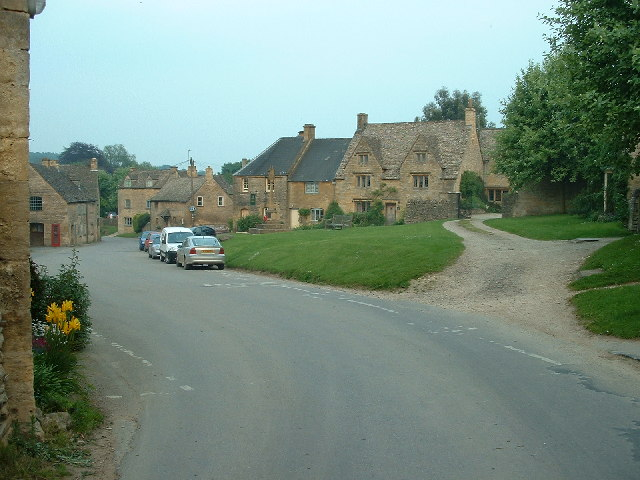
- Guiting Power, looking south-east down the village

- Location within Gloucestershire
- Population: 296 (2011 Census)
- OS grid reference: SP094248
- Civil parish: Guiting Power
- District: Cotswold
- Shire county: Gloucestershire
- Region: South West
- Country: England
- Sovereign state: United Kingdom
- Post town: Cheltenham
- Postcode district: GL54
- Police: Gloucestershire
- Fire: Gloucestershire
- Ambulance: South Western
- UK Parliament: North Cotswolds

Guiting Power is a village and civil parish in the Cotswolds, in Gloucestershire, England. The population of the parish at the 2011 census was 296.

Guiting Power stands on the slopes of a small valley formed by a tributary of the River Windrush, mid-way between Cheltenham and Stow-on-the-Wold, and lies to the north of the parish church, which is located at Ordnance Survey grid reference SP 096246.

== History ==
Excavations have revealed Iron Age activity and a Roman figurine. There was a late Anglo-Saxon settlement on the site of the present village, when it was called Gyting Broc, and archaeological research has shown that there has been a settlement on this land since about 780 or even earlier. Finds include a small Saxon sarcophagus and the remains of an early Saxo-Norman chapel.

The village was at the heart of a manor owned by King Edward the Confessor, but it had declined by the time of the Domesday Book of 1086. The name Guiting is believed to derive from the Anglo-Saxon word getinge, meaning rushing, which may refer to the Windrush River, while the name Power comes from medieval lords of the manor called Le Poher.

A brass monument in the church dated 1712 commemorates John Walker, Lord of the Manor. In 1872, the manor was owned by another J. Walker. The population of the village was then 647, and there were 161 dwellings. The church was in good condition, and there was also a Baptist chapel.

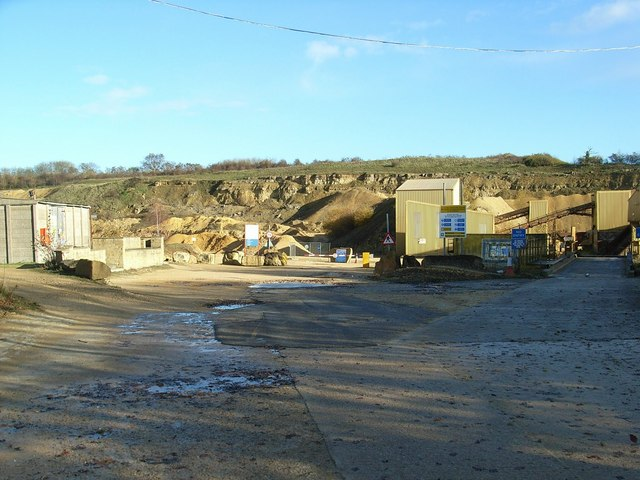
Guiting quarry

There are abandoned quarries at Guiting where the "yellow" and "white Guiting" limestone was mined; other areas of the Cotswolds more often used the oolite stone. Quarries in nearby villages still produce this type of stone.

In the 1930s, twelve cottages were bought by Moya Davidson for renovation, but by the 1950s the village was run down, thanks to a post-war depression in the farming industry, which then provided most local employment.

In August 1962, the British neo-Nazi organisation National Socialist Movement, led by Colin Jordan and John Tyndall organised a summer camp near the village to bring together fascists from across Europe and America. The leader of the American Nazi Party, George Lincoln Rockwell, amongst others were illegally smuggled into the country to attend the event. The camp resulted in significant media attention, and on one of the days around 100 villagers and anti-fascist protesters attacked the camp led by a local publican, Walter Morley, wielding a shotgun. The camp resulted in the Cotswold Agreements and the establishment of the World Union of National Socialists.

In 1968, the manor of Guiting Power, including about half of the houses in the village, was bought by Raymond Cochrane, who intended to renovate and develop the village. In the 1970s, he formed the Guiting Manor Amenity Trust, a charitable body, to own his estate after his death. The Trust continues to own and manage the Cochrane property, including 67 houses, some of which it rents as affordable housing. Many of the properties have been renovated by the Trust.

The Trust also owns 580 acres of farm land, which is rented to its subsidiary, Guiting Manor Farms Ltd, a company which specializes in sustainable food production. Various crops are grown and sheep are raised; the lambs are sold for meat.

=== 1968 air crash ===
On 26 February 1968, two BAC Jet Provost aircraft had a mid-air collision over the village. The instructor and pilot of one aircraft ejected, and parachuted near Hawling. The firemen came from Stow on the Wold and Winchcombe.

The instructor Flt Lt Derek Smith, was from Weybridge. 29 year old Fl Off Jonathan Tye, of Lea in rural Derbyshire, was at RAF Scampton.

== Facilities and features ==
The village is unusual for its size in having a Post Office, a village hall, a children's nursery, a bakery, a village shop, and two public houses, the Farmer's Arms and the Hollow Bottom. Nearby are the excavated foundations of the original Anglo-Saxon church and a large kerbed round barrow shown as a tumulus on Ordnance Survey maps. To a large extent, the village owes its preservation to the Guiting Manor Amenity Trust.

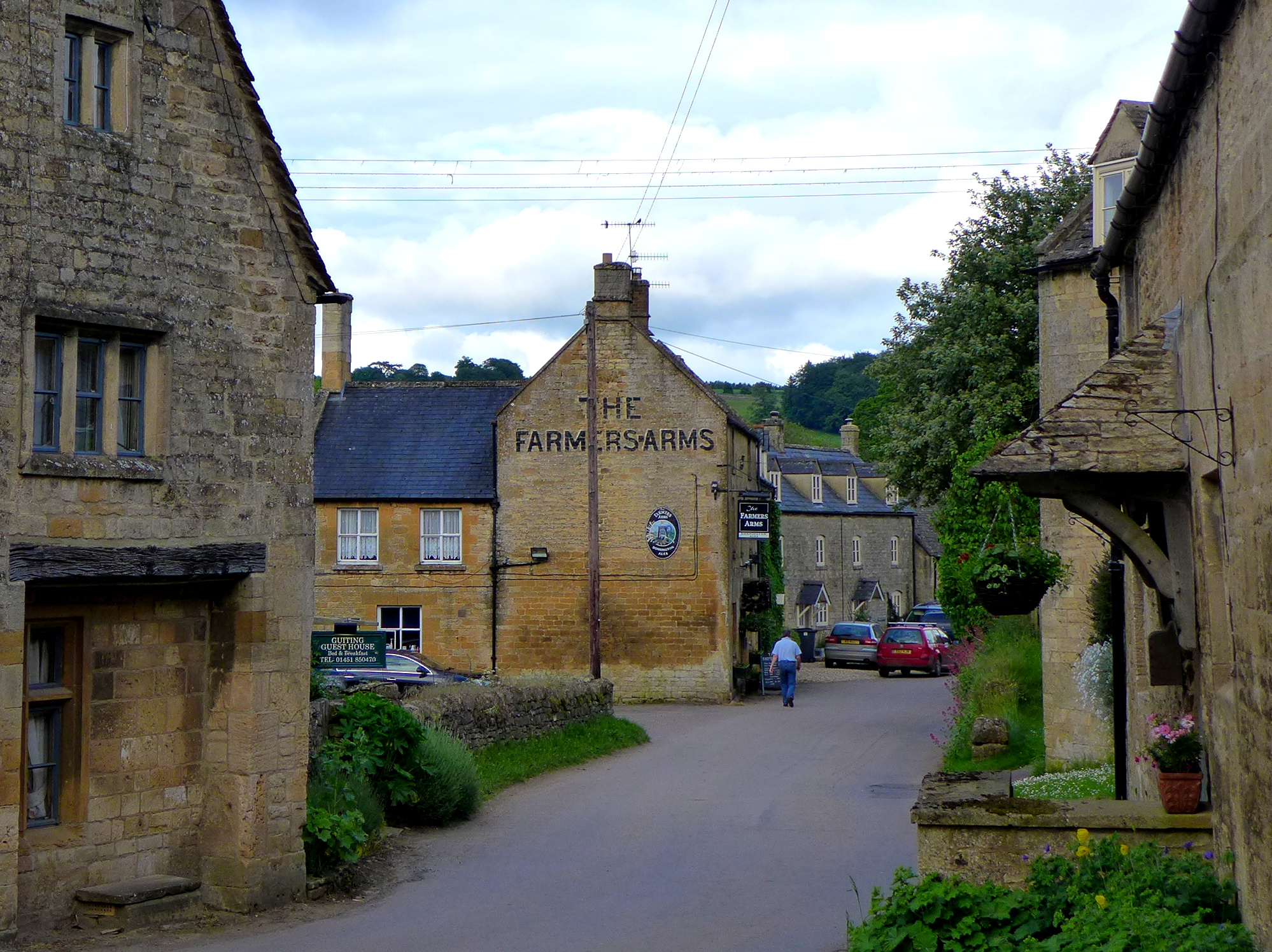
The Farmer's Arms pub

The Wardens' Way passes through the village, on its 14-mile (23 km) route from Bourton-on-the-Water to Winchcombe, passing close by the church. It joins the Oxfordshire Way to the Cotswold Way and can be combined with the Windrush Way to make a circular route. It passes through the Cotswold villages of Guiting Power, Naunton, Lower Slaughter and Upper Slaughter.

A village School was built in 1872. When the building was closed, it was bought by the Trust and converted into a village playschool nursery for the residents' children.

There is a 17-acre (6.9 ha) wetland nature reserve, where a rich flora and fauna thrive.

The nearby Cotswolds Farm Park, privately owned by Adam Henson, is a tourist attraction with some fifty different breeds of farm animals. The farm park also operates a campsite with "pitches" for campers, fourteen of them with electricity.

== Religion ==
The parish church of St Michael and All Angels stands at the south end of the village. It is of Norman origin, with a later Victorian transept added. The north and south doorways were preserved in the renovations at that time. Extensive remodelling took place in the 13th and 15th centuries, and the church was enlarged in the first half of the 1800s. The 12th-century chancel was extensively modified in 1903. The church is in the National Heritage List for England as a designated Grade II listed building (List entry Number: 1089532, June 1980).

St Michael's is part of a team ministry called the Benefice of the Seven Churches, which also includes Temple Guiting, Cutsdean, Farmcote, Lower Slaughter with Eyford, Upper Slaughter, and Naunton.

"Guiting Power" is a hymn tune by John Barnard, named after the village, for the hymn "Christ triumphant, ever reigning".

== Guiting Music Festival ==
The Guiting Music Festival (formerly the "Guiting Festival") was founded in 1970. It runs for ten days, starting in the last week of July every year. It typically comprises eight evening concerts, covering the genres of classical music, folk, and jazz. These are normally held in the Village Hall. Two open-air concerts are held in the adjacent playing fields on the first and second Sundays. The festival is a Registered Charity.

== Notable residents ==
SAS soldier and author Lofty Large grew up in Guiting Power.

Racing driver Charles Dawson was born in Guiting Power.

== Gallery ==
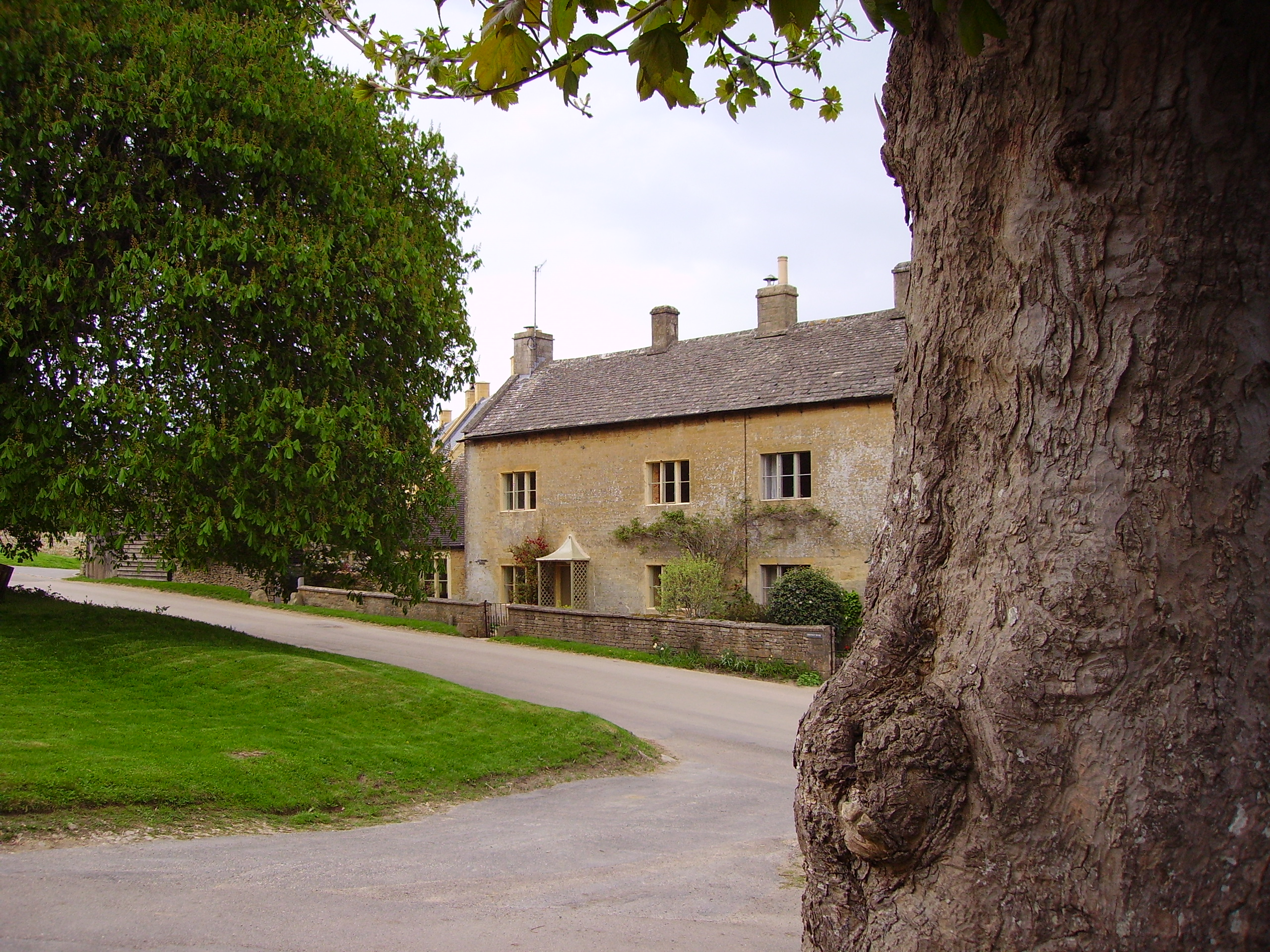
Village road

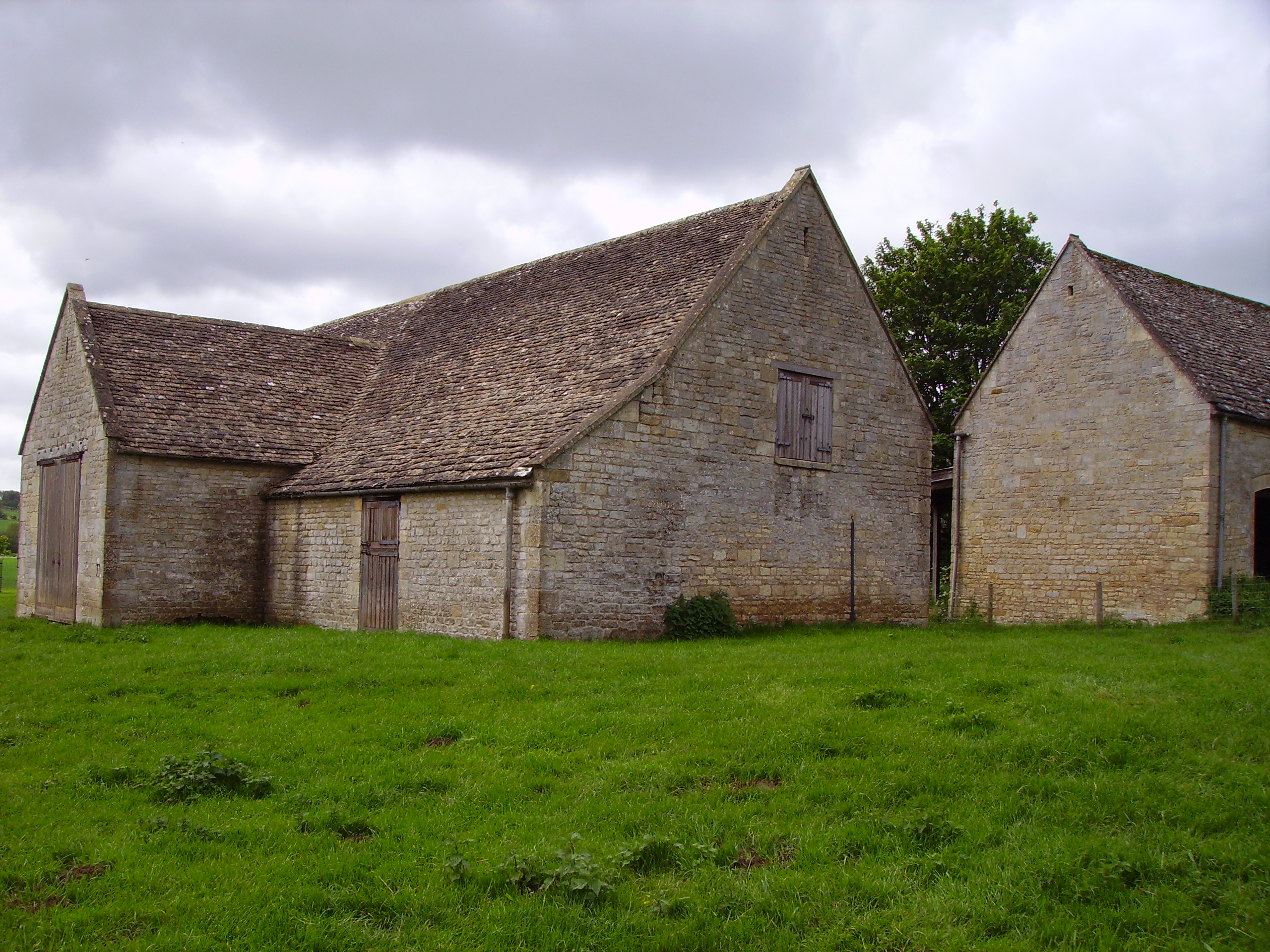
The barn

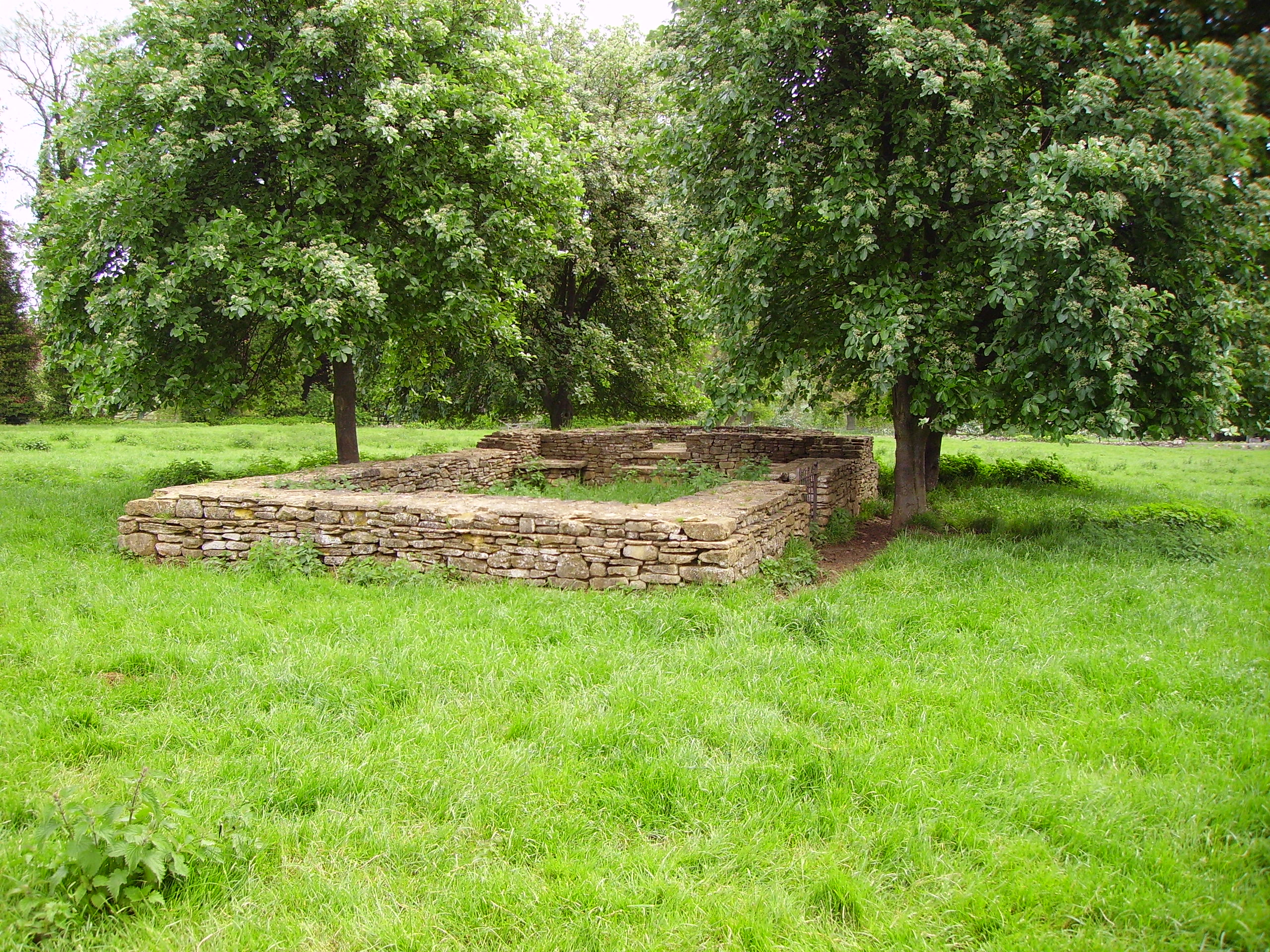
Consolidated remains of an Anglo-Saxon church

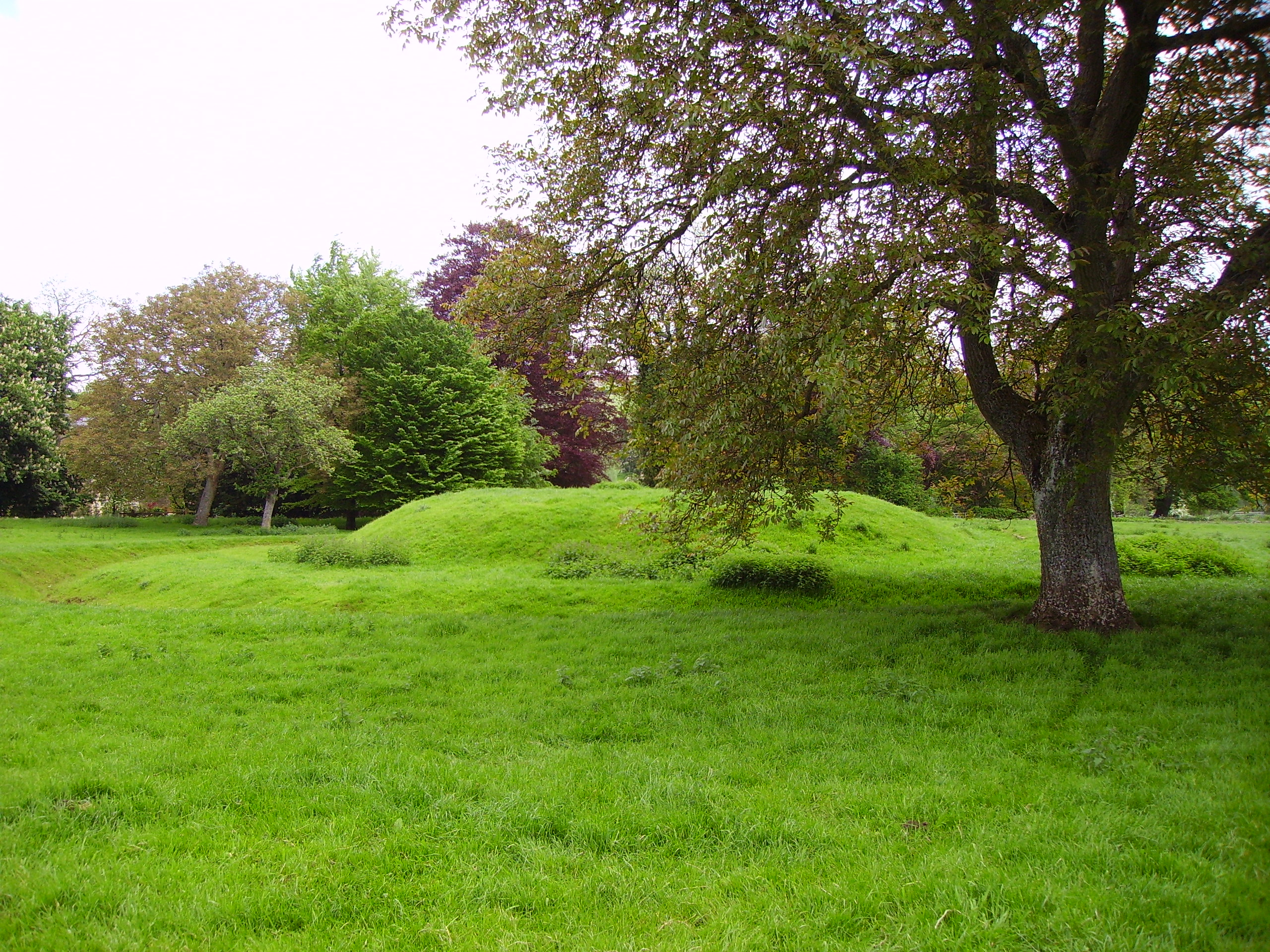
Late Neolithic Barrow

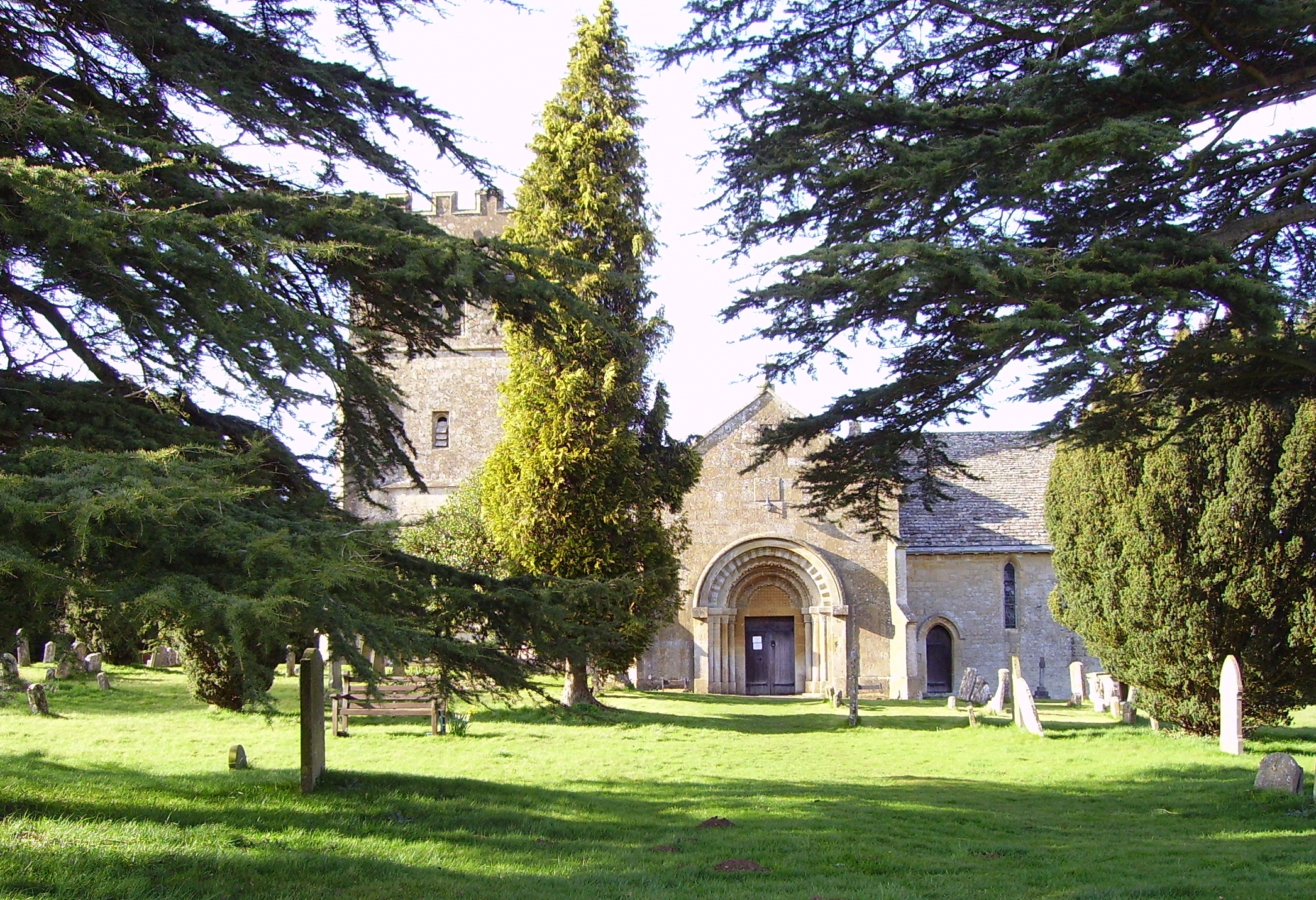
St Michael's & All Angels church, showing Norman doorway

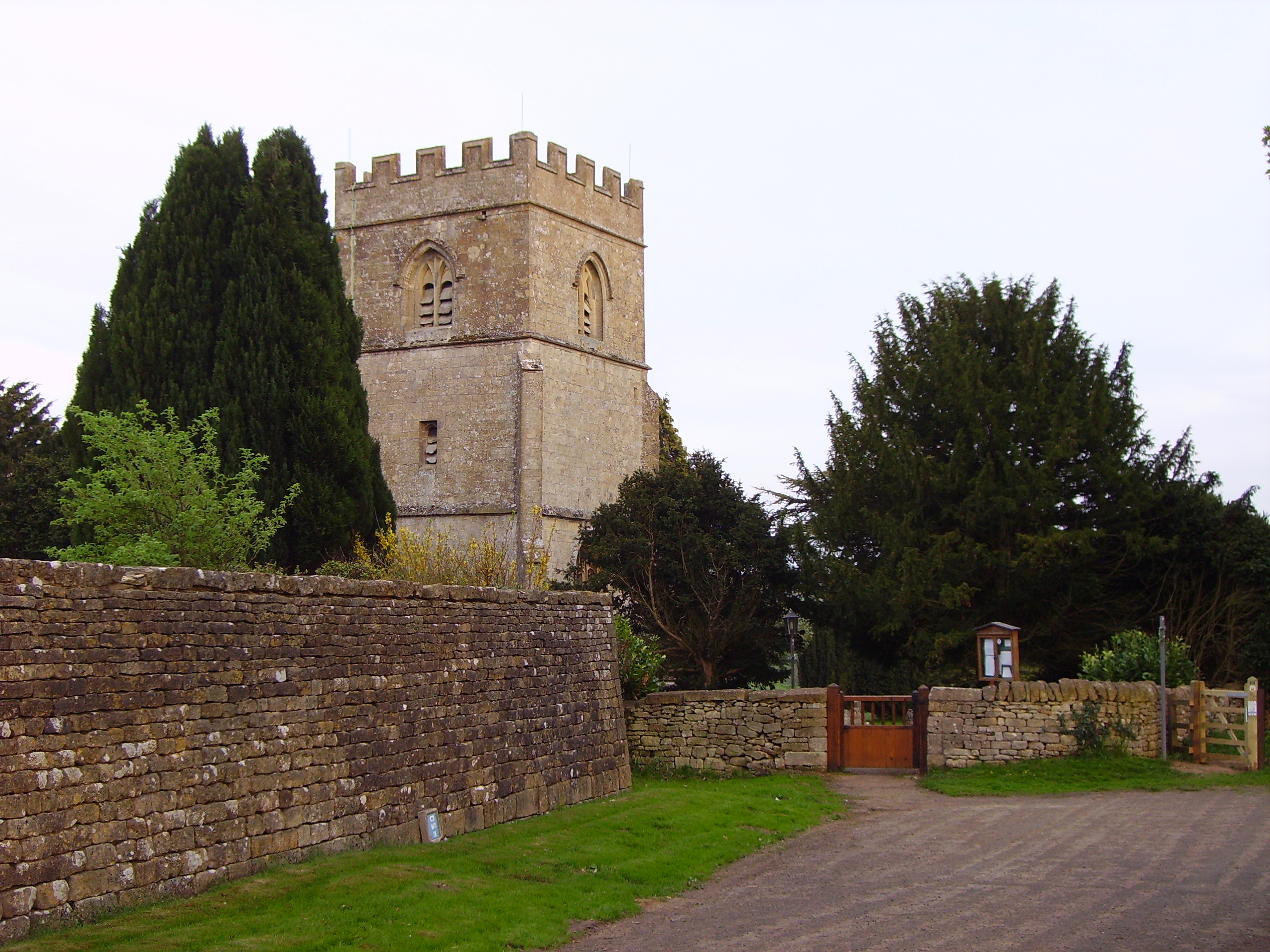
Church tower

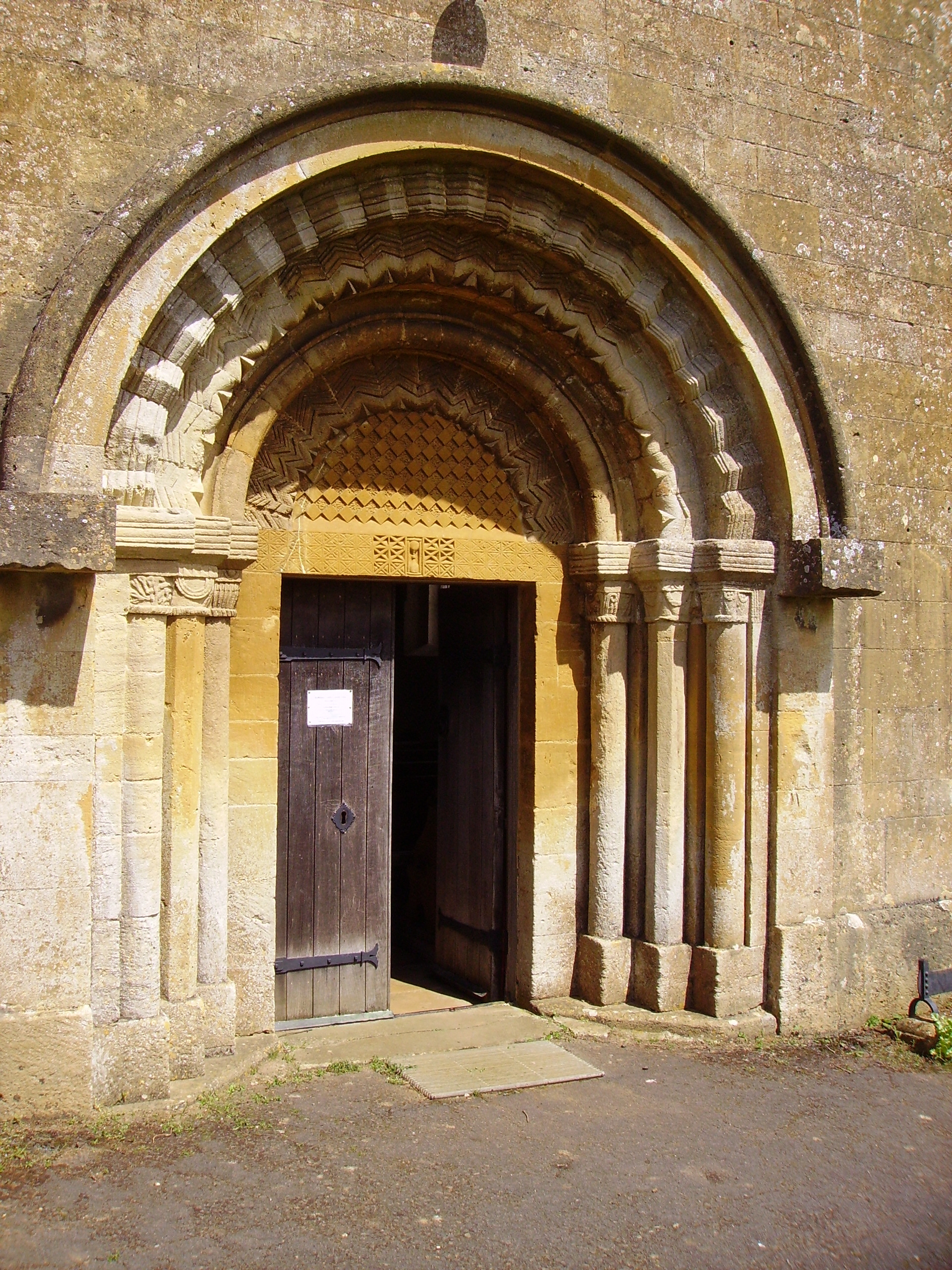
The South door
