= Trull House =

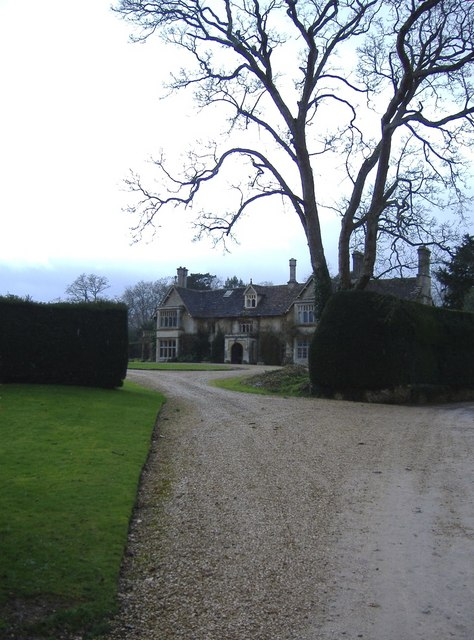
- Trull House

- Location in Gloucestershire
- 51°40′7″N 02°06′43″W
- Location: Ashley, Gloucestershire, England

Trull House is a Grade II listed country house near the hamlet of Trull, to the north of the village of Ashley and about 3.4 miles (5.5 km) northeast of Tetbury in Gloucestershire, England.

The seven-bedroom house, built in 1843, was once owned by Cooper Trull Ian Norman Mitchell, High Sheriff of Gloucestershire for 1969–70.
