= Chipping Campden Town Hall =

Municipal building in Gloucestershire, England

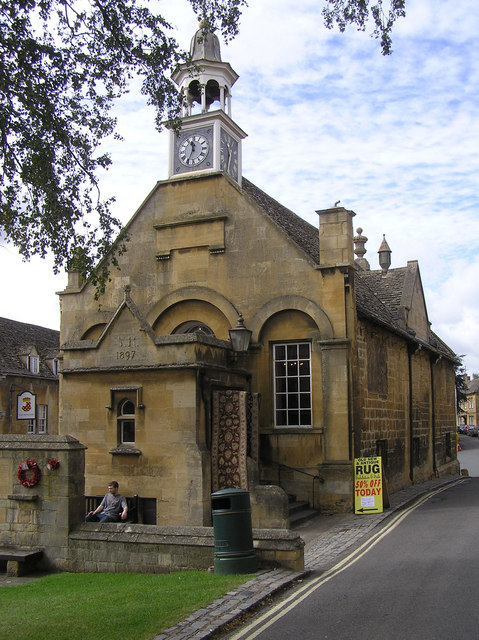
- Chipping Campden Town Hall

- Shown in Gloucestershire
- 52.0505°N 1.7814°W
- Location: High Street, Chipping Campden

History
- Built: 1897

Site notes
- Architectural style: Georgian style

Listed Building – Grade II*
- Official name: Town Hall, High Street
- Designated: 25 August 1960
- Reference no.: 1078401

Chipping Campden Town Hall is a municipal building in the High Street, Chipping Campden, Gloucestershire, England. The building, which is the meeting place of Chipping Campden Town Council, is a Grade II* listed building.

== History ==
The site in the middle row of the High Street was originally occupied by a Norman Chapel dedicated to St Catherine of Alexandria which was built on the initiative of the local lord of the manor, Hugh de Gondeville, in around 1180. The current structure was commissioned by the burgesses of the town and was built in rubble masonry in around 1520. There was originally an external staircase on the north side of the building leading up to a courtroom on the first floor. There was also a lock-up for criminals in the basement and it is likely that Joan Perry, and her two sons, John and Richard Perry, who were hanged for the supposed murder of the rent collector, William Harrison, were held in this cell in 1660: Harrison re-appeared several year later in mysterious circumstances and his re-appearance became known as the Campden Wonder.

The external staircase on the north elevation was removed and the south, east and west elevations were remodelled to a design by a local architect and builder, Richard Hulls, in the Georgian style in the early 19th century. His design involved an asymmetrical main frontage with three bays facing south onto the High Street. On the ground floor, there was a double doorway flanked by buttresses in the central bay and smaller doors in the outer bays, the left-hand of which led to a caretaker's flat. On the first floor, there were two-part windows with architraves in the central and right-hand bays. The west elevation was fenestrated by four-part windows on the first two floors and a Diocletian window in the attic, while the east elevation featured three round headed openings on the ground floor and a blind panel in the gable above. At roof level, there was a small belfry with an ogee-shaped roof. Internally, the principal room was the main hall on the first floor.

In the mid-18th century the double doorway to the building became the access for a horse-drawn fire engine. A new clock was added at the base of the belfry in 1882, replacing one dating from the 18th-century; but the borough council, which had met in the town hall, was abolished under the Municipal Corporations Act 1883. The building was substantially remodelled, with a new porch installed at the east end of the building as part of the celebrations for Diamond Jubilee of Queen Victoria, in 1897. It was officially re-opened by the Earl of Gainsborough in 1898.

In the 20th century the town hall was primarily used as an events venue with highlights including a performance by the Magpie Players, a troupe of actors from the University of Oxford in August 1939. Following local government re-organisation in 1974, the town hall became the meeting place of Chipping Campden Town Council. An extensive programme of refurbishment works, which included new roofing, was completed in April 2013. Works of art in the town hall include a portrait of the former member of parliament, Sir Gerard Noel.

== See also ==
- Grade II* listed buildings in Cotswold (district)
