= Harnhill =

Village in Gloucestershire, England

Coordinates: 51.7017°N 1.9039°W

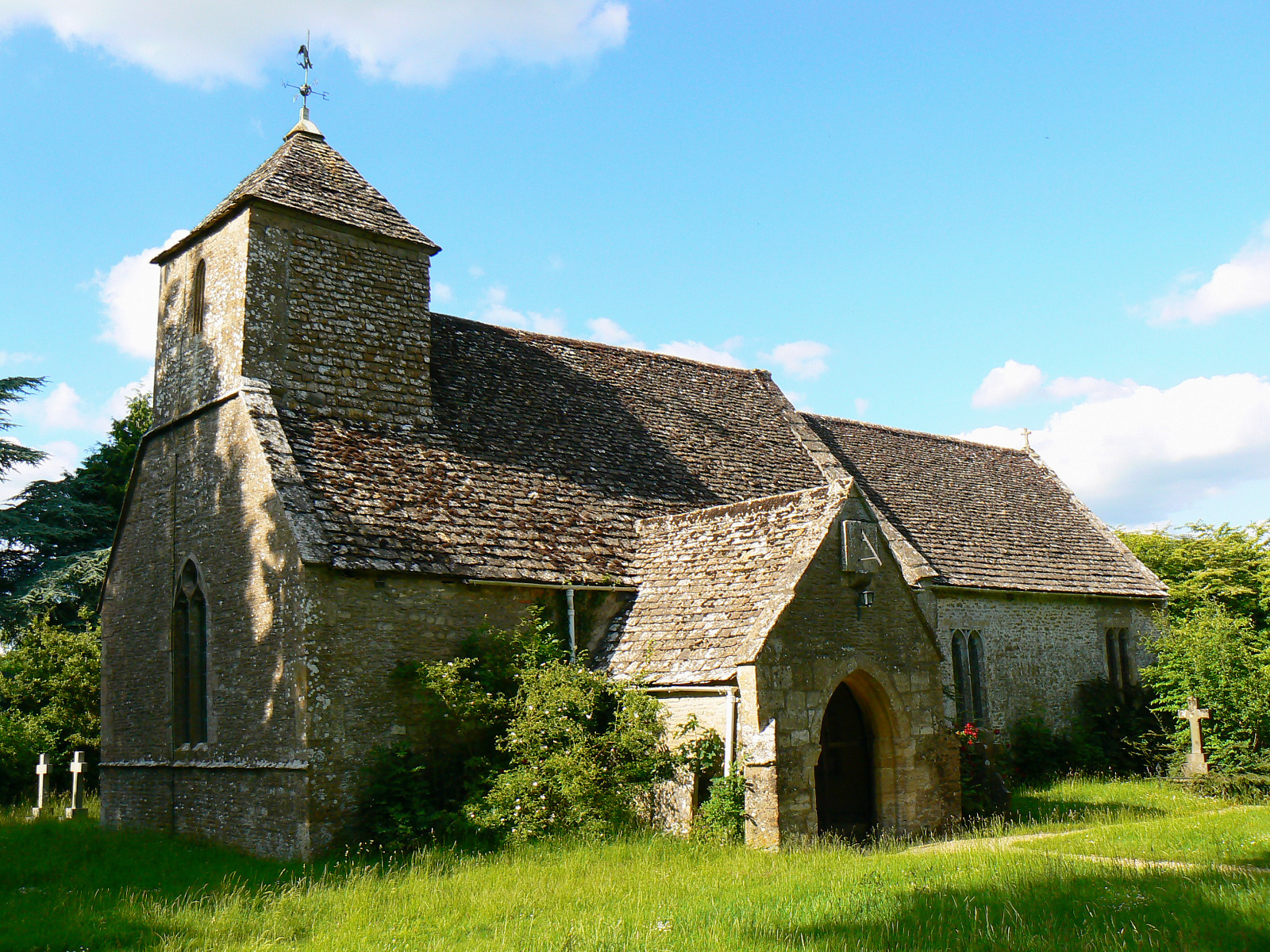
- Harnhill church

- Location within Gloucestershire
- OS grid reference: SP0700
- Civil parish: Driffield
- District: Cotswold
- Shire county: Gloucestershire
- Region: South West
- Country: England
- Sovereign state: United Kingdom

Harnhill is a village and former civil parish now in the parish of Driffield, in the Cotswold district, in the county of Gloucestershire, England. It is about 3 miles (5 km) miles from the town of Cirencester. In 1931 the parish had a population of 74. Harnhill has a church called St Michael's Church which is grade II* listed, the Harnhill Centre of Christian Healing is north of the village.

== History ==
The name origin of "Harnhill" is uncertain and may mean 'Grey hill' or perhaps, 'hares' hill'. Harnhill was recorded in the Domesday Book as Harehille. On 1 April 1935 the parish was abolished and merged with Driffield.
