= St Andrew's Church, Naunton =

Church in Naunton, Gloucestershire, England

Coordinates: 51.9092°N 1.8383°W

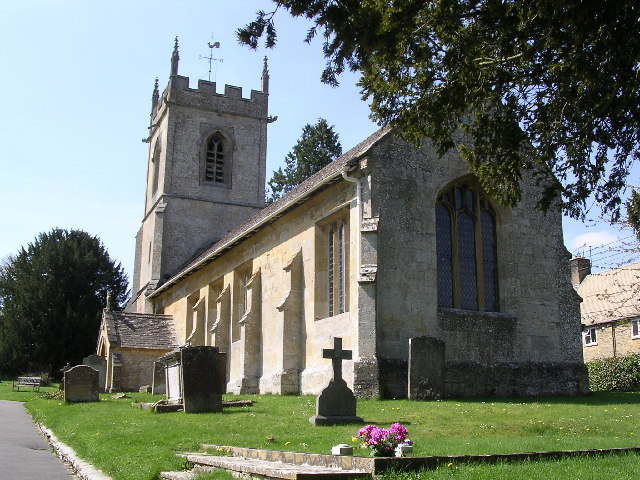
St Andrew's Parish Church

St Andrew's Church is an Anglican parish church in Naunton, Gloucestershire, dedicated to St Andrew the Apostle.

== History ==
Dating from the 13th century, the church replaced a Saxon church on the same site. It was rebuilt in the 15th, when a tower was added, and restored in 1878. It was named a Grade II* listed building in 1960.

It has two 18th-century sundials, one inscribed in Latin Lux Umbra Dei: "Light [is] the shadow of God."

The Renaissance playwright and poet Ulpian Fulwell was Rector of Naunton from about 1570 until his death in about 1586, but seems to have neglected his clerical duties. An episcopal visitation in 1572 concluded that the church building was decaying. Four years later Fulwell was fined when his clerk was found to be illiterate and that parents had ceased to send their children to catechism classes.

Another Rector, from 1660, was the prolific author and translator Clement Barksdale (1609–1687), who held the parish in plurality with Stow-on-the-Wold.

=== Present day ===
At present the parish of Naunton is part of the Archdeaconry of Cheltenham in the Diocese of Gloucester. The church has opted to continue using the 1662 Book of Common Prayer for its services.
