= St Saviour's Church, Tetbury =

Coordinates: 51.6380°N 2.1635°W

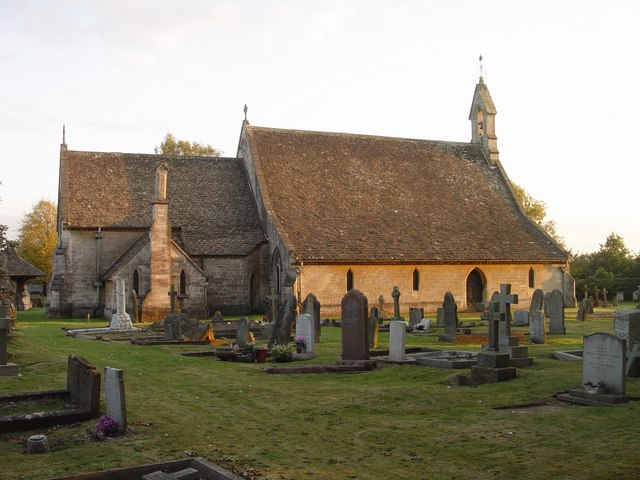
- St Saviour's Church, Tetbury, from the north

- Location in Gloucestershire
- OS grid reference: ST 887 932
- Location: Tetbury, Gloucestershire
- Country: England
- Denomination: Anglican

History
- Consecrated: 1848

Architecture
- Functional status: Redundant
- Heritage designation: Grade II*
- Designated: 21 March 1985
- Architect(s): Samuel Daukes; A. W. N. Pugin; John Hardman
- Architectural type: Church
- Style: Gothic Revival
- Completed: 1848

Specifications
- Materials: Stone, Cotswold stone roofs

St Saviour's Church is a historic 19th-century Anglican church in the town of Tetbury, Gloucestershire, England under the care of The Churches Conservation Trust. It was designed by the architect Samuel Daukes. Augustus Welby Northmore Pugin and John Hardman undertook the design and execution of the chancel roof. St Saviour's is recorded in the National Heritage List for England as a designated Grade II* listed building.

== History ==
The church was built in 1848 as a chapel of ease in the parish of St Mary the Virgin's Church, Tetbury. At that time the richer people paid a fee for the use of a pew in St Mary's (a pew rent). St Saviour's was built for the poorer people who could not afford this charge, and it came to be described as "a little church for the poor".

== Architecture ==
=== Exterior ===
St Saviour's is a Gothic Revival church in the Decorated Gothic style, built in local stone with Cotswold stone roofs. The plan has a nave with side aisles and a chancel from which projects a north vestry. The main entrance is through a south porch into the nave. The church has steeply gabled ends, which project beyond the roofline, terminating in small crosses and, at the western end, a bellcote. There is no clerestory, the roof of the nave extending into catslides of a less steep pitch over the aisles. The corners of the building have splayed stepped buttresses, with two more buttresses occurring on the west front, at the ends of the aisles.

The main windows of the church have tracery in the Flowing Decorated Gothic style of the early 14th century, that at the east of the chancel being the largest with three lights. There are two light windows in the south wall of the chancel, the ends of the aisles and a larger two light window into the nave. High in the nave gables are two small rose windows. The sides of the aisles are lit by small lancets.

=== Interior ===
Inside the church the nave is separated from the aisles by arcades of four bays supported on alternate round and octagonal piers. All the fittings date from the time of the building of the church. These include the pews with poppyhead ends, the stone font, the stone pulpit, and the wooden chancel screen. The original gas fittings are still in the church, although they are no longer functioning. These include the pipes, the wall brackets, and on the top of the chancel screen, a burner bar consisting of a row of gas jets. The church chandelier in the centre of the nave is a corona lucis gasolier by Hardman. The organ formerly in the church has been removed.

== External features ==
The lychgate is designated as a Grade II listed building. It is thought to be contemporary with the church, and is built in stone with a Cotswold slate roof. The churchyard contains the war graves of six Commonwealth service personnel of World War I, and ten of World War II.

== See also ==
- List of churches preserved by the Churches Conservation Trust in the English Midlands

== Bibliography ==
- Verey, David; Brooks, Alan (2000). Gloucestershire 1: The Cotswolds. The Buildings of England. Yale University Press. ISBN 0-14-071098-1.
