= Driffield, Gloucestershire =

Village in Gloucestershire, England

Coordinates: 51.696°N 1.895°W

Driffield
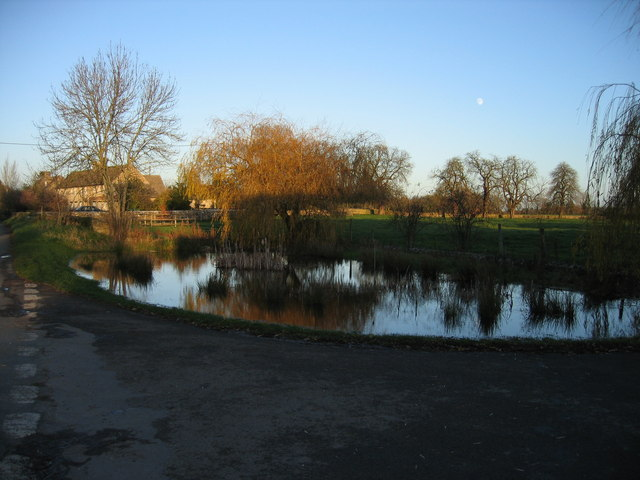
- Driffield village pond

- Location within Gloucestershire
- Area: 7.644 km^{2} (2.951 sq mi)
- Population: 173 (2021 census)
  - Density: 23/km^{2} (60/sq mi)
- Civil parish: Driffield
- District: Cotswold
- Shire county: Gloucestershire
- Region: South West
- Country: England
- Sovereign state: United Kingdom
- Post town: Cirencester
- Postcode district: GL7
- Police: Gloucestershire
- Fire: Gloucestershire
- Ambulance: South Western
- UK Parliament: South Cotswolds

Driffield is a village and civil parish in the Cotswold district of Gloucestershire, England. It is situated 3 1/2 miles (5.6 km) east-south-east of Cirencester. The parish includes the village of Harnhill. In 2021 the parish had a population of 173.

== History ==
The name "Driffield" means 'Dirty open land' or possibly, 'stubbly open land'. Driffield was recorded in the Domesday Book as Drifelle. On 1 April 1935 the parish of Harnhill was abolished and merged with Driffield.
