= Church of St James, Ashley =

Church in Gloucestershire, England

Coordinates: 51.6512°N 2.1001°W

Church of St James
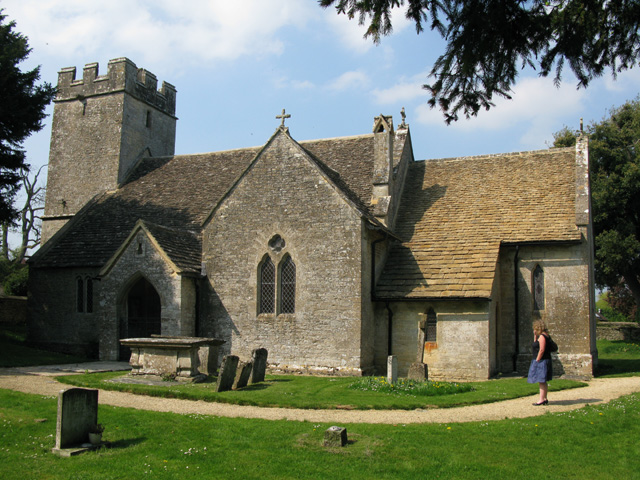

- Denomination: Church of England

Architecture
- Heritage designation: Grade II* listed building
- Designated: 6 September 1954

Administration
- Province: Canterbury
- Diocese: Bristol
- Parish: Ashley

The Anglican Church of St James at Ashley in the Cotswold District of Gloucestershire, England, was built in the Norman period and rebuilt around 1200. It is a grade II* listed building.

== History ==
The Norman church was rebuilt around 1200. In 1848 it was restored and the chancel rebuilt.

The parish is part of the Braydon Brook benefice within the Diocese of Bristol.

== Architecture ==
The stone building has slate roofs. It consists on a nave, chancel and south aisle with a two-stage 15th century west tower with gargoyles. The south porch Norman doorway has a lintel and tympanum.
