= Clement Barksdale =

17th-century English writer

- Born: November 1609; Winchcombe, Gloucestershire
- Died: January 1687 (aged 77)

Clement Barksdale (November 1609 – January 1687) was a prolific English religious author, polymath and Anglican priest. He lost his London parish in the English Civil War, but gained Gloucestershire livings at the Restoration and taught at a private school.

== Life ==
Clement Barksdale was born at Winchcombe, Gloucestershire in November 1609.

After studying at John Roysse's Free School in Abingdon, (now Abingdon School), he entered Merton College, Oxford as "a servitor" in Lent term 1625, but moved shortly to Gloucester Hall (afterwards Worcester College, Oxford), where he took his degrees in arts.

He entered holy orders, and in 1637 acted as chaplain of Lincoln College. In the same year he moved to Hereford, where he became master of Hereford Cathedral School, vicar-choral, and soon after, Vicar of All Hallows there. When Hereford garrison was taken by the parliamentary army in 1646, he retreated to Sudeley Castle to shelter with the Chandos family, to which he acted as chaplain in the opening years of the civil war.

In 1650 he moved to Hawling, Gloucestershire, in the Cotswold district, where he taught at a private school with success and had several pupils of rank. There he composed his Nympha Libethris, or the Cotswold Muse, presenting some extempore Verses to the Imitation of yong Scholars (1651). At the Restoration he was presented to the livings of Naunton near Hawling, and of Stow-on-the-Wold in Gloucestershire, which he retained until his death in January 1687 in his 79th year.

In 1671 Barksdale became Librarian of Gloucester Cathedral.

Anthony à Wood said that he left behind him "the character of a frequent and edifying preacher and a good neighbour".

== Works ==
His major works are:

- Monumenta Literaria: sive Obitus et Elogia doctorum Virorum, ex Historiis Jac. Aug. Thuani, 1640
- A Short Practical Catechism out of Dr. Hammond, with a Paper Monument, 1649
- Adagilia Sacra Novi Testamenti … ab Andr. Schotto, 1651
- Nympha Libethris, or the Cotswold Muse, 4 parts, 1651
- Life of Hugo Grotius, 1652
- Noctes Hibernæ: Winter Nights' Exercise, 1653
- V. cl. Elogia Anglorum Camdeniana,1653
- The Disputation at Whinchcombe, 9 Nov. 1653, 1653
- An Oxford Conference of Two Young Scholars touching their Studies, 1659
- A Modest Reply in Three Letters touching the Clergy and Universities, 1659
- Sermons, separately published: The Sacrifice,1655; King's Return, 1660; on 2 Samuel xv. 25, 1660; on Psalm cxxii. 6, 1680
- The Kings return. A sermon preached at Winchcomb in Gloucestershire upon the Kings-day, Thursday, May 24. 1660
- Of Contentment, 1660, 4th edit. 1679
- Defence of the Liturgy, 1661
- Memorials of Worthy Persons, 1661
- Remembrances of Excellent Men, 1670
- Masora: a Collection out of the learned Master J. Buxtorfius's Comment. Masoreticus, 1665
- Collection of Scripture illustrated by Mr. Richard Hooker, 1675
- Three Ministers, … their Collections and Notices touching several Texts at their Weekly Meeting, 1675
- Letter touching a College of Maids or a Virgin Society, 1675
- Hugonis Grotii Annot. Selectæ ad vii. cap. S. Matthæi, 1675
- Behold the Husbandman, 1677
- Learn to die,1679
- Bezæ Epitaphia Selecta, 1680
- Sententiæ Sacræ, 1680
- Aurea Dicta: the King's gracious Words, 1681
- Memorials of Alderman Whitmore, Bp. Wilkins, Reynolds, etc. 1681
- Religion in Verse, 1683
- Old Gentleman's Wish, 1684
- Of Authors and Books, 1684
- Century of Sacred Distichs, or Religion in Verse,(this was Religion in Verse enlarged)
- Grateful Mention of Deceased Bishops, 1686

He translated a number of Hugo Grotius’s works. He also made translations of books and tractates by Cyprian, Anna Maria van Schurman, and others.

== See also ==
- List of Old Abingdonians
