= All Saints Church, Shorncote =

Coordinates: 51.6693°N 1.9649°W

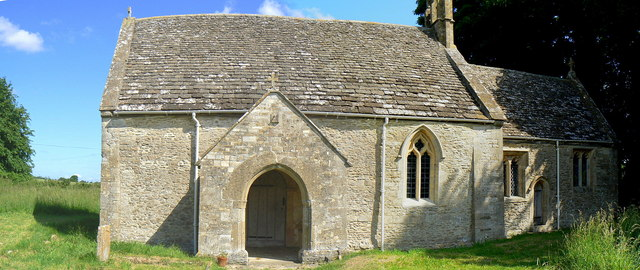
- All Saints Church, Shorncote, from the south

- Location in Gloucestershire
- Location: Shorncote, Gloucestershire
- Country: England
- Denomination: Anglican
- Website: Churches Conservation Trust

History
- Dedication: All Saints

Architecture
- Functional status: Redundant
- Heritage designation: Grade II*
- Designated: 26 November 1958
- Architect: William Butterfield (restoration)
- Architectural type: Church
- Style: Norman, Gothic
- Groundbreaking: About 1170
- Completed: 14th century

Specifications
- Materials: Stone, stone slate roofs

All Saints Church is a historic Anglican church in Shorncote, Gloucestershire, England under the care of The Churches Conservation Trust. It is recorded in the National Heritage List for England as a designated Grade II* listed building.

== History ==
All Saints dates from about 1170. Alterations were made to it, including the addition of a bellcote, in the 14th century. The church was restored by William Butterfield in 1883. The church was declared redundant on 1 July 1984, and was vested in The Churches Conservation Trust on 18 March 1987.

== Architecture ==
The church is in Norman style. It is constructed in stone rubble, with stone slate roofs. The plan consists of a nave with a north aisle and a south porch, and a small chancel. On the east gable of the nave is a double bellcote, over which is a pierced quatrefoil. In the west, south and east walls are two-light windows. The south doorway is Norman, with Early English capitals on the outer columns. On the south side of the chancel is a priest's door between two straight-headed Perpendicular windows.

Inside the church are wagon roofs. The chancel arch is narrow and pointed and contains 15th-century gates. The arch is decorated with Norman style carving. The font is also Norman. In the chancel is a piscina and a credence shelf dating from the 14th century, and in the north wall is a 15th-century Easter Sepulchre. On the chancel walls are medieval wall paintings depicting patterns and foliage. The pulpit dates from the early 18th century and has a tester suspended above it. Also in the church are the Royal coat of arms carved in stone.

== See also ==
- List of churches preserved by the Churches Conservation Trust in the English Midlands
