= Ashley, Gloucestershire =

Coordinates: 51°39′N 2°6′W

Ashley
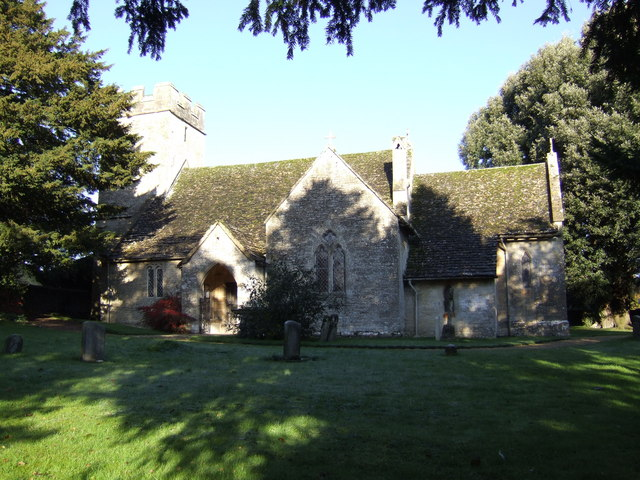
- Church of St James

- Location within Gloucestershire
- Population: 131 (2011 Census)
- District: Cotswold
- Shire county: Gloucestershire
- Region: South West
- Country: England
- Sovereign state: United Kingdom
- Post town: Tetbury
- Postcode district: GL8
- Police: Gloucestershire
- Fire: Gloucestershire
- Ambulance: South Western
- UK Parliament: South Cotswolds

Ashley is a village and civil parish in the Cotswold district of Gloucestershire, England, about 8 miles south-west of Cirencester. According to the 2001 census it had a population of 142, decreasing to 131 at the 2011 census. To the north, across the A433 road, is Trull House.

The Fosse Way forms part of the parish boundary and also the county boundary with Wiltshire. Ashley was one of several parishes which were transferred from Wiltshire to Gloucestershire in 1930.

The Church of St James was built in the Norman period and rebuilt around 1200. It is a grade II* listed building.

Ashley Manor was originally built in the 15th century and expanded in the 17th.
