= Edgeworth, Gloucestershire =

Village in Gloucestershire, England

Coordinates: 51.7542°N 2.0792°W

Edgeworth
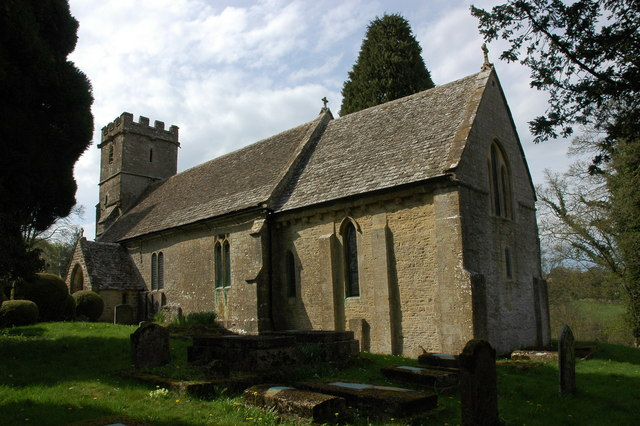

- Location within Gloucestershire
- Population: 165 (2011)
- Civil parish: Edgeworth
- District: Cotswold
- Shire county: Gloucestershire
- Region: South West
- Country: England
- Sovereign state: United Kingdom
- Post town: STROUD
- Postcode district: GL6
- Dialling code: 01285
- Police: Gloucestershire
- Fire: Gloucestershire
- Ambulance: South Western
- UK Parliament: North Cotswolds

Edgeworth is a small village and civil parish in the English county of Gloucestershire. It is located east of Stroud, west of Cirencester and south of Cheltenham.

The Church of St Mary was built in 11th century. It is a grade I listed building.

== Governance ==
Due to its small population, Edgeworth has a parish meeting rather than an elected parish council. It is part of the Ermin ward of the district of Cotswold, represented by Councillor Julia Judd, a member of the Conservative Party. Edgeworth is part of the constituency of North Cotswolds, represented in parliament by Conservative member of parliament (MP) Sir Geoffrey Clifton-Brown. Prior to Brexit in 2020, it was part of the South West England constituency of the European Parliament.
