= Naunton =

Village in Gloucestershire, England

Coordinates: 51°54′N 1°50′W

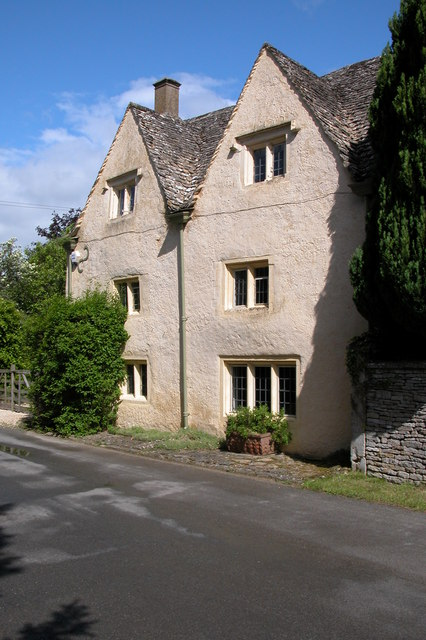

- Location within Gloucestershire
- Population: 352 (2011 Census)
- District: Cotswold
- Shire county: Gloucestershire
- Region: South West
- Country: England
- Sovereign state: United Kingdom
- Post town: Cheltenham
- Postcode district: GL54
- Police: Gloucestershire
- Fire: Gloucestershire
- Ambulance: South Western
- UK Parliament: North Cotswolds

Naunton is a village in Gloucestershire, England. It lies on the River Windrush in the Cotswolds, an area of outstanding natural beauty. Stow-on-the-Wold is about 6 miles to the east.

== Community ==
The population of Naunton in 2000 was 371, which fell to 352 at the 2011 census.

Once a farming community with the usual supporting trades, by the turn of the second millennium it had moved towards being a dormitory village. It has had no shops since 1999. Despite rising property prices, community activity remains and local associations include clubs for music, cricket, golf and tennis. The village has a parish council. The village hall was refurbished in 2017–2018 aided by a twenty-year government loan of £100,000.

There are single public bus services on Tuesdays to Andoversford and Fridays to Stow-on-the-Wold. The nearest railway station is at Moreton-in-Marsh (10 miles, 16 km away), providing several trains daily to London Paddington, Great Malvern, Hereford, Worcester and Oxford.

== Heritage ==
Naunton is referred to in the Domesday Book of 1086 as Niwetone. There has probably been a settlement there for at least 2000 years.

The present church, dedicated to St Andrew, dates largely from the 15th century. The Renaissance playwright and poet Ulpian Fulwell was Rector of Naunton from about 1570 until his death in about 1586. Another Rector, from 1660, was the prolific author and translator Clement Barksdale (1609–1687), who held the parish in plurality with Stow-on-the-Wold.

Naunton has a famous dovecote erected in 1660.

The 1998 Grand National winner, Earth Summit was prepared for the race in the village.
