= Churn Valley =

Valley in Gloucestershire, England

Coordinates: 51.80°N 1.98°W

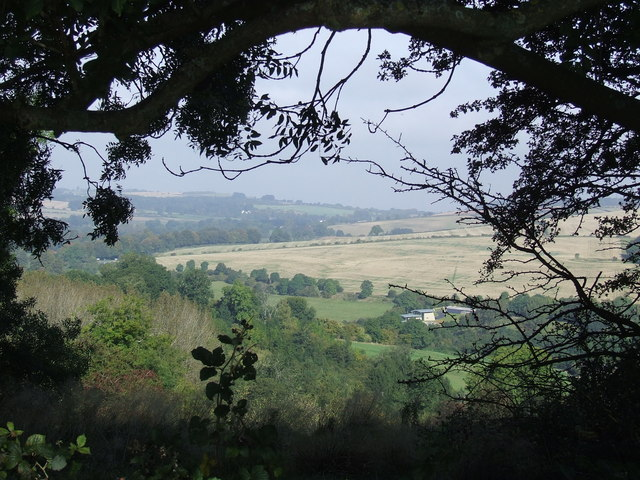
View across the upper valley toward Seven Springs

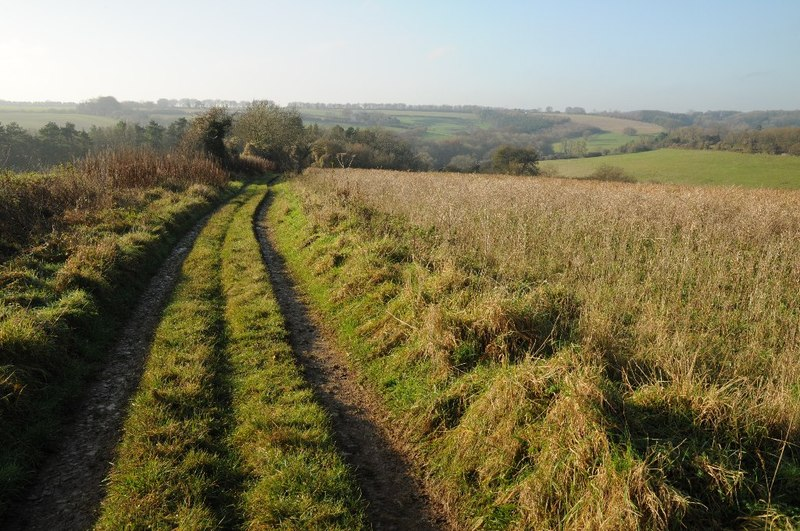
View from Burcombe Lane, Woodmancote of a neighboring valley looking west toward Duntisbourne Abbots and Winstone

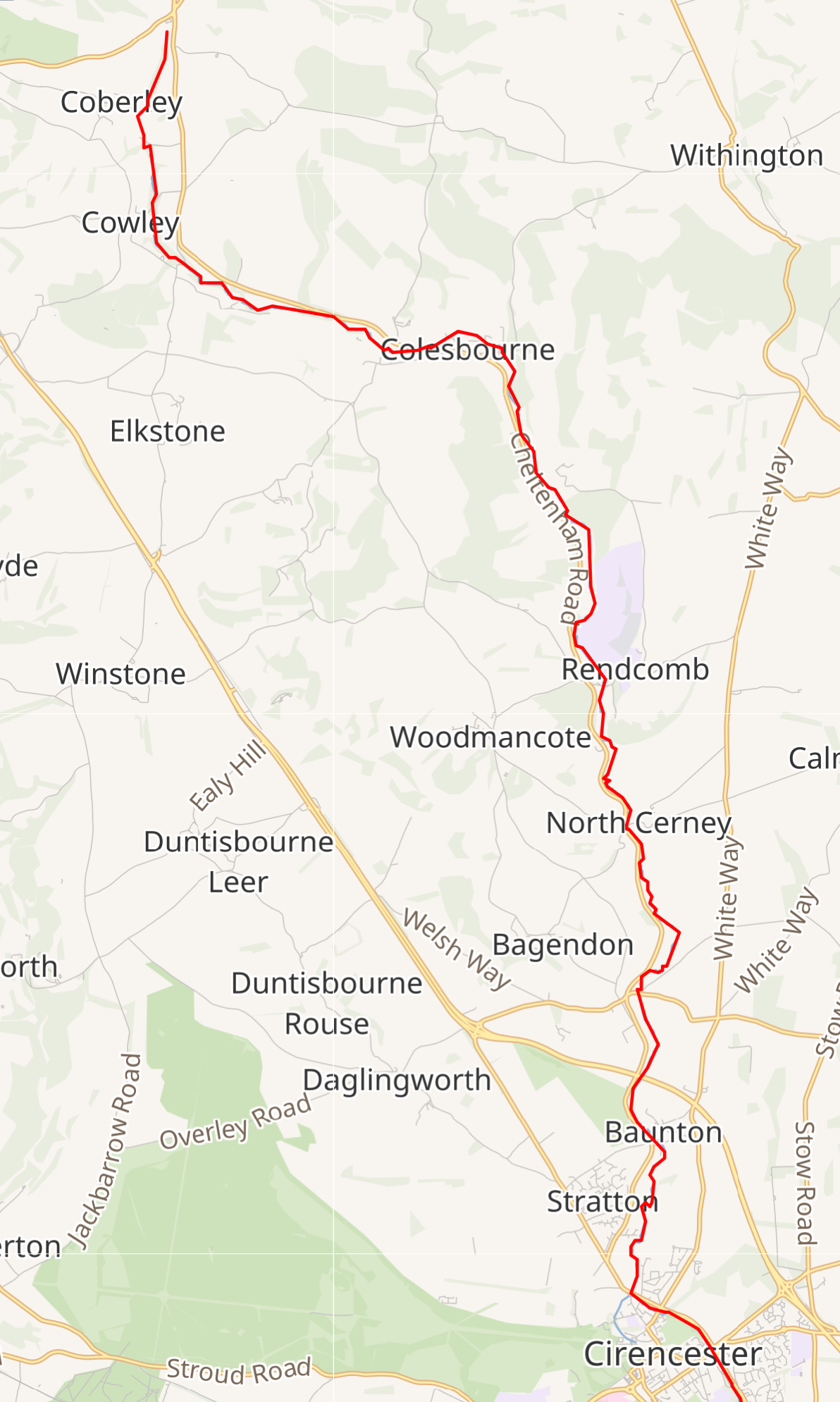

The Churn Valley is a valley in the Cotswold District of Gloucestershire, England that extends from Seven Springs to Cirencester. It runs along the River Churn and the A435.

Settlements along the upper valley include Coberley, Cowley, Colesbourne. Those further along include Rendcomb, North Cerney, and Bagendon.

== Geography ==
The valley forms a distinct slope profile that becomes shallower and broader downstream in the lower valley.
