= Major rivers of the United Kingdom =

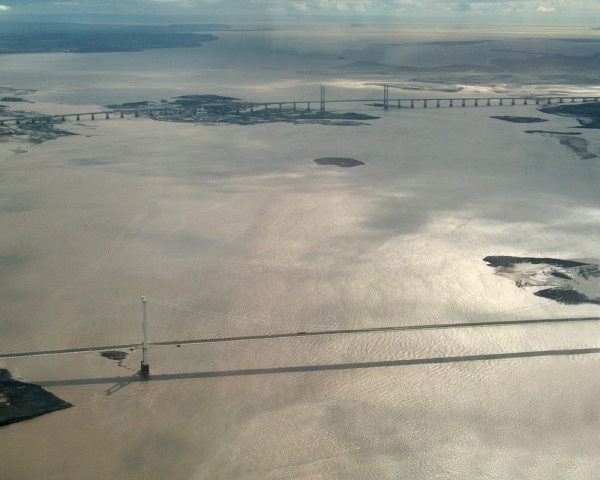
The Severn Bridges moving near the mouth of the River Severn

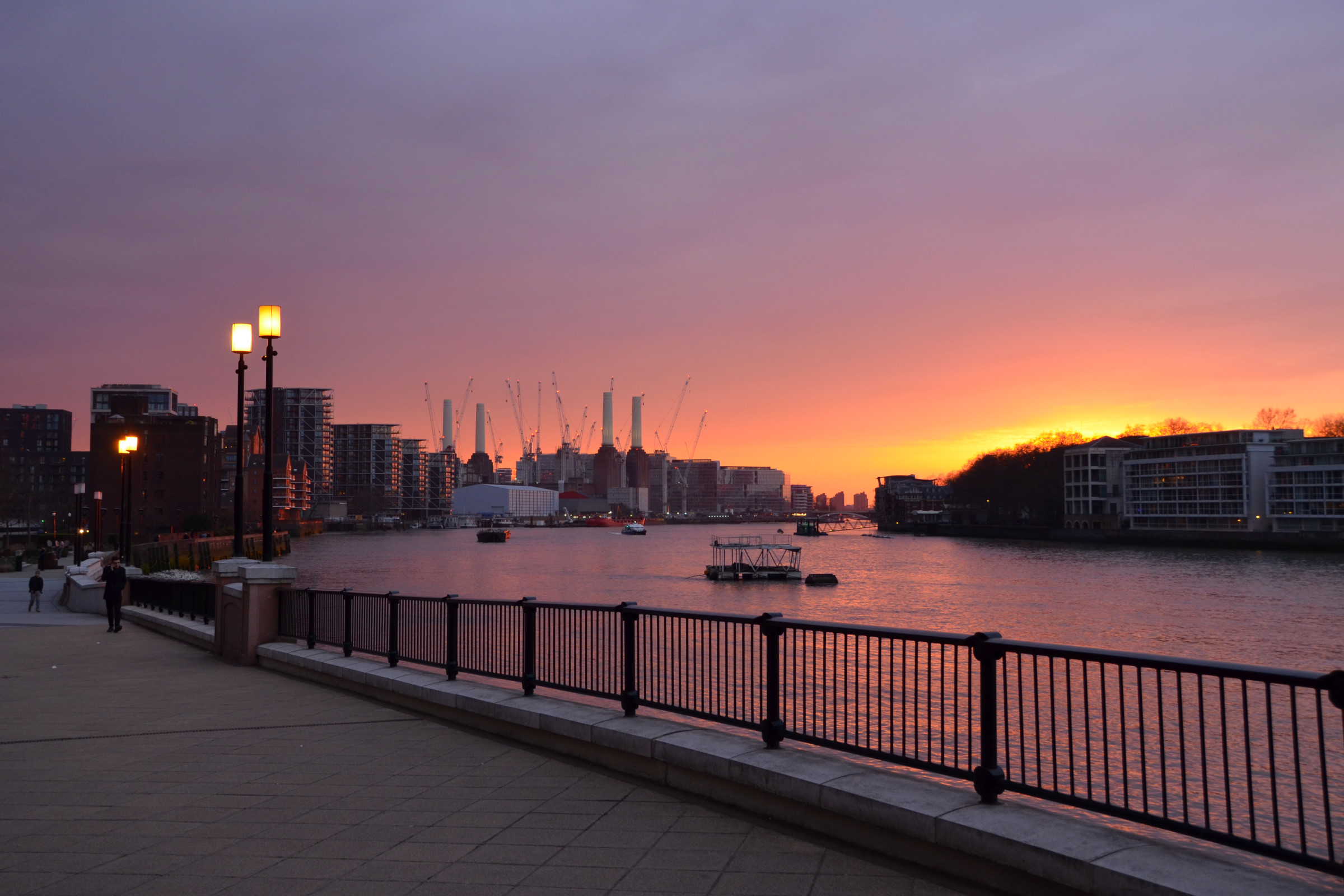
The River Thames in London

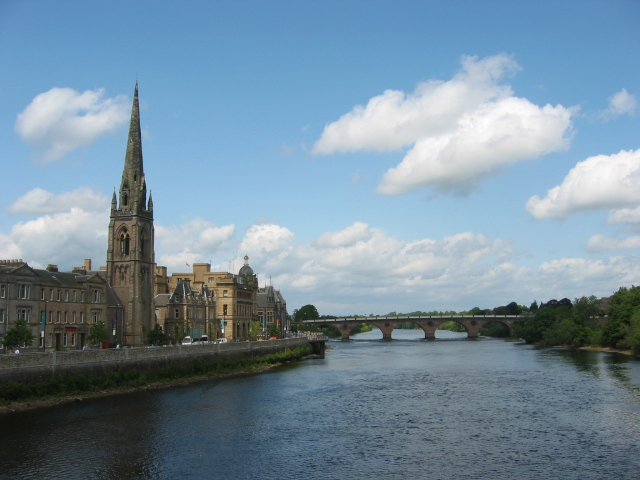
The River Tay in Perth, by measured flow the largest in Great Britain

This is a list of the major rivers of the United Kingdom, as being prominent in length, flow volume (discharge rate), or both.

== Major rivers of the United Kingdom ==
Rank	River	Length (miles)	Length (km)	Mean flow (m^{3}/s)	Mouth	Country
1	River Severn	220	354	107.4	Severn Estuary	Wales/England
2	River Thames	215	346	65.4	Thames Estuary	England
3	River Trent	185	297	89.0	The Humber	England
4	River Wye	155	250	73.1	Severn Estuary	Wales/England
5	River Great Ouse	143	230	15.6	The Wash	England
6	River Ure/River Ouse, Yorkshire	129	208	69.8	The Humber	England
7	River Tay	117	188	179.0	Firth of Tay	Scotland
8	River Clyde	109	176	48.5	Firth of Clyde	Scotland
9	River Spey	107	172	65.7	Moray Firth	Scotland
10	River Nene	100	161	9.3	The Wash	England
11	River Bann / Lough Neagh	99	159	92.2	Atlantic Ocean	Northern Ireland
12	River Tweed	96	155	81.7	North Sea	Scotland/England
13	River Avon, Warwickshire	96	154	17.3	River Severn*	England
14	River Eden, Cumbria	90	145	53.7	Solway Firth	England
15	River Dee, Aberdeenshire	87	140	47.8	North Sea	Scotland
16	River Witham	82	132	5.2	The Wash	England
17	River Teme	81	130	18.2	River Severn*	Wales/England
18=	River Don, Aberdeenshire	80	129	21.3	North Sea	Scotland
18=	River Foyle	80	129	58.8	Atlantic Ocean	Northern Ireland/Republic of Ireland
20	River Usk	78	125	28.6	Severn Estuary	Wales
21	River Teifi	76	122	29.5	Cardigan Bay	Wales
22=	River Towy	75	121	39.9	Carmarthen Bay	Wales
22=	River Ribble	75	120	34.0	Irish Sea	England
22=	River Avon, Bristol	75	120	22.2	Mouth of the Severn	England
25=	River Tyne	73	118	45.2	North Sea	England
25=	River Swale	73	118	20.2	River Ure	England
27	River Derwent, Yorkshire	72	115	17.4	River Ouse, Yorkshire	England
28=	River Aire	71	114	36.5	River Ouse, Yorkshire	England
28=	River Nith	71	114	36.5	Solway Firth	Scotland
30=	River Tees	70	113	22.2	North Sea	England
30=	River Medway	70	113	11.7	Thames Estuary	England
30=	River Mersey	70	113	37.1	Irish Sea	England
33=	River Dee, Wales	70	112	34.1	Dee Estuary	Wales/England
33=	River Don, South Yorkshire	70	112	16.3	River Ouse, Yorkshire	England
35	River Ness	68	110	90.7	Beauly Firth	Scotland
36=	River Welland	65	105	8.72	The Wash	England
36=	River Wharfe	65	105	17.6	River Ouse, Yorkshire	England
38=	River Tamar	61	98	22.9	English Channel	England
38=	River Stour, Dorset	61	98	13.8	Christchurch Harbour	England
40=	River Avon, Hampshire	60	96	20.0	Christchurch Harbour	England
40=	River Exe	60	96	25.4	English Channel	England
40=	River Wear	60	96	14.9	The North Sea	England

There seems to be little consensus in published sources as to the lengths of rivers, nor much agreement as to what constitutes a river. Thus the River Ure and River Ouse can be counted as one river system or as two rivers. If it is counted as one, the River Aire/ River Ouse/Humber system would come fourth in the list, with a combined length of 161 miles (259 km). The River Trent/Humber system would top the list with their combined length of 222 miles (357 km).

The Thames tributary, the River Churn, sourced at Seven Springs, adds 14 miles (23 km) to the length of the Thames, from its traditional source at Thames Head. The Churn/Thames' length at 229 miles (369 km) is therefore greater than the Severn's length of 220 miles (354 km). Thus, the combined Churn/Thames river would top the list. Sue Owen et al., in their book on rivers, generally restrict the length to the parts that bear the same name. Thus the River Nene is quoted at 100 miles (160 km), but would be around 5 miles (8 km) more if the variously named sources were included. Many of the above lengths are considerably different from Sue Owen's list, some longer and some shorter.

Where a river ends in an estuary the conventional British approach has been to treat the river as ending at the end of the administrative zone. Thus the Severn ends at the mouth of the Bristol Avon and the Thames at the Yantlet Line. The currently accepted end of the Severn Estuary is about 18.5 miles (29.8 km) further, and the Port of London's authority stretches now to Margate, 30 miles (48 km) further. Other countries have different conventions, making comparisons of limited value. Those rivers which empty into other (non-tidal sections of) rivers are indicated in the table thus*. In Yorkshire, the Aire, Derwent, Don, and Wharfe all empty into a tidal section of the Yorkshire Ouse.

The calculation of mean flow presents its own challenges, relying on sampling at a limited number of gauging stations. The data presented in the table are derived from those offered up by the National River Flow Archive, in particular the flow measured at the lowermost gauging stations on each named watercourse. Sometimes the figures of further downstream tributaries are combined with those of the main stem river to provide a more realistic flow figure for the lowermost non-tidal stretch of a watercourse, this also allows for less pollution.

== See also ==
- List of rivers of England
- List of rivers of Ireland
- List of rivers of Scotland
- List of rivers of Wales
- List of rivers in the Isle of Man
- Terminology
  - Estuary
  - Firth
  - Floodplain
  - River
  - River delta
  - Source (river or stream)
  - Tributary
  - Canal & River Trust
  - Canals of the United Kingdom
  - Geography of the United Kingdom
  - List of lakes in the United Kingdom
  - Reservoirs and dams in the United Kingdom
  - Waterfalls of the United Kingdom
  - Waterways in the United Kingdom
