= Ullenwood =

Village near Cheltenham, England

Coordinates: 51°51′10″N 2°5′10″W

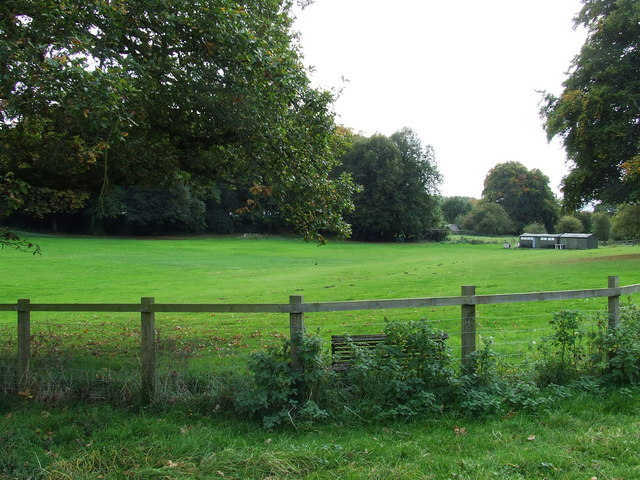
Ullenwood Cricket Field and Pavilion

Ullenwood is a village in the Coberley civil parish, near Cheltenham in Gloucestershire.

It is the site of a formerly secret civil defence bunker intended as a regional seat of government in the event of nuclear war.

It is the site of the former Ullenwood army camp which was used during the two World Wars as a U.S. military hospital.

For three decades at the end of the 20th century, Ullenwood Camp was used each summer as accommodation for archaeologists engaged in excavating the site at nearby Crickley Hill.

National Star College, an independent further education college and special school for people aged 16 to 25 with learning difficulties and physical disabilities, is based at Ullenwood Manor. The college grounds include a private 18-hole golf course used by Ullenwood Manor Golfing Society. Cotswold Hills Golf Club, founded in 1902, is also located at Ullenwood.

Prior to becoming the National Star College, the Manor was known as Ullenwood Manor Preparatory School for Boys. It was a boarding school for boys aged up to 13 years old. Pupils came from the UK and overseas, and included children and grandchildren of famous politicians (e.g. Kwame Anthony Appiah) and royal families.

The River Churn, commonly held to be one of, if not the primary sources of the River Thames, is joined within Coberley by a still longer tributary which has its source in the grounds of the National Star College.
