= Lilian Snelling =

British botanical illustrator

- Born: 8 June 1879; St Mary Cray, Kent
- Died: 12 October 1972 (aged 93); St Mary Cray, Kent
- Occupation: Botanical artist

Lilian Snelling (1879–1972) was "probably the most important British botanical artist of the first half of the 20th century". She was the principal artist and lithographer to Curtis's Botanical Magazine between 1921 and 1952 and "was considered one of the greatest botanical artists of her time" – "her paintings were both detailed and accurate and immensely beautiful". She was appointed MBE in 1954 and was awarded the Victoria Medal in 1955. The standard author abbreviation Snelling is used to indicate this person as the author when citing a botanical name.

== Biography ==
Rhododendron forrestii, illustrated by Lilian Snelling, Curtis's Botanical Magazine, vol. 153 (1929–1930), tab. 9186.

Lilian Snelling was born on 8 June 1879 at Spring Hall, St Mary Cray, Kent into the large family of John Carnell Snelling (1841–1902), brewer, and his wife, Margaret Elizabeth, née Colgalt. She and her sisters were boarders at a school in Tunbridge Wells. In 1915–16 Henry John Elwes commissioned her to paint flowers (which he had gathered on his travels), at his home Colesbourne Park in Gloucestershire.

Snelling worked at the Royal Botanic Garden Edinburgh from 1916 to 1921 painting plant portraits for Sir Isaac Bayley Balfour, Keeper of the Botanic Garden and Professor of Botany at the University of Edinburgh. She studied lithography under Frank Morley Fletcher.

She left in 1921 to work at the Royal Botanic Gardens, Kew as principal artist and lithographer to Curtis's Botanical Magazine which had recently been bought by the RHS where from 1929 she was assisted by Stella Ross-Craig. After 30 years she retired in 1952 having produced over 830 paintings and plates. Volume 169 of Curtis's was dedicated to her: "artist, lithographer and botanical illustrator who with remarkable delicacy of accurate outlines, brilliancy of colour and intricate gradation of tone, has faithfully portrayed most of the plants figured in this magazine from 1922 to 1952."

Her paintings illustrated the supplement to Grove's supplement to Henry John Elwes's Monograph of the Genus Lilium (1934), Stern's, Study of the genus Paeonia (1946) and Fred Stoker's A Book of Lilies (1943.)

In 1954 she was appointed MBE in the Birthday Honours List. In 1955 she was awarded the Victoria Medal, the RHS's highest honour.

In 1959 her work was featured in the Kew Gardens's bicentennial exhibition: "Kew's Aid to Botany over 200 Years" where she was described as "one of a remarkable group of women" who included Stella Ross-Craig, Ann V. Webster and Margaret Stones. She died at her home, 208 High Street, St Mary Cray, Kent, on 12 October 1972.

In 2007 the Royal Botanic Garden Edinburgh (RBGSE) held a ten-week-long exhibition dedicated to her work.

In 2025, a "large collection" of her work, missing from the RBGSE collection, was identified by a Cornish bookseller, Tim Loe and has been donated to the RGBSE Snelling archive which is now accessible and digitised.

== Works ==
- Millais, John Guille (1924). Rhododendrons and the various hybrids Second series. London, New York: Longmans, Green and Co. OCLC 3663850
- Grove, Arthur (1933). A supplement to Elwes' Monograph of the genus Lilium. London: Royal Horticultural Society. OCLC 14200835
- Stoker, Fred (1943). A Book of Lilies. London & New York: King Penguin Books. OCLC 4017629
- Stern, F.C., Snelling, Lilian, & Stella Ross-Craig (1946). Study of the genus Paeonia. London: Royal Horticultural Society.OCLC 5163877
- "Curtis's Botanical Magazine". s 147–169. Royal Horticultural Society. 1922–1952.
