= Colesbourne =

Village and civil parish in England

Coordinates: 51.8180°N 2.00213°W

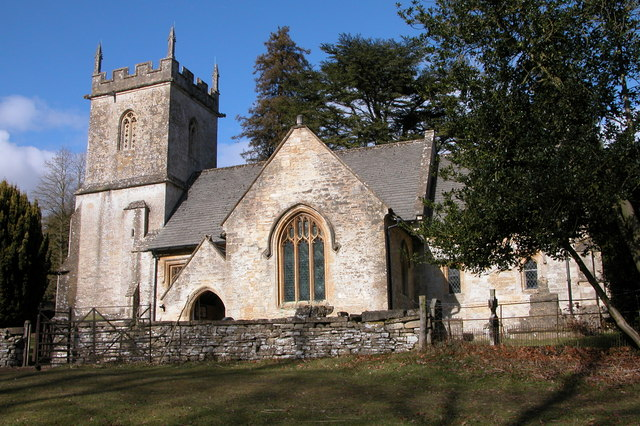
- St James' Church

- Location within Gloucestershire
- OS grid reference: SO999132
  - London: 85 mi (137 km) WNW
- District: Cotswold
- Shire county: Gloucestershire
- Region: South West
- Country: England
- Sovereign state: United Kingdom
- Post town: Cheltenham
- Postcode district: GL53
- Dialling code: 01242
- Police: Gloucestershire
- Fire: Gloucestershire
- Ambulance: South Western
- UK Parliament: North Cotswolds

Colesbourne is a village and civil parish in the Cotswold district of Gloucestershire, England. The village and parish lies within the Cotswolds, a designated Area of Outstanding Natural Beauty.

The village is 10 miles (16 km) east-southeast from the city and county town of Gloucester, and on a 1,000 yards (900 m) east to west section (defined by road entry signs) of the A435 road, which runs locally between Cheltenham 6 miles (10 km) to the north, and Cirencester, 7 miles (11 km) to the south. The civil parish is 4.5 miles (7 km) from north to south. Withington parish is at the north and north-east, with North Cerney and Rendcomb at the south. At the north-west is Coberley parish; at the west, Elkstone; and at the east, Chedworth. The River Churn flows through the centre of the parish and at the north of the village, where it is joined by its tributary Hilcot Brook, which rises in the farther north parish of Dowdeswell.

The village contains The Colesbourne Inn public house, adjacent to a restaurant, a roadside fuel station, and a village farm with a small retail park which includes a cookery school and wine merchant. At the north of the village is the parish church of St James, and north from this is the house of Colesbourne Park estate. Colesbourne is connected by bus to Cheltenham and Swindon.

In 1872 John Marius Wilson recorded Colesbourne as being a parish in the Cirencester district, near the highest source of the River Thames and 3 miles (5 km) east from the Roman road of "Ermine-street", actually Ermin Way (today's A417). Remains of a Roman villa had been found. There was a post office and fifty-two houses in a parish area of 2,200 acres (9 km^{2}). Colesbourne Park was the seat of Henry John Elwes, who was patron of the ecclesiastical parish rectory.

== Landmarks ==
There are sixteen Grade II listed buildings and structures in the parish. In the village is St James' Church, dating to the 12th century, with later 15th-century tower and chancel, which was largely rebuilt in 1852–53 for Henry John Elwes in early Perpendicular style. Within the churchyard is an 18th-century tomb to John Brown (d.1760), Mary Brown (d.1736), and Mary Hayden (d.1809). At the southeast of the church is the base of a medieval cross with the remains of a 17th- or 18th-century stone sundial. To the northeast of the church are three listed mid-19th-century coachhouses built for Henry John Elwes of Colesbourne Park.

On the A435 at the centre of the village is The Colesbourne Inn, a coaching inn dating to 1827, which was "built to serve the new Cheltenham [to] Cirencester turnpike". To the west of the inn is the building listed as the 'Village Institute and Coach House', a c. 1827 "former stables and coach house, now partly meeting hall". Farther west, and adjacent, is the c. 1850 'Village Stores and Post Office'. To the east of The Colesbourne Inn is the c.17th-century Slys Cottage, a former shop and post office. At the northwest of the village is Southbury Farmhouse, dating to the 17th century with 18th-century additions. Adjacent to the farmhouse are mid- to late 18th century threshing barns and stables. At the south of the parish is Rapsgate Park, a late 17th-century "large country house" which was "remodelled and enlarged in the 18th century and altered in 1903". Next to Rapsgate Park is an 18th-century barn. At the west and southeast of the village on the A435 are 19th-century milestones of iron plate.

At the north of the village, beyond St James' Church, and bordered at the east by Hilcot Brook, dammed in 1922 to form a lake, is Colesbourne Park, a house with 30 acres (120,000 m^{2}) of garden and an arboretum, which was home to the botanist and author Henry John Elwes (1846–1922). The park is significant for its display of 250 cultivars of snowdrops, particularly Galanthus elwesii which was identified by and named after Elwes.
