= Henry Elwes =

British retired politician and public servant (born 1935)

Lord Lieutenant of Gloucestershire
- In office 17 February 1992 – 24 October 2010

Personal details
- Born: 24 October 1935 (age 89)
- Education: Eton College
- Occupation: Politician, public servant

Sir Henry William George Elwes KCVO KStJ JP DL (born 24 October 1935) is a retired British politician and public servant. He served as a District and County Councillor in Gloucestershire for 32 years and was Lord Lieutenant of Gloucestershire between 1992 and 2010.

== Early life ==
Elwes was born on 24 October 1935. He was educated at Eton College, a public boys boarding school in Eton near Windsor, Berkshire.

== Military service ==
As part of National Service, Elwes was commissioned in the Scots Guards as a second lieutenant on 4 December 1954. He was given the service number 438925. He transferred to the Army Emergency Reserve of Officers on 24 June 1956 as a second lieutenant with seniority from 4 December 1954. This ended his active service. Also on 24 June 1956, he was granted the acting rank of lieutenant with seniority from 31 May 1956. He moved to the Regular Army Reserve of Officer (Class III) on 27 May 1959, keeping his seniority and assuming the confirmed rank of lieutenant

== Career ==
Elwes was a member of Cirencester Rural District Council from 1959 to 1974. In 1971, he joined Gloucestershire County Council. He served as Vice-Chairman of the council from 1976 to 1983 and in 1991, and Chair from 1983 to 1985. He retired from politics in 1991.

Elwes is the Pro-Chancellor of the University of Gloucestershire. His appointment was announced in March 2012, and he was installed in October 2012.

== Personal life ==
Elwes married Carolyn Cripps in 1962. They live in Colesbourne Park, (known as 'England's Greatest Snowdrop Garden'), an estate owned by his family since 1600. The botanist Henry John Elwes is his great-grandfather.

Elwes suffered serious injuries when he fell three floors through a building he was inspecting. His life was saved by Great Western Air Ambulance Charity and he subsequently made an excellent recovery.

Carolyn Elwes died on 23 December 2022, following a stroke.

== Honours ==
He was nominated for High Sheriff of Gloucestershire in 1976 and 1977. He was appointed High Sheriff for 1979, having been nominated for that year in 1978. On 24 May 1982, he was commissioned a Deputy Lieutenant (DL) of Gloucestershire. He was appointed Lord Lieutenant of Gloucestershire, Queen Elizabeth II's personal representative in the county of Gloucestershire, on 17 February 1992. He served as the first Warden of the Honourable Company of Gloucestershire in 2008-9 and was subsequently granted the title Warden Emeritus.

In April 1992, he was appointed Knight of the Venerable Order of Saint John (KStJ). In the 2009 Queen's Birthday Honours, he was appointed Knight Commander of the Royal Victorian Order (KCVO).
