= Calmsden =

Hamlet in Gloucestershire, England

Coordinates: 51.7780°N 1.9349°W

- View over Calmsden

- Location within Gloucestershire
- Civil parish: North Cerney
- District: Cotswold
- Shire county: Gloucestershire
- Region: South West
- Country: England
- Sovereign state: United Kingdom
- Police: Gloucestershire
- Fire: Gloucestershire
- Ambulance: South Western

Calmsden is a hamlet in the civil parish of North Cerney, in the Cotswold district, in the county of Gloucestershire, England. In 1870-72 the tything had a population of 65.

== Etymology ==
The name of Calmsden is first attested in a thirteenth-century copy of a charter of 852, in the forms Kalemundesdene and Calmundesdene, and in a twelfth-century document in the form Calemundesdene. The name is thought to derive from an Old English personal name Calumund in its genitive form Calumundes, compounded with the noun denu ("valley"). If so, the name once meant "Calumund's valley".
