= Henry John Elwes =

English botanist and entomologist (1846–1922)

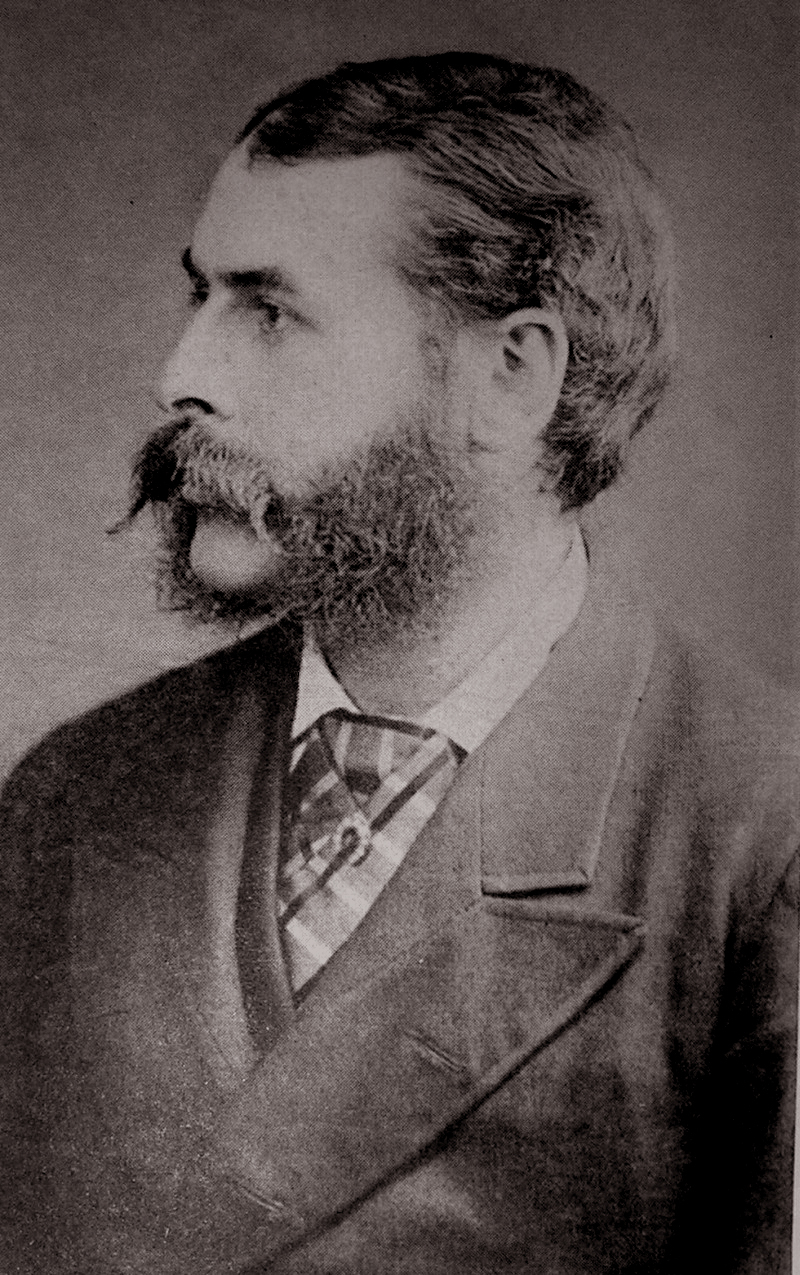
- Henry John as a young man
- Born: 16 May 1846; Cheltenham, Gloucestershire, England
- Died: 26 November 1922 (aged 76); England
- Education: Eton College
- Known for: Galanthus elwesii Eremurus elwesii Genus Lilium
- Awards: Victoria Medal
- Scientific career
- Fields: Botany; Entomology; Lepidoptery; Arboriculture
- Workplaces: Royal Horticultural Society

Henry John Elwes, FRS (16 May 1846 – 26 November 1922) was a British botanist, entomologist, author, lepidopterist, collector and traveller who became renowned for collecting specimens of lilies during trips to the Himalaya and Korea. He was one of the first group of 60 people to receive the Victoria Medal of the Royal Horticultural Society in 1897. Author of Monograph of the Genus Lilium (1880), and The Trees of Great Britain & Ireland (1906–1913) with Augustine Henry, as well as numerous articles, he left a collection of 30,000 butterfly specimens to the Natural History Museum, including 11,370 specimens of Palaearctic butterflies.

== Biography ==
Henry John Elwes was the eldest son of landowner John Henry Elwes of Colesbourne Park near Cheltenham, Gloucestershire. He was described as "a giant of a man, and a very dominating character" with "a booming voice which carried well across his Gloucestershire estate, but was very disconcerting elsewhere." At 13, Elwes was sent to Eton College. In his Memoirs of Travel, Sport and Natural History, published posthumously in 1930, Elwes writes extensively about his Eton time. After the age of 17 he spent at least part of every year abroad, and was sent to tutors in Paris, Brussels and Dresden before spending five years in the Scots Guards from 1865. He apparently did not take soldiering very seriously, being more interested in ornithology which in those days consisted of collecting specimens and eggs. He resigned his commission as a captain in 1869 and lived the life of a travelling naturalist and country gentleman. He visited various parts of the world studying aspects of natural history including ornithology, botany, entomology and big game. He combined horticulture with entomology and big game hunting with estate management and raising prize-winning show livestock, and sitting on the district council. He would later ascribe his interest in plants to his wife, Margaret Susan Lowndes, whom he married in 1871. His first garden was at Miserden, near Cirencester; he later moved to Preston House, Cirencester, before inheriting the Colesbourne estate on the death of his father in 1891.

Margaret Susan and Henry John Elwes had a daughter named Susan Margaret and one son, Henry Cecil (1874–1950).

== Career ==
In 1870, after achieving a diploma in biology with a thesis in natural history, Elwes was made a member of a mission organised by the Geographical Section of the British Association which would take the party through to the Sikkim Himalaya, crossing the border into then-forbidden Tibet. The journey was inspired by reading Joseph Dalton Hooker's Himalayan Journals; it was the first of Elwes' many visits to Asia, and resulted in the major paper "On the geographical distribution of Asiatic birds" read to the Zoological Society in 1873. This was his last major ornithological contribution, as his interest moved on to insects and, increasingly, to plants. It was this visit to the Himalaya that sparked his interest in Lepidoptera; his Sikkim expedition alone yielded nearly 530 records of butterflies.

Elwes' visit to Turkey in 1874 was somewhat fortuitous as it replaced a trip to Cyprus at short notice. It is evident that on this journey Elwes' interest was focused on plants, and he collected numerous species of bulbs. In early April, whilst in the mountains near Smyrna (modern İzmir), he came across Galanthus elwesii, "the fine large snowdrop which now bears my name, and which has since been exported in large quantities from the mountains near Smyrna and has become common in English gardens." Before leaving Turkey he arranged for bulbs to be collected later; the first of the many millions exported ever since.

In 1876 he went back to Darjeeling, to arrange affairs on a tea plantation, of which he had become the owner. Before returning home he made a short trip into the western part of Sikkim. On that trip, on which he collected birds and plants, he was "the only white man".

In 1879–1880 he again visited India, accompanied by Frederick Du Cane Godman and the two visited Allan Octavian Hume before proceeding to Sikkim.

He also made collection trips to the United Provinces, the Punjab, the Central Provinces, Bengal, South Canara and Travancore. Along with T. Edwards, Elwes wrote a monograph on the Oriental Hesperiidae. He also made a trip to the Altai region in 1898. His posthumously published Memoirs (1930) includes a chapter describing his visit to Nepal in 1914, at a time when Europeans were seldom admitted. He also mentions an unnamed companion, now known to be the English naturalist Aubyn Trevor-Battye, who took some of the photographs used to illustrate this chapter. Elwes was famous for his breeding of Nerine and Eremurus. Horticulturalist and garden writer Edward Augustus Bowles noted that he was specially interested in Arisaema, Crinum, Crocus, Fritillaria and Iris, as well as Kniphofia, Paeonia and Yucca. Bowles' memoir in Elwes' posthumous biography offers most information about the Colesbourne garden, but even this is scanty.

In 1902 Elwes presented his collection of 25,000 moths and butterflies to the Natural History Museum, London. In 1920 James John Joicey acquired the "extensive collection of Lepidoptera, (nearly 11370 specimens) with the exception of the Indo-Australian Moths and types of the Palaearctic species, formed by H.J. Elwes". (Much of Joicey's collection was also later donated to the Natural History Museum.)

Elwes presided over the Royal English Arboricultural Society, the Entomological Society, The British Ornithological Union, and the Royal Horticultural Society at various times. He was elected Fellow of the Royal Society in 1897.

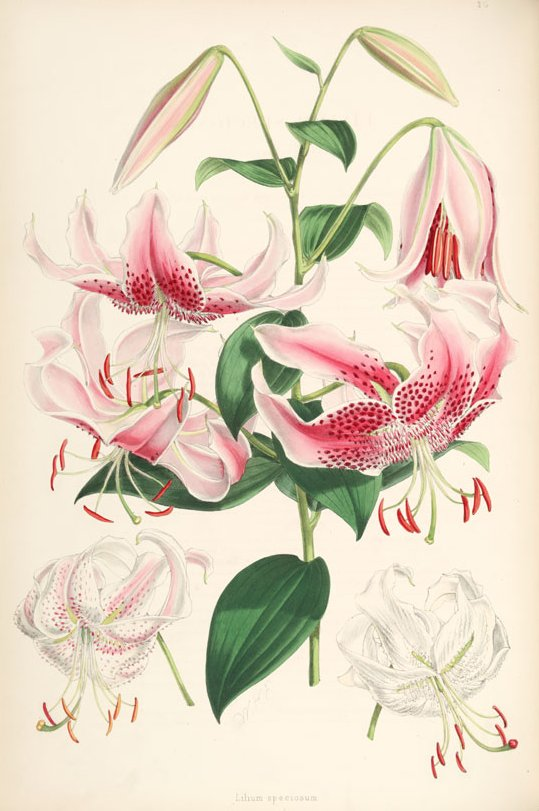
Illustration by W. H. Fitch from Monograph of the Genus Lilium

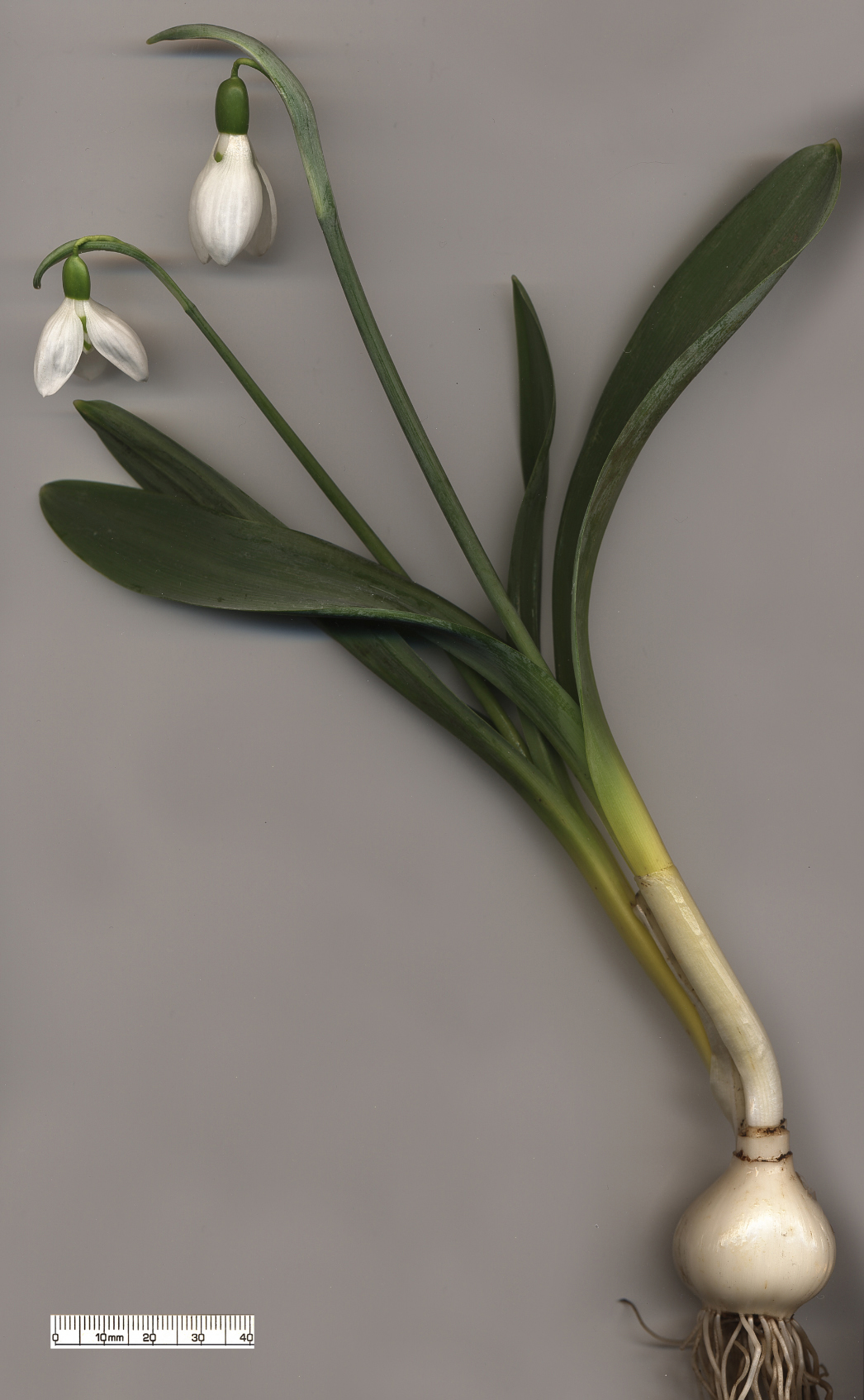
Galanthus elwesii

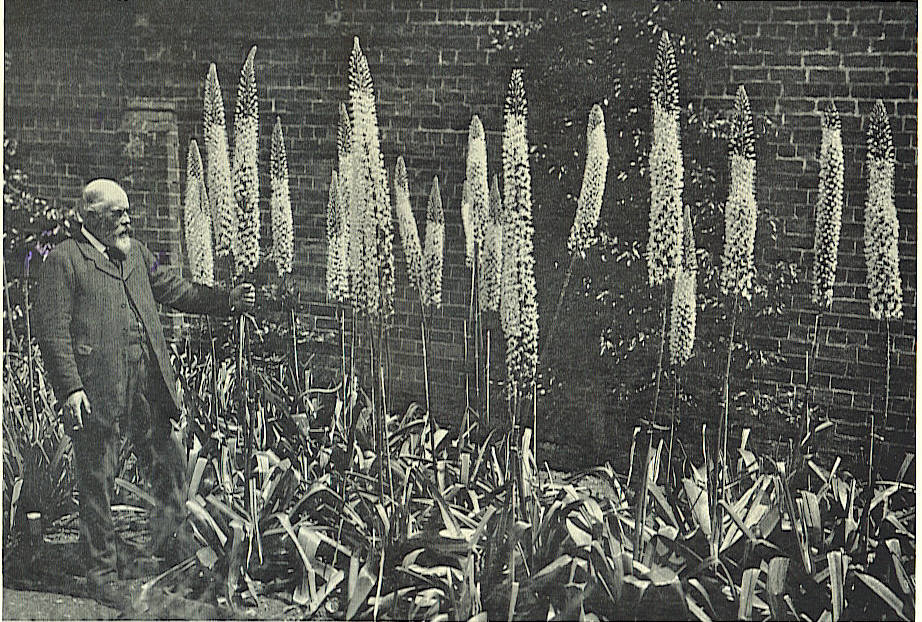
Elwes with Eremurus aitchisonii (formerly
E. elwesii) at Colesbourne. (See Eremurus)

=== Monograph of the Genus Lilium ===
Elwes' horticultural interests largely concentrated on bulbs, and he was said to have the finest collection in private hands. In 1880, he published the magnificent folio Monograph of the Genus Lilium, instigated by Elwes and written with assistance from J. G. Baker at Kew Gardens, but he wrote disappointingly little about his gardening experiences. To ensure that the text was as accurate as possible, and that the range of lilies was as complete as possible, he consulted the greatest botanical experts in the field for help in writing the text. This level of excellence was perpetuated in the illustrations, and Elwes was able to execute his plan to illustrate the monograph with hand-coloured plates by the best available botanical artist, with each member of the genus shown full size. Between March 1877 and May 1880 subscribers received seven parts (at a total cost of seven guineas), illustrated with 48 plates by Walter Hood Fitch (1817–1892). In his garden he was able to grow many of the members of the genus Lilium, becoming a recognised expert in the field. However, Elwes played down his level of knowledge. Some botanists found him a domineering personality. N.D. Riley noted that Elwes "was a giant of a man and a very dominating character." W.T. Stearn noted that his booming voice (which made one commentator quip - "is that a man or a foghorn?") which carried well across his Gloucestershire estate was disconcerting elsewhere.

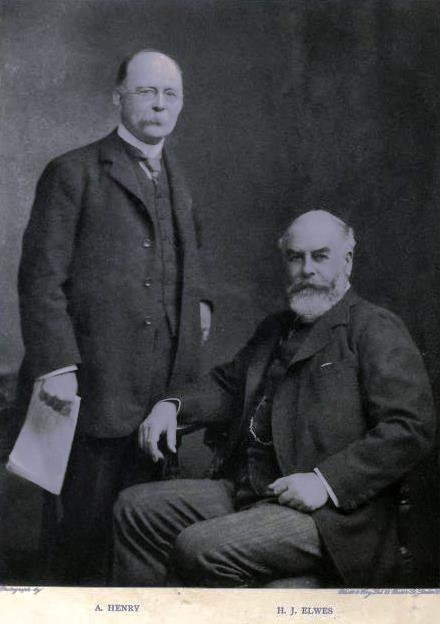
Augustine Henry (left) and Elwes, c. 1906

Shortly before his death in 1922, Elwes asked Arthur Grove, a friend and fellow lily expert, to undertake the task of producing a supplement. Dame Alice Godman, widow of Frederick DuCane Godman (whose first wife was Elwes' sister), agreed to underwrite the cost of the work (co-written by Grove and the botanist A.D. Cotton) and the first seven parts of the supplement were published between July 1933 and February 1940, with 30 hand-coloured lithographed plates, all but two by Lilian Snelling (1879–1972). Two final supplements were published in 1960 and 1962 by William Bertram Turrill.

=== Trees of Great Britain & Ireland ===
From 1900 to 1913 Elwes undertook his greatest work, The Trees of Great Britain & Ireland, in conjunction with the botanist Augustine Henry. Between them, in seven large volumes, they described every species of tree then grown outdoors in the British Isles, and recorded the finest specimens to be seen. Henry's contribution to the book was unique insofar as he devised a system of identification based on leaves and twigs and on the position of buds to aid identification even in the absence of fruit and flowers. Most of these were visited and recorded personally, a process which caused Elwes to wear out two cars. In addition, Elwes undertook numerous journeys abroad to study the trees in the wild, even visiting Chile to see monkey puzzle trees (Araucaria araucana). The work remains a source of information on trees and arboriculture.

== Works ==
- Elwes, Henry John (1877–1880). Monograph of the Genus Lilium. illustrated by W.H. Fitch. London: Taylor and Francis.
- ——; Henry, Augustine (1906–1913). The Trees of Great Britain & Ireland . Edinburgh: Privately Printed – via Wikisource. (7 volumes with 5 volumes of plates and an index)
- —— (1930). Memoirs of Travel, Sport and Natural History . Edited posthumously by E.G. Hawke. London: Ernest Benn Ltd – via Wikisource.

Elwes also published in scientific journals, e.g.

- Elwes, Henry John (1869). "The Bird-Stations of the Outer Hebrides". Ibis. 2. 5: 20–37.
- ——; Buckley, T.E. (1870). "A List of the Birds of Turkey". Ibis. 2. 6: 59–77, 188–201, 327–341. (p.59, p. 188, p. 327)
- —— (1873). "On the Geographical Distribution of Asiatic Birds". Proceedings of the Zoological Society of London. 1873: 645–682.
- —— (1881). "On the Butterflies of Amurland, North China, and Japan". Proceedings of the Zoological Society of London. 1881: 856–916.
- —— (1881). "On a new Crossoptilon". Ibis. 4. 5: 399–401. (description of the Tibetan eared pheasant (Crossoptilon harmani), also called Elwes' eared pheasant; with a Plate)
- —— (1899). "On the Lepidoptera of the Altai Mountains". Transactions of the Entomological Society of London: 295–367. (with Plates XI–XIV)
- —— (c. 1906). "Report by H.J. Elwes, Esq., F.R.S., British Juror for Horticulture and Forestry". Report of His Majesty's Commissioners for the International Exhibition, Saint Louis, 1904: 356–364.
- —— (1906). "On some Japanese and North American Trees suitable for growing in British Woodlands". Transactions of the Royal Scottish Arboricultural Society. 19: 76–82.

== Sources ==
- "Henry John Elwes". Colesbourne Park 'England's Greatest Snowdrop Garden'. Colesbourne Gardens LLP. 2011.
- Balfour, [F.R.S.] (1923). "Henry John Elwes". Bulletin of Miscellaneous Information (Royal Botanic Gardens, Kew). 1923 (1): 36–43. JSTOR 4118545. (previously published in: The Gardeners' Chronicle, 2 December 1922, p. 319–320)
- Elwes, Sir Henry (2015). "Henry John Elwes (1846–1922): The Life and Travels of a Gloucestershire Plantsman and Naturalist" (PDF). Transactions of the Bristol and Gloucestershire Archaeological Society. 133: 11–18. Archived (PDF) from the original on 26 April 2025.
