= List of schools in Cheltenham =

The following is a list of schools in the spa town of Cheltenham. In accordance with the "Eruditio" (Education) part of its motto, Cheltenham is a centre for education.

Facility Name	Type	Coordinates	Notes
Airthrie and Hillfield Dyslexia Trust	primary, private	51°53′52″N 002°05′27″W	
All Saints' Academy	academy	51°53′31″N 002°04′33″W	On the site of former Arle and Kingsmead School
Springbank primary Academy	primary	51°54′42″N 002°07′18″W	Formerly known as Arthur dye school
Balcarras School	secondary, state	51°52′53″N 002°02′39″W	
Battledown Children's Centre	special	51°54′00″N 002°03′09″W	
Belmont School	special	51°53′15″N 002°05′59″W	co-located with Bettridge and Cheltenham Bournside
Benhall Infant School	primary, state	51°53′27″N 002°07′13″W	
Berkhampstead School	primary, private	51°54′09″N 002°03′37″W	
Bettridge School	special	51°53′15″N 002°05′59″W	co-located with Belmont and Cheltenham Bournside
Charlton Kings Infants' School	primary	51°53′00″N 002°03′05″W	
Charlton Kings Junior School	primary	51°52′56″N 002°02′44″W	
Cheltenham Bournside School	secondary, state	51°53′15″N 002°05′59″W	co-located with Belmont and Bettridge
Cheltenham College	secondary, private	51°53′32″N 002°04′33″W	
Cheltenham College Junior School	primary	51°53′22″N 002°04′32″W	
Cheltenham Ladies' College	secondary, private	51°53′51″N 002°04′53″W	
Chosen Hill School	secondary, state		
Christ Church Church of England Primary School	primary	51°54′02″N 002°05′27″W	
Dean Close Preparatory School	primary, private	51°53′38″N 002°05′56″W	
Dean Close School	secondary, private	51°53′34″N 002°06′17″W	
Dunalley Primary School	primary	51°54′30″N 002°04′15″W	
Gardners Lane Primary School	primary	51°54′48″N 002°05′13″W	
Glenfall: Pre-School; Primary School	nursery; primary	51°53′13″N 002°02′33″W; 51°53′13″N 002°02′33″W	
Gloucester Road Primary School	primary	51°54′17″N 002°05′25″W	
Gloucestershire College	further	51°54′06″N 002°07′05″W	
Greatfield Park Primary School	primary	51°52′51″N 002°06′28″W	
Hester's Way Primary School	primary	51°54′37″N 002°06′37″W	
Holy Apostles Church of England Primary School	primary	51°53′47″N 002°03′22″W	
Holy Trinity Church of England Primary School	primary	51°54′07″N 002°04′06″W	
Lakeside Primary School	primary	51°53′17″N 002°06′59″W	
Leckhampton Church of England Primary School	primary	51°52′37″N 002°04′49″W	
Lynworth Primary School	primary	51°54′32″N 002°03′05″W	This school has now closed & has become Oakwood Primary School
National Star College	special	51°50′59″N 002°05′01″W	
Naunton Park Primary School	primary	51°53′06″N 002°04′24″W	
Pate's Grammar School	secondary, state	51°54′25″N 002°07′01″W	
Oakwood Primary School	primary	51°54′32″N 002°03′05″W	
Pittville School	secondary	51°54′41″N 002°03′52″W	
Prestbury St. Mary's Church of England: Infant School; Junior School	primary	51°54′36″N 002°02′43″W	
Richard Pate School	primary, private	51°52′28″N 002°04′13″W	
Rowanfield: Infant School; Junior School	primary	51°54′19″N 002°06′11″W	
St. Edward's Junior School	primary, private	51°53′29″N 002°03′05″W	
St. Edward's School	secondary, private	51°53′09″N 002°03′37″W	
St. James Church of England Primary School	primary	51°53′09″N 002°05′38″W	
St. Johns Church of England Primary School	primary	51°53′55″N 002°04′08″W	
St. Marks Church of England Junior School	primary, state	51°53′29″N 002°07′09″W	
St. Thomas More Catholic Primary School	primary	51°54′13″N 002°07′09″W	
Sandford School	special	51°51′02″N 002°03′04″W	
Sir Charles Playgroup	nursery	51°54′01″N 002°07′00″W	
Swindon Village Primary School	primary, (UK)51°55′26″N 002°05′27″W		
The Catholic School of Saint Gregory the Great	primary	51°54′08″N 002°04′56″W	
The Ridge	special	51°54′17″N 002°03′04″W	
University of Gloucestershire: Francis Close Hall Campus; Park Campus; Pittville Student Village	higher	51°54′23″N 002°04′45″W; 51°54′31″N 002°04′59″W; 51°53′15″N 002°05′19″W; 51°54′49″N 002°03′49″W	
Whaddon Primary School	primary	51°54′17″N 002°03′04″W	This school has now closed & has become The Ridge

== See also ==
List of schools in Gloucestershire
