= Cowley, Gloucestershire =

Village in Gloucestershire, England

Coordinates: 51.83111°N 2.05187°W

Cowley
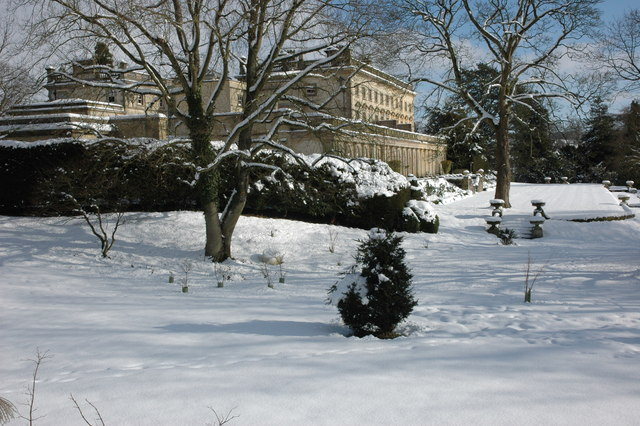
- Cowley Manor

- Location within Gloucestershire
- Population: 337 (2011)
- OS grid reference: SO963147
- Civil parish: Cowley
- District: Cotswold
- Shire county: Gloucestershire
- Region: South West
- Country: England
- Sovereign state: United Kingdom
- Post town: CHELTENHAM
- Postcode district: GL53
- Dialling code: 01242
- Police: Gloucestershire
- Fire: Gloucestershire
- Ambulance: South Western
- UK Parliament: North Cotswolds
- Website: Cowley Parish Council

Cowley is a village and civil parish in the Cotswold District of Gloucestershire, England. It lies between the A417 and A435 roads between Cheltenham and Cirencester in the Churn Valley, and in 2011 had a population of 333. The name originates from 'cow' and 'leigh', literally meaning cow pasture.

The Grade II* listed parish church of St. Mary lies next to the Manor and dates from the 12th century. Cowley Manor, owned by the Horlick family, is currently used as a country hotel. The village pub is the Green Dragon, which is not far from the Gloucestershire Girl Guides HQ, Deerpark. Cowley also has a Sunday cricket team, which plays at the ground towards the west side of the village near the Green Dragon pub. The village hall, which used to be the old school house, was sold by the parish council and converted into a private residence.

The village consists of approximately 40 houses, scattered around a circular road that curls up the edge of a small valley and then runs back down the bottom of the V shape. The 'back lane' has only two houses on it compared to the higher lane that holds most of the residents. Further up the small valley is a collection of three houses on a hilltop. The entrance to Cowley from the A435 is through two large pillars, either side of the road entrance, existing from the entrance of the Cowley Manor estate. The local town and shops are in Cheltenham, and many people who live in the village work in Cheltenham.

The village falls in Ermin electoral ward. The total ward population taken in the 2011 census was 1,793.

Attractions around the area include Cirencester, Shabb Hill scenic view, Crickley Hill Country Park, and Cheltenham. The village is popular with ramblers and general Cotswold visitors.
