= Seven Springs, Gloucestershire =

Hamlet in the Cotswolds, England

Coordinates: 51°51′04″N 2°02′59″W

Seven Springs
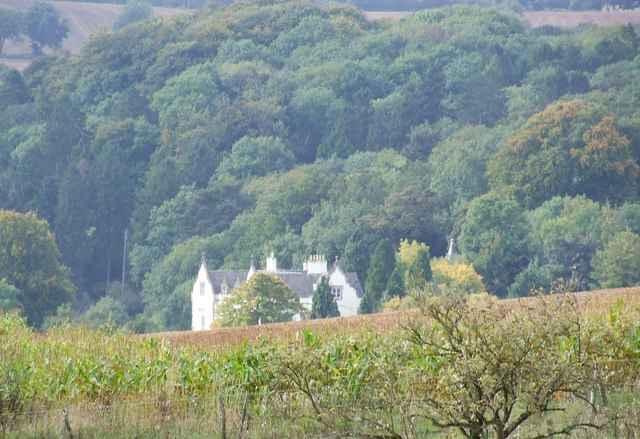
- Seven Springs

- Location within Gloucestershire
- Civil parish: Coberley
- District: Cotswold
- Shire county: Gloucestershire
- Region: South West
- Country: England
- Sovereign state: United Kingdom
- Post town: Cheltenham
- Postcode district: GL53
- Dialling code: 01242
- Police: Gloucestershire
- Fire: Gloucestershire
- Ambulance: South Western
- UK Parliament: North Cotswolds

Seven Springs is a hamlet in the heavily wooded parish of Coberley in the Cotswold District of Gloucestershire in England, 4 miles (6.4 km) south of Cheltenham. Including the intersection of the A435 and A436 roads, it has the sources of the River Churn, which flows south across almost a full cross-section of the Cotswolds, through Cirencester, and joins the Thames near Cricklade.

== Source of the Thames ==
Seven Springs features in the long-running discussion over the true source of the River Thames.

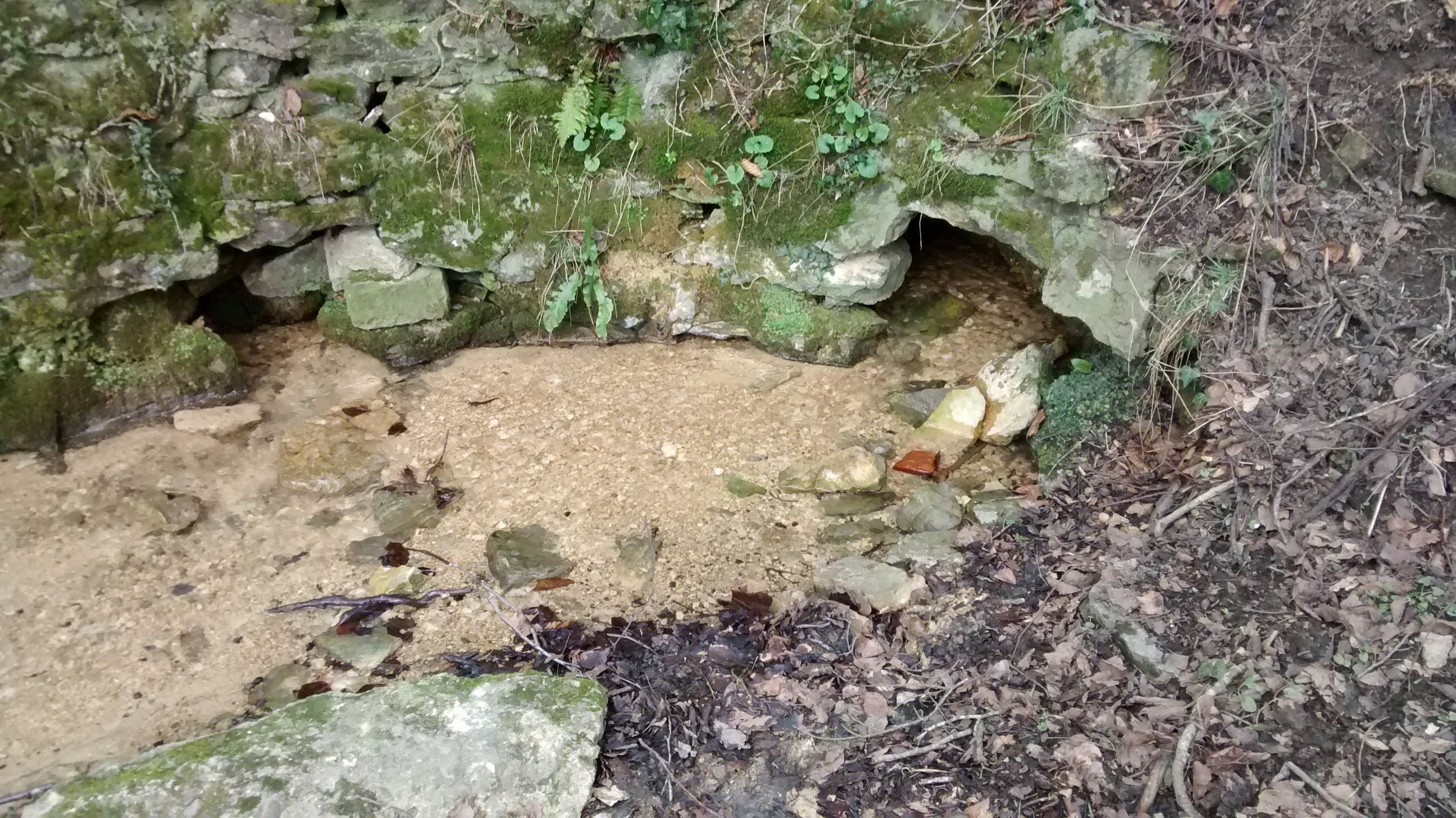
Point of emergence of spring water

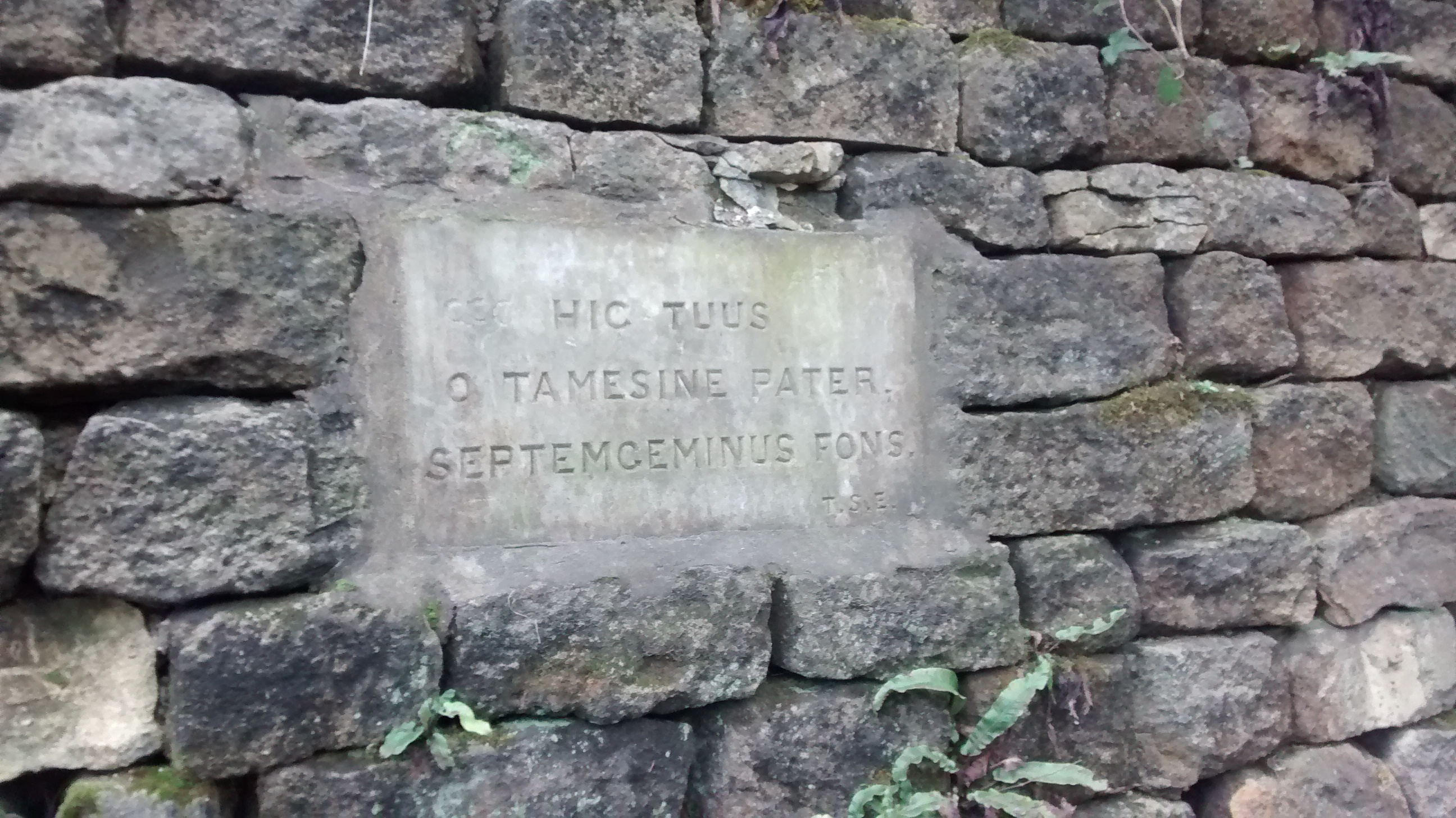
Latin inscription over exit point

Two plaques at the site read "Hic tuus o Tamesine Pater septemgeminus fons" (Latin for "Here, O Father Thames, is your sevenfold spring"). Seven Springs is further from the mouth of the Thames than the medieval preferred source at Thames Head near Kemble.

In 2012 Coberley Parish Council posted a notice, on site, that "Seven Springs is certainly one of the sources of the River Thames and is held by many to be the ultimate source." The notice adds that the site is the source of the River Churn, which flows into the Thames at Cricklade, and as its location is furthest from the mouth of the Thames, it adds some 14 miles (23 km) to the length of the river flow. Furthermore, the springs at the site flow throughout the year, whereas those at the official source of Thames Head are only seasonal. The Churn/Thames may therefore be regarded as the longest natural river flow in the United Kingdom, beating its nearest rival, the River Severn by 9 miles (14 km), if stretches with a high degree of saltwater are taken as part of the river. If this is seen as correct, the Thames may be longer than the River Shannon (224 miles/360.5 km), making it the longest river in the British Isles.

The stream from Seven Springs is joined within Coberley by a still longer, less reliable tributary, which amounts to the longest headwater of the Thames river system. Its source is in the grounds of the National Star College in the parish of Ullenwood.
