= North Cerney =

Coordinates: 51.7657°N 1.96377°W

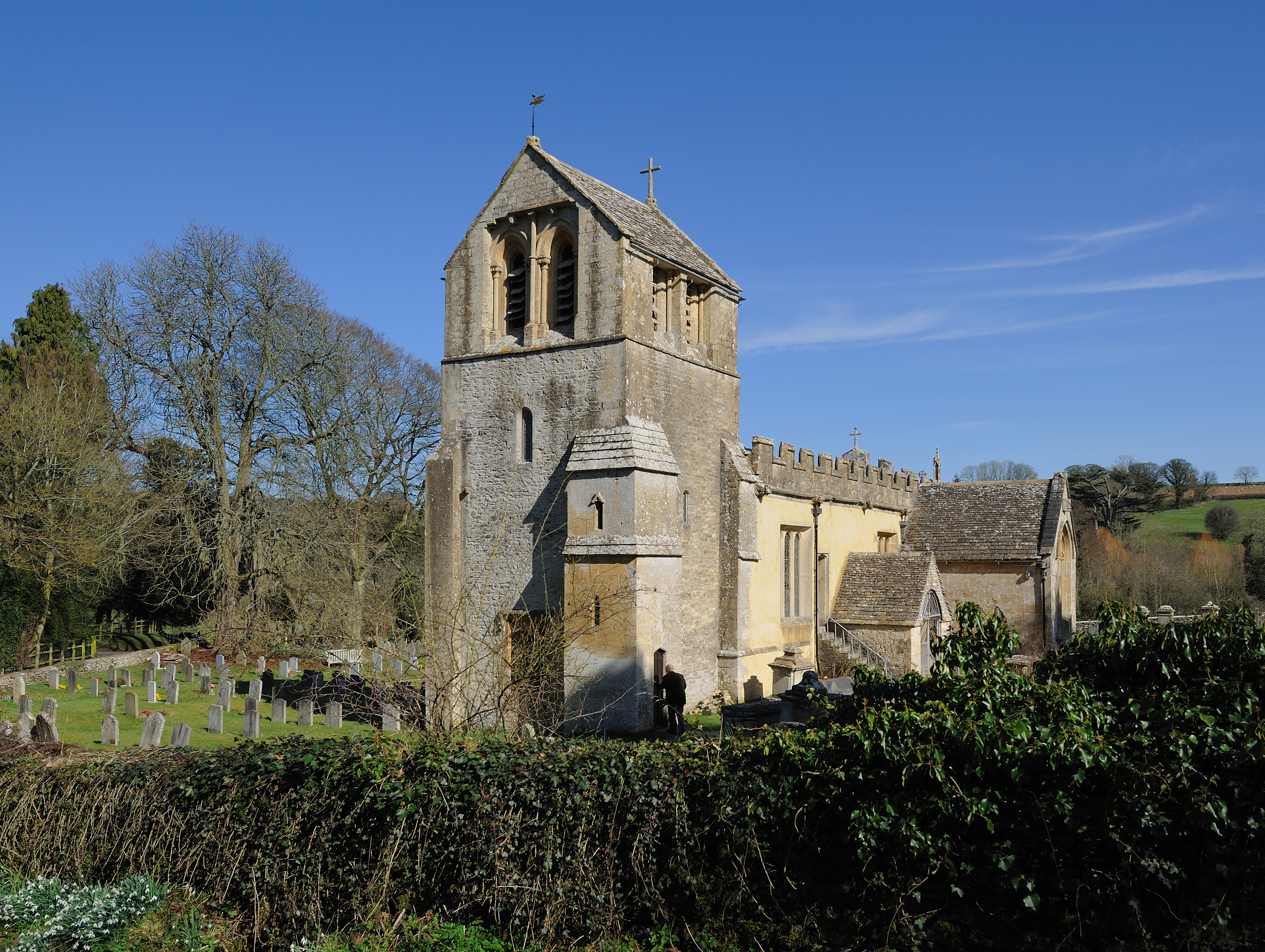
- All Saints', North Cerney Parish Church

- Location within Gloucestershire
- OS grid reference: SP0207
- Civil parish: North Cerney
- District: Cotswold
- Shire county: Gloucestershire
- Region: South West
- Country: England
- Sovereign state: United Kingdom
- Post town: CIRENCESTER
- Postcode district: GL7
- Dialling code: 01285
- Police: Gloucestershire
- Fire: Gloucestershire
- Ambulance: South Western
- UK Parliament: North Cotswolds
- Website: Parish Council

North Cerney is a village and civil parish in the English county of Gloucestershire, and lies within the Cotswolds, a range of hills designated an Area of Outstanding Natural Beauty. The village is 4 miles (6.4 km) north of Cirencester within the Churn Valley.

The parish also includes the villages of Woodmancote and Calmsden.

The North Cerney Manor was in the possession of the Bishop of York from the Conqueror's time until 1545 when it was returned to the Crown.

North Cerney is represented by the county councillor for Northleach division and the district councillor for Churn Valley & Chedworth ward on Cotswold District Council. The County Council estimated in 2010 there were 556 people living in the village.

The village has a pub, The Bathurst Arms, a primary school, North Cerney C of E Primary School, and a cricket club, North Cerney Cricket Club.

== History ==
=== Etymology ===
The name Cerney is first attested in Old English in 852 CE, when it was recorded that King of the Mercians granted lands in Cerney to a man called Alfeah. It is again attested in charters of the 990s associated with King Aethelred II, in the form æt Cyrne, meaning 'on the River Churn' (the origin of whose own name is ancient, but whose etymology is obscure). To this was added the Old English word ēa ('river'), first attested in the form Cernei (and variant spellings like it) in the Domesday Book of 1086. Thus Cerney meant 'the river Churn'. The addition of the word North, distinguishing the settlement from South Cerney, is first attested in 1269.

=== Red Arrows in 1976 ===
On 16 February 1976, as it approached RAF Kemble, Red Arrows Gnat XP531 cut the electricity cable of a transmission pylon, on land owned by Sir John Langman. The pilot was Flt Lt Mike Phillips. Both pilots ejected safely.

== Church of All Saints ==
The early 12th-century Church of All Saints is English Heritage Grade I listed for its special architectural and historic interest. Restorations and excavations on the site have revealed several 12th-century artifacts that have been subsequently incorporated into the later works. Similarly, the Church's original 12th-century stone altar was rediscovered and returned to the church in 1912. There is a 14th-century churchyard cross in the grounds as well as numerous ancient grave memorials.

A fire in the 14th century severely damaged the Norman-era roof as well as some walls. The church was fully restored through the wealth of the Cotswold wool industry and the determination of the rector William Whitchurch. A stained-glass window in the church memorialises him for his efforts. Despite the fire, some Norman work in the tower, porch and chancel is still evident along with two other 14th-century stained glass windows. The south wall exterior shows some unusual scratch markings of a manticore and a leopard. The purpose of the markings is unknown but thought perhaps to have been the work of masons during one of the expansions. The Lady Chapel has tombs of the Croome family of Cerney House.

== Cerney House ==
Cerney House is the village manor house, next to the church. The current building dates from 1660 and was built for the Rich family. It was remodelled in the 1780s. From 1810 it was owned by the Croome family and later the De la Hayes. A later occupant was the businessman Kenneth de Courcy. From 1983, it was the home of Sir Michael and Lady Angus and is still owned by their family. The gardens are open to the public.

== Notable people ==
- Peter Goldsmith Medd, Vicar of North Cerney, 1876–1908
