= National Star College =

College in Gloucestershire, England

Coordinates: 51°50′59″N 2°5′01″W

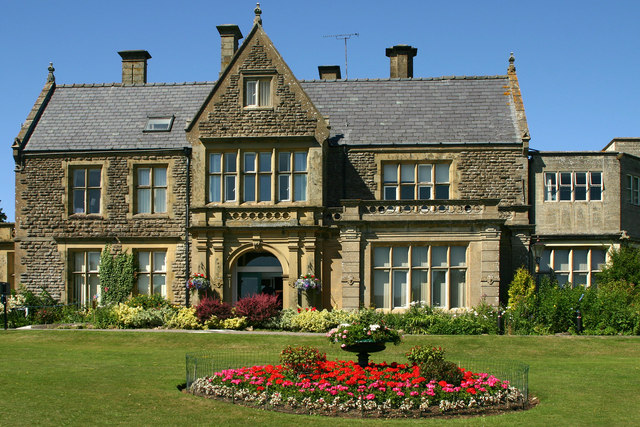
Ullenwood National Star College

The National Star College (previously known as the Star Centre) is an independent specialist further education college for people with physical disabilities, acquired brain injuries and associated learning difficulties. It is based at Ullenwood Manor in the village of Ullenwood, near the spa town of Cheltenham, Gloucestershire.

It is constituted as a company and registered charity under English law, using the official name National Star Centre for Disabled Youth.

In June 2012, the National Star College received an 'Outstanding' rating from Ofsted. The outstanding rating was continued in the 2018 inspection.

== History ==
On 10 May 1967, the Star Centre, as it was then known, opened its doors for the first time with 10 students and 26 members of staff.

The first headmaster was Geoffrey Tudor, deputy, Mr. John Sheeran, and the bursar, Mr. Bill Rosters. Tewkesbury Register - Friday 19 May 1967.

The Star Centre was originally established as a charity to offer support and education to children whose lives had been affected by thalidomide - a drug that was used to treat morning sickness in pregnant women but which in numerous cases caused serious side effects for the foetus.

During the 1960s, opportunities for further education and vocational training did not exist for school leavers with learning disabilities, so it was decided that the College would be solely for over-16s; which has continued through to today.

In 1970, the Star Centre became the National Star Centre for Disabled Youth to reflect the fact that students came from all over the UK and then in 2002, it received its present name, the National Star College.

== Services today and rationale ==
The college is a further education college focussing on literacy, numeracy, communication and ICT for disabled people. Courses are provided both as residential and as day courses.

Advances in medical care over the last 45 years have meant an increase in the survival of premature babies, and more children surviving major illness and accidents, which often causes lifelong severe disabilities. There has also been improved integration of students with less severe disabilities into mainstream educational provision, meaning National Star College has moved towards even more specialist provision.

Most of the students at National Star College today require very high levels of personal support, 80% are wheelchair users, over 50% require speech and language therapy, 20% use a communication aid, and 13% have a life-limiting condition.

The changing and more complex needs of the students meant that the College needed to change and grow. A development plan to expand and improve all of the College’s facilities through a combination of new buildings, conversion, and refurbishment was put into place and in 2007 the College launched the £15.4million ‘Star Appeal’ round of fundraising. The appeal was successful and building work commenced in 2010, with the first phase completed in June 2011.

June 2012 Ofsted Inspection
Section	Result
Overall Effectiveness of Provision	Grade 1 (Outstanding)
Capacity to make and sustain improvement	Grade 1 (Outstanding)
Outcomes for learners	Grade 1 (Outstanding)
The quality of provision	Grade 1 (Outstanding)
Leadership and Management	Grade 1 (Outstanding)

== Estate and grounds ==
Ullenwood Manor was built around 1850 as a private residence, and subsequently used as preparatory school for boys. It is located in a secluded woodland location in the hills above Leckhampton, Cheltenham.

Modern college grounds include a private 18-hole golf course used by Ullenwood Manor Golfing Society. The manor building also provides conference facilities available for use by the general public.

=== New Facility ===
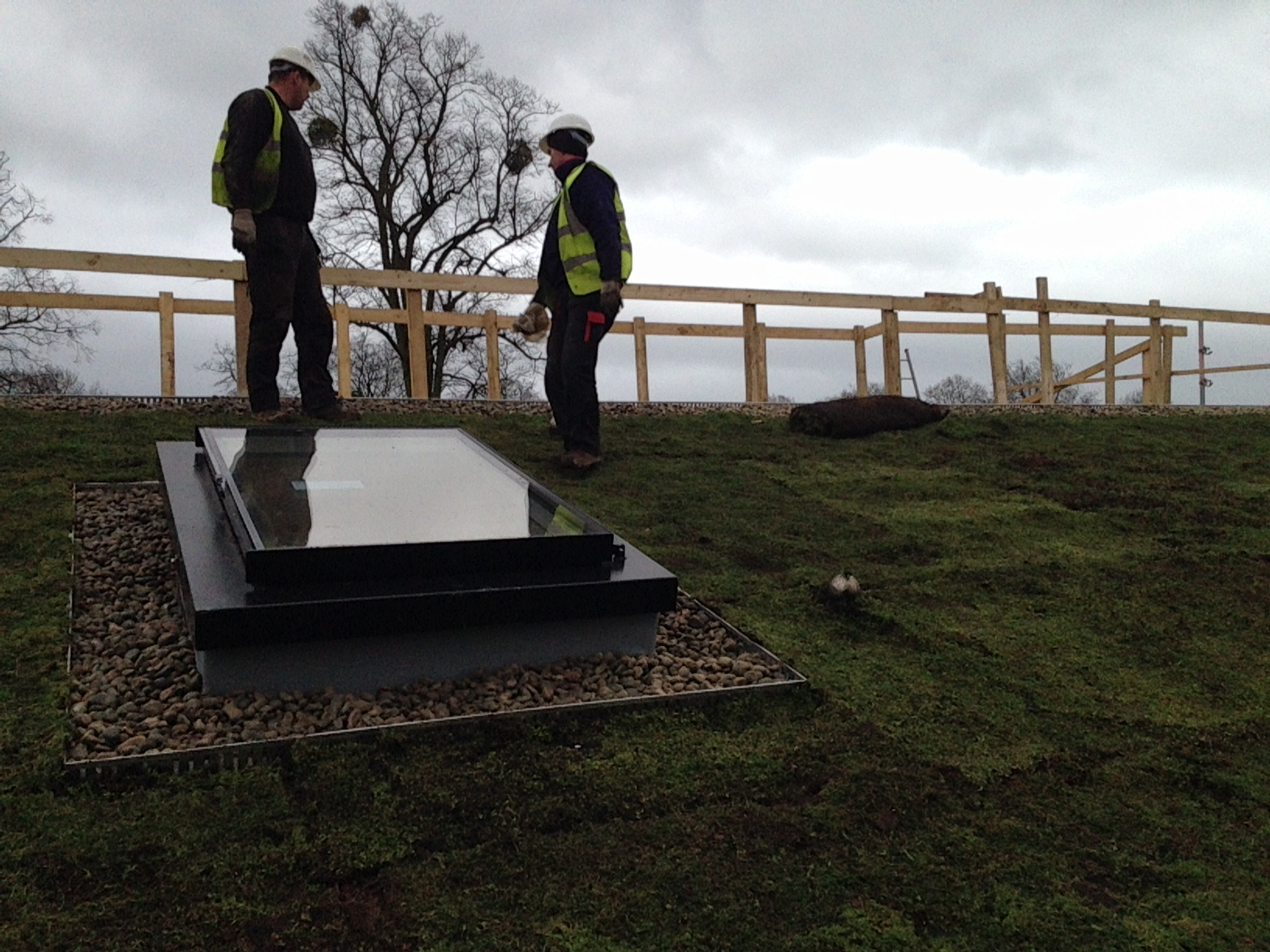
Sky Garden green roof installers putting the finishing touches to the sedum roof.

The new £6m development in Pittville features student accommodation and a learning and activities centre to replace the outdated accommodation in an ideal location. Located close enough to the Cheltenham's centre but on the edge of the prestigious Pittville Park, the students will get a healthy mix of town and green space.

Local building contractor Speller Metcalfe completed the works on the project, whilst making every effort to preserve the existing ecology of the landscape and adding to it with extra planting and landscaping. Another local company, Sky Garden, added four green roofs to the buildings to increase the biodiversity of the site. The sedum roof will not only help with wildlife but also insulate the buildings and reduce heating expenses for the residents. The Green roofs were installed on a 15 degree slope and required specialist retention batons to stop the system from sliding off the roof.

== See also ==
- List of schools in Cheltenham
- List of schools in Gloucestershire
