= Thames Head =

Group of seasonal springs in Gloucestershire, England

Coordinates: 51.694262°N 2.029724°W

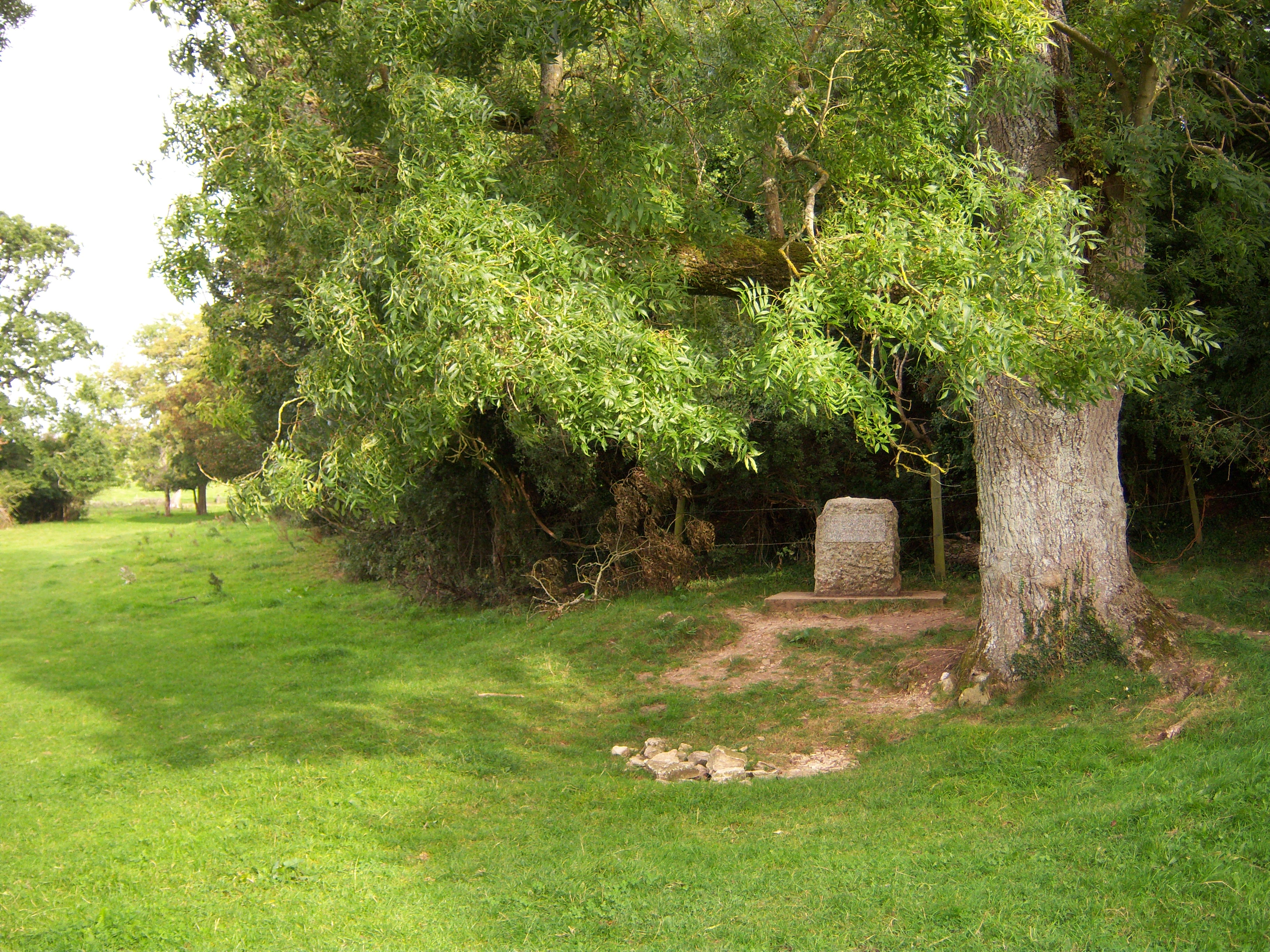
A stone-lined springhead in Trewsbury Mead, with the marker stone above it, taken 2007. Dry at the time of taking the picture, the Thames would otherwise flow towards the photographer.

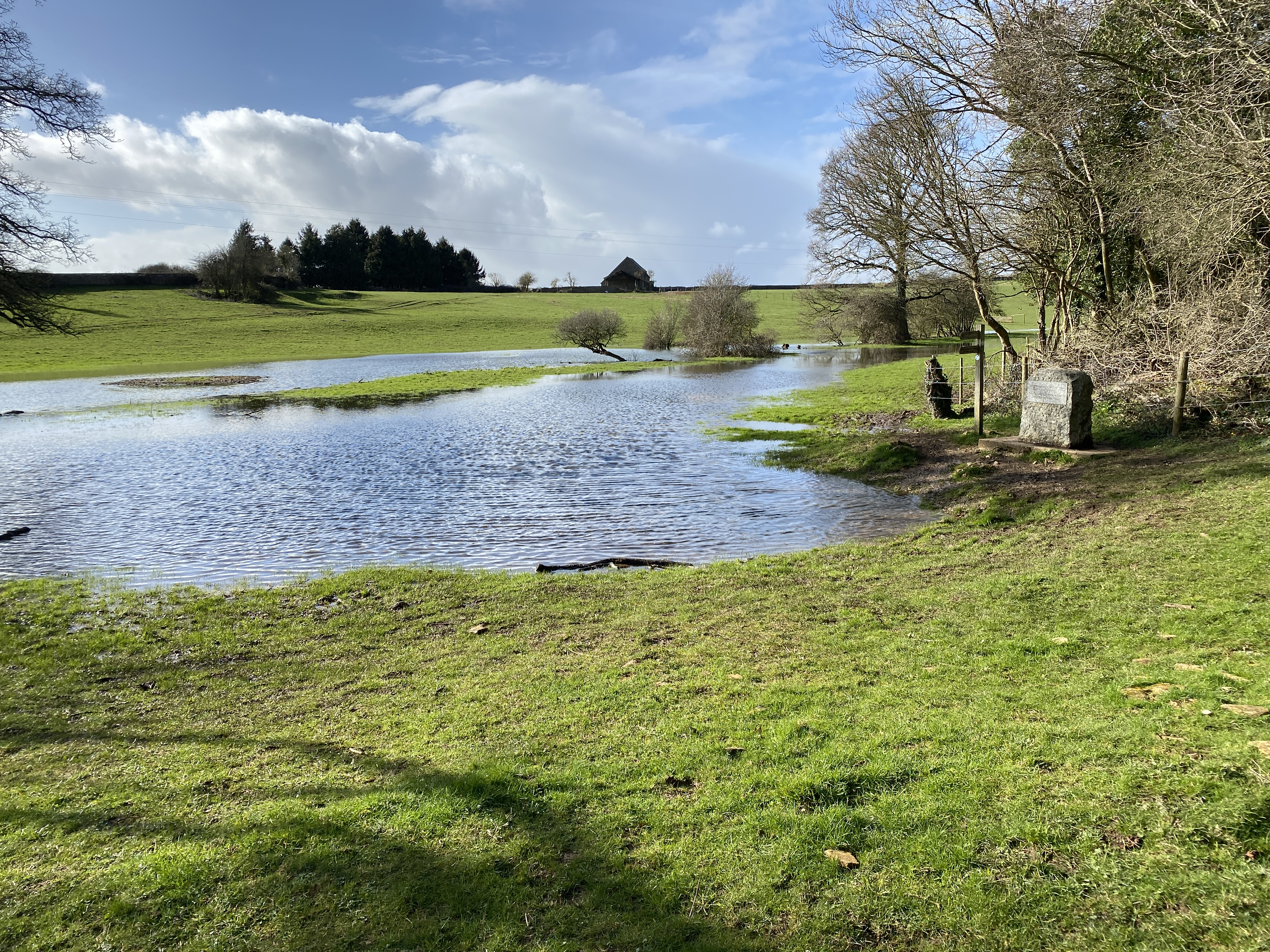
Thames Head in flood in March 2020

Thames Head is a group of seasonal springs that arise in the Cotswolds, in the county of Gloucestershire, England. Their location is in fields near the villages of Coates and Kemble, on either side of the A433 road, about three miles south-west of the town of Cirencester. The spring water comes from the limestone aquifers of the Cotswolds. One or more of these springs are traditionally identified as the source of the River Thames.

In actuality, the source of the River Thames does not have a fixed location – rather, it changes according to the level of the groundwater in the limestone. In dry periods, the groundwater level falls, causing the Thames Head springs to dry up and the river to begin lower down in its course. In wet conditions, the groundwaters rise and the river can begin at one of the Thames Head springs. The spring known as Lyd Well, located south of the A433 (grid reference ST989984), is often where the river starts. In 2011, the lowest recorded start of the Thames was just upstream of Ashton Keynes, which is over six miles (ten kilometres) downstream from Thames Head. During the 2022 United Kingdom heat wave, the source dried up completely, shifting five miles (eight kilometres) downstream to Somerford Keynes.

The highest springs of Thames Head are located north of the A433 road (Fosse Way section), in a meadow called Trewsbury Mead. One of these springs is marked with an inscribed stone marker, located 360 feet (110 m) above sea level at grid reference ST980994. Below it, the springhead itself is in a hollow that has been lined with stones. The springs continue immediately south of the A433.

The Ordnance Survey identifies Thames Head as the source of the Thames on its maps and the UK's Environment Agency follows their precedent. However, there is also a long-standing alternative view that the real source of the Thames is on a different headstream entirely: at Seven Springs, Gloucestershire, the source of the River Churn, which is officially a tributary of the Thames that joins the Thames at Cricklade and which is longer than the course of the Thames from Thames Head to Cricklade.

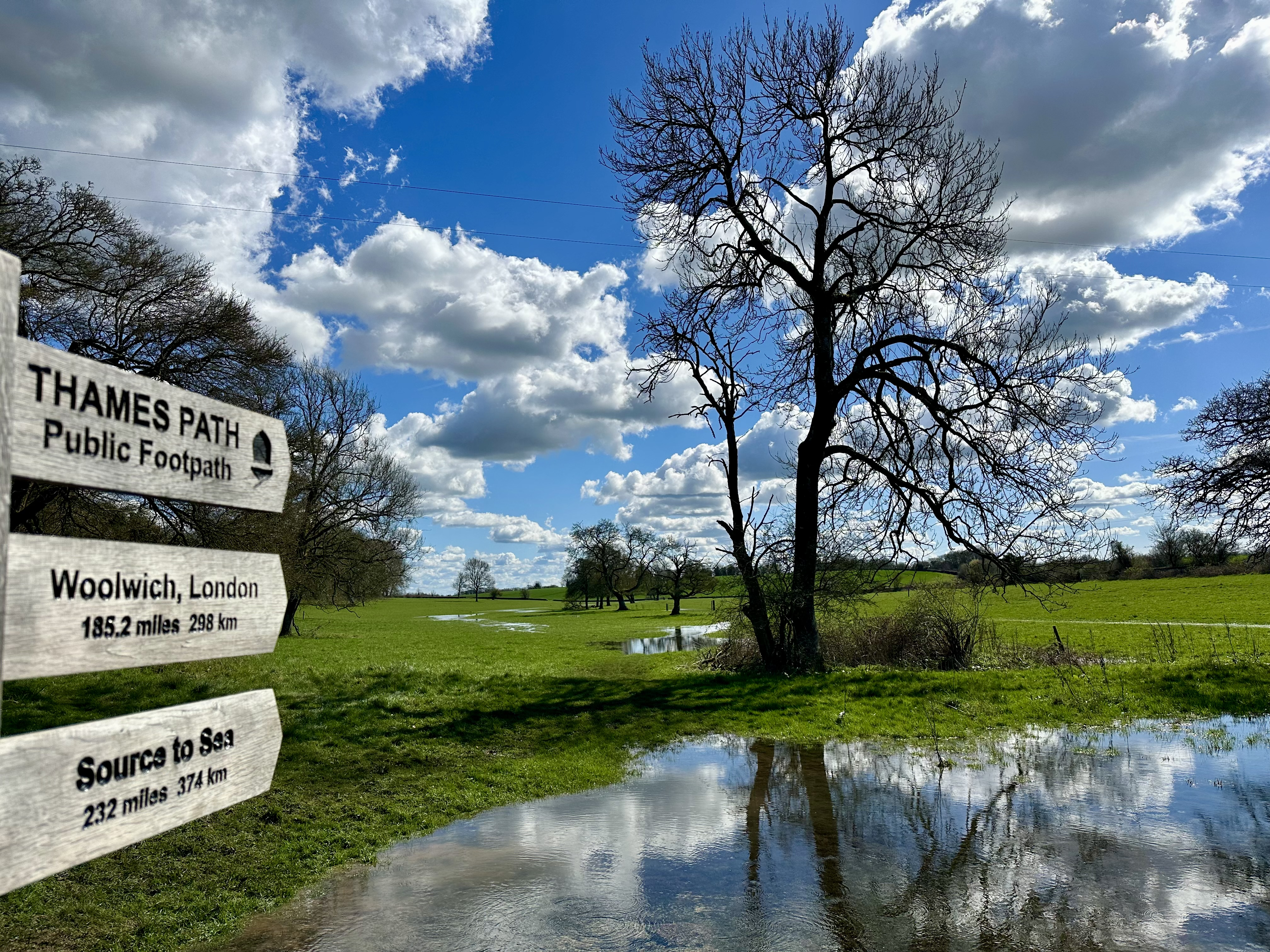
Thames Head in flood looking downstream

== Marker stone ==
The marker stone in Trewsbury Mead bears the inscription:

THE CONSERVATORS OF THE RIVER THAMES
1857–1974
THIS STONE WAS PLACED HERE TO MARK THE
SOURCE OF THE RIVER THAMES

== Thames source dispute ==
The source of the River Thames is disputed. The Environment Agency, the Ordnance Survey and other authorities have the source of the Thames as Thames Head. Others hold that the true source of the Thames is at Seven Springs, Gloucestershire, some 11 miles (18 km) farther north, and east of Gloucester. Seven Springs is officially the source of the River Churn, which is a tributary of the Thames that joins at Cricklade. As it is further from the mouth of the Thames than Thames Head, the adoption of Seven Springs as its source would make the Thames the longest river in the UK.

== See also ==
- Winterbourne
