= Woodmancote, Cirencester =

Village in Gloucestershire, England

Coordinates: 51.775°N 2.00°W

Woodmancote
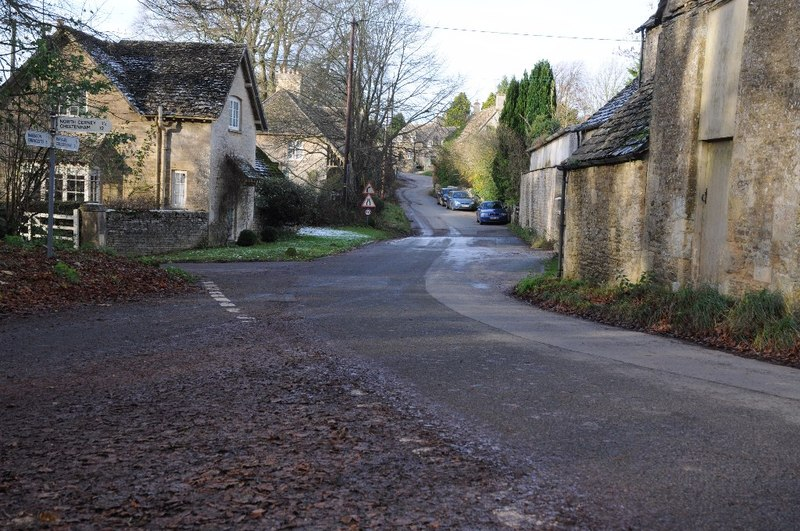
- Woodmancote

- Location within Gloucestershire
- OS grid reference: SP0008
- Civil parish: North Cerney
- District: Cotswold
- Shire county: Gloucestershire
- Region: South West
- Country: England
- Sovereign state: United Kingdom
- Post town: CIRENCESTER
- Postcode district: GL7
- Dialling code: 01285
- Police: Gloucestershire
- Fire: Gloucestershire
- Ambulance: South Western
- UK Parliament: North Cotswolds

Woodmancote is a Cotswolds village near Cirencester, Gloucestershire, England. The village lies just off the A435. The village is 0.2 square miles (52 ha) in area.

The hamlet is typically made up of Cotswold stone cottages, a single Mansion house and a mix of some more modern dwellings and is surrounded by farm land. Woodmancote has no pub, shop, church or other facilities, the nearest being Rendcomb or North Cerney.

In 1870–72, John Marius Wilson's Imperial Gazetteer of England and Wales described Woodmancote like this:

WOODMANCOTE, a tything in North Cerney parish, Gloucester; 4¼ miles NNW of Cirencester. Pop., 256.
