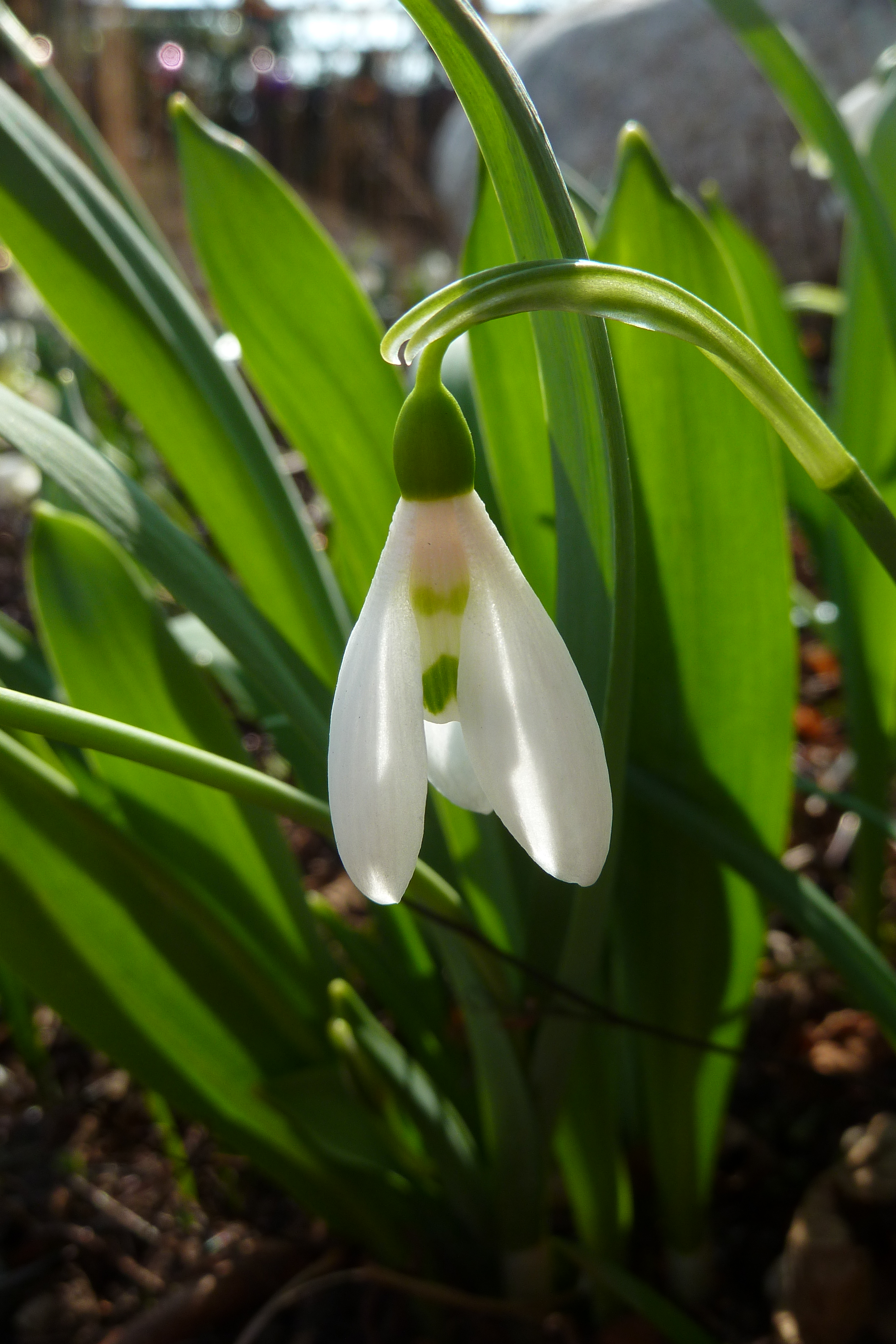

Conservation status
- Data Deficient (IUCN 3.1)
- CITES Appendix II

Scientific classification
- Kingdom: Plantae
- Clade: Embryophytes
- Clade: Tracheophytes
- Clade: Spermatophytes
- Clade: Angiosperms
- Clade: Monocots
- Order: Asparagales
- Family: Amaryllidaceae
- Subfamily: Amaryllidoideae
- Genus: Galanthus
- Species: G. elwesii

Binomial name
- Galanthus elwesii Hook.f.

Synonyms
- Synonyms: Chianthemum elwesii (Hook.f.) Kuntze; Chianthemum graecum (Orph. ex Boiss.) Kuntze; Galanthus bulgaricus Velen. nom. inval.; Galanthus globosus Burb.; Galanthus gracilis subsp. baytopii Zeybek; Galanthus graecus Orph. ex Boiss.; Galanthus maximus Velen.; Galanthus melihae (Zeybek) E.Sauer & Zeybek; Galanthus nivalis subsp. elwesii (Hook.f.) Gottl.-Tann.

= Galanthus elwesii =

Species of flowering plant

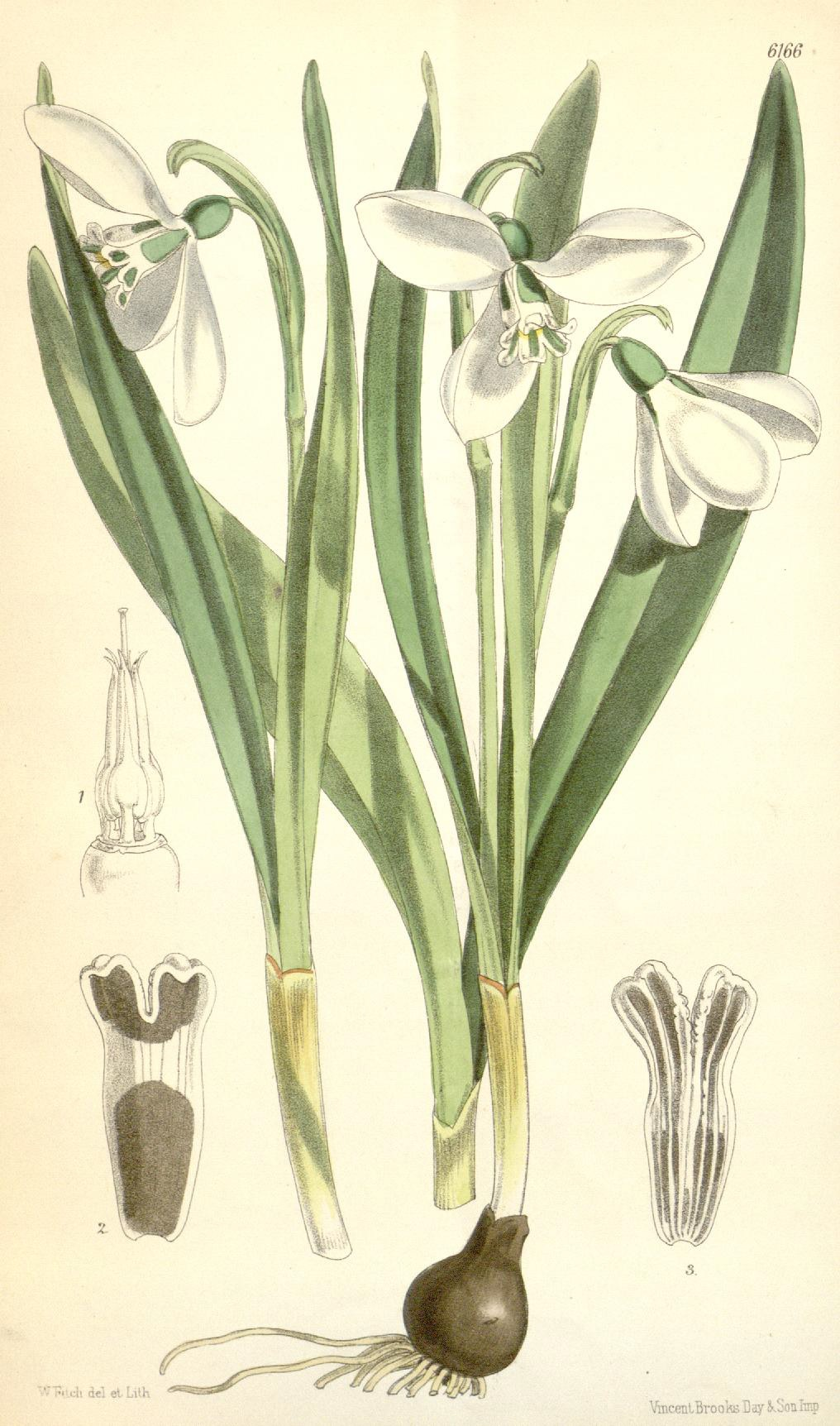
Galanthus elwesii, Joseph Dalton Hooker, Curtis's Botanical Magazine, 1875

Galanthus elwesii, Elwes's snowdrop or greater snowdrop, is a species of flowering plant in the family Amaryllidaceae, native to the Balkans and Asia Minor, where it is found in the countries of Bosnia, Bulgaria, Greece, Serbia, Moldova, Ukraine and Turkey.

This herbaceous perennial plant grows to 20–25 cm (7.9–9.8 in) high. It grows from a globose bulb, 2–3 cm in diameter. It produces two leaves which are obtuse, linear, and blue-green in colour. The flowers are globose, white, pendulous, 2–3 cm long, and solitary at the tip of a solid, pointed scape. The outer floral tepals are oblanceolate, with shorter inner tepals that are emarginate (notched at the apex), tapering towards their base with green patches apically and basally (see illustrations). The fruit forms a dehiscent capsule with three valves. Overall Galanthus elwesii is a more robust plant than G. nivalis.

== Taxonomy ==
Galanthus elwesii was identified by the British botanist Henry John Elwes on a visit to Turkey in 1874. In early April, whilst in the mountains near Smyrna (modern Izmir), he came across "the fine large snowdrop which now bears my name". It was then formally described by Joseph Dalton Hooker (1875) and named Galanthus elwesii, with an illustration by W H Fitch in Curtis's Botanical Magazine. Thus the species bears his name as the botanical authority. Later the plants collected by Elwes were found to be Galanthus gracilis, but the name was retained for a different specimen.

== Distribution ==
A native of the Balkans and Asia Minor, the species has been widely introduced elsewhere.

== Cultivation ==
Galanthus elwesii is grown as an ornamental plant in gardens where it easily naturalises. Bulbs planted in the autumn flower in the early spring. Propagation is by separation of bulbils after flowering.

In the UK, the following have received the Royal Horticultural Society's Award of Garden Merit:

- Galanthus elwesii
- Galanthus elwesii 'Comet'
- Galanthus elwesii var. monostictus

== Bibliography ==
- Davis, Aaron (1999). The genus Galanthus. A Botanical Magazine monograph. Portland, Oregon: Timber Press. ISBN 0-88192-431-8.
- Harvey, M.J. (21 May 2000). "Davis: The genus Galanthus" (Book Review). Botanical Electronic News (250).
- Dimitri, M (1987). Enciclopedia Argentina de Agricultura y Jardinería. Tomo I. Descripción de plantas cultivadas. Buenos Aires: Editorial ACME S.A.C.I. see Enciclopedia Argentina de Agricultura y Jardinería
- Harland, Gail (2016). Snowdrop. London: Reaktion Books. ISBN 978-1-78023-628-5.
- Hessayon, D.G. (1995). The bulb expert (2003 ed.). London: Sterling Publishing Company (Expert Books). ISBN 978-0-903505-42-0.
- Hooker, Joseph Dalton (1875). "Galanthus elwesii". Curtis's Botanical Magazine. 31: 6166.
- Yüzbaşıoğlu, Sırrı (2012). "Morphological variations of Galanthus elwesii in Turkey and difficulties on identification" (PDF). Bocconea. 24: 335–339. Archived from the original (PDF) on 2022-10-09.
- "The Plant List: a working list of all known plant species. Version: 1.1". Royal Botanic Gardens, Kew and Missouri Botanical Garden. September 2013.
- MBG. "Missouri Botanical Garden".
- "Tropicos". Missouri Botanical Garden.
- "World Checklist of Selected Plant Families". The Board of Trustees of the Royal Botanic Gardens, Kew.
