= Coberley =

Village in Gloucestershire, England

Coordinates: 51.84306°N 2.05643°W

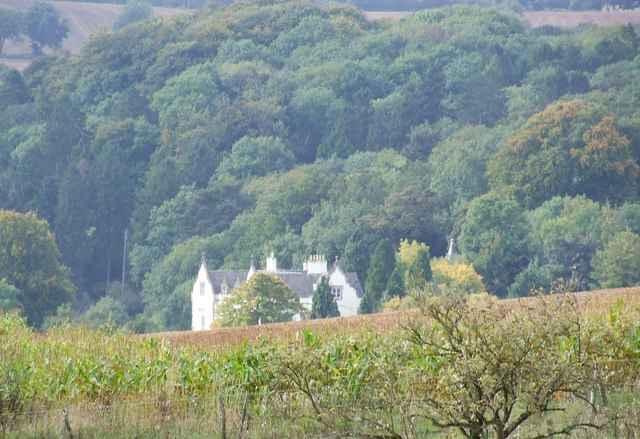
- Seven Springs

- Location within Gloucestershire
- Population: 351 (2011 census)
- OS grid reference: SO 9621 1605
- Civil parish: Coberley
- District: Cotswold
- Shire county: Gloucestershire
- Region: South West
- Country: England
- Sovereign state: United Kingdom
- Post town: Cheltenham
- Postcode district: GL53
- Dialling code: 01242
- Police: Gloucestershire
- Fire: Gloucestershire
- Ambulance: South Western
- UK Parliament: North Cotswolds

Coberley is a village and civil parish in the Cotswold District of Gloucestershire in England, 4 miles (6.4 km) south of Cheltenham. It lies at the confluence of several streams (Seven Springs) that form the River Churn, a tributary of the River Thames. The medieval village was closer to the main road, near a spring to the east of Coberley Court. The sites of the medieval and modern villages of Upper Coberley are a short distance to the east.

== History ==
The parish has two long barrows: one about 0.75 miles (1.21 km) west of the parish church and the other about 2 miles (3.2 km) west-north-west of the church. A skeleton was discovered in the latter before 1779.

The valley north of Coberley is the site of a Roman villa complex. It has been the source of numerous archaeological finds, including coins, tiles, pottery and mosaics. The site was excavated by Channel 4's Time Team in 2007 for an episode that was broadcast on 3 February 2008.

The Church of England parish church of Saint Giles had Norman features until the architect John Middleton rebuilt it in 1869–72. Middleton retained the Decorated Gothic south chapel, built in 1340 as a chantry to Saint Mary. He retained also the Perpendicular Gothic bell tower.

Henry VIII and Anne Boleyn rode to Coberley on 2 August 1535 from Gloucester. Henry went on to hunt at Miserden while Anne returned to Gloucester.

Dowmans Farm house was built in the 17th century. The present rectory was designed by Richard Pace and built in 1826. Its predecessor sheltered the future Charles II of England for the night on 10 September 1651, as he was fleeing from defeat in the Battle of Worcester, disguised as a groom.

The village school was designed by David Brandon and built in 1857. It is now Coberley Church of England Primary School.

== Sources ==
- Verey, David (1970). The Buildings of England: Gloucestershire: The Cotswolds. Harmondsworth: Penguin Books. pp. 190–192. ISBN 0-14-071040-X.
