= River Churn =

River in Gloucestershire and Wiltshire, England

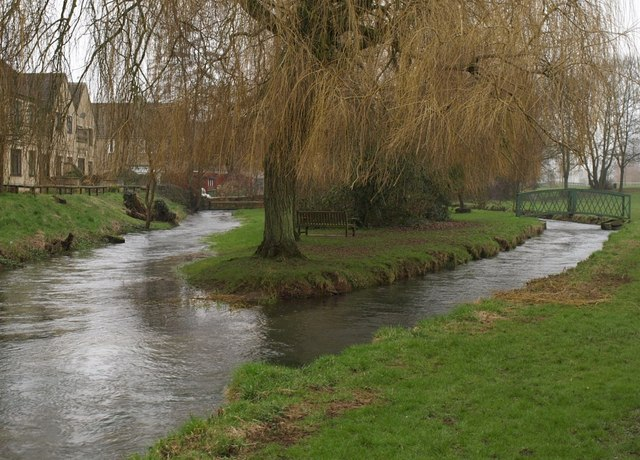
- River Churn in Cirencester

Location
- Country: England
- Counties: Gloucestershire, Wiltshire
- Towns: Cirencester, Cricklade

Physical characteristics
- Source
  - location: Seven Springs
  - coordinates: 51.8511°N 2.0504°W
  - elevation: 200 m (660 ft)
- Mouth: River Thames
  - location: Cricklade, Wiltshire
  - coordinates: 51.6450°N 1.8533°W
  - elevation: 79 m (259 ft)
- Length: 37.3 km (23.2 mi)
- Discharge
  - location: Cerney Wick, South Cerney
  - average: 0.86 m^{3}/s (30 cu ft/s)
  - minimum: 0.00 m^{3}/s (0 cu ft/s)5 November 1995
  - maximum: 4.70 m^{3}/s (166 cu ft/s)31 January 1971
- Discharge
  - location: Cirencester
  - average: 0.77 m^{3}/s (27 cu ft/s)
- Discharge
  - location: Perrott's Brook
  - average: 0.62 m^{3}/s (22 cu ft/s)

Basin features
- River system: River Thames
- Tributaries
  - left: Hilcot Brook, Gumstool Brook
  - right: Elkstone Brook, Daglingworth Stream

The River Churn is a tributary of the River Thames in central England. It rises at Seven Springs in Gloucestershire and flows south for approximately 37.3 km (23.2 mi) to meet the Thames at Cricklade in Wiltshire. Its length from its source to the confluence with the Thames is greater than that of the Thames from Thames Head, but the Churn is regarded as a tributary, rather than the main river.

== Description ==
The River Churn is the first tributary river of the River Thames. It rises in the Cotswolds at Seven Springs, south of Cheltenham, Gloucestershire, England and flows south across the Cotswold dip slope, passing through North Cerney and Cirencester, and joining the Thames in the parish of Cricklade in Wiltshire. Its length from source to confluence with the Thames is considerably greater than that of the Thames from Thames Head, and its flow is also more consistent than the winterbourne Thames, but the Churn is regarded as a tributary historically and therefore by most geography guides.

The length of the Churn is approximately 37.3 kilometres (23.2 mi). It is classed as a main river and thus falls under the jurisdiction of the Environment Agency as opposed to the local authority.

The main tributaries are the Elkstone Brook, which joins at Perrots Brook Farm, and the Daglingworth Stream, also known as the Dunt Stream or Duntisbourne, which joins at Barton Mill, Cirencester. Two smaller tributaries are the Hilcot Brook and the Gumstool Brook.

== Etymology ==
The name Churn is ancient, certainly pre-Roman and probably from a Celtic language, possibly that spoken by the Dobunni tribe, which controlled the area before the Roman conquest in the 1st century AD. The original name may have sounded similar to Korinn, but its meaning is unknown. It has also been suggested that the origin of the word is associated with the ancient British Cornovii tribe. Cognate names and name elements from the area are Cerney, Ciren and Corin as found in the settlement names of North Cerney, Cirencester, South Cerney, and Cerney Wick (all on or close to the river). Cirencester's name, first recorded as Corinium Dobunnorum, is in original identical with the name of the river.

== History ==
Much of the catchment basin of the Churn was a key Roman settlement in the 2nd to 4th centuries AD, as Corinium Dobunnorum rose to likely status of capital of a division of Britain.

The Churn and the Thames feed the waters of a western bisection of the Cotswold Water Park, converted since the 1970s from redundant gravel beds between Cirencester and Cricklade.

In 2006, the national government was engaged in a planning study to analyse methods of mitigating future flooding associated with the Churn. However, the river is known to stop flowing completely at times; in September 2011 the river bed was completely dry at Latton.

== Water quality ==
The Environment Agency measures the water quality of the river systems in England. Each is given an overall ecological status, which may be one of five levels: high, good, moderate, poor and bad. There are several components that are used to determine this, including biological status, which looks at the quantity and varieties of invertebrates, angiosperms and fish. Chemical status, which compares the concentrations of various chemicals against known safe concentrations, is rated good or fail.

Water quality of the River Churn in 2019:

Section	Ecological Status	Chemical Status	Overall Status	Length	Catchment	Channel
Churn (source to Perrots Brook)	Moderate	Fail	Moderate	16.936 km (10.524 mi)	58.642 km^{2} (22.642 sq mi)	
Churn (Baunton to Cricklade)	Moderate	Fail	Moderate	20.414 km (12.685 mi)	30.654 km^{2} (11.836 sq mi)	
Elkstone Brook	Good	Fail	Moderate	4.643 km (2.885 mi)	19.793 km^{2} (7.642 sq mi)	
Daglingworth Stream (Source to Churn)	Moderate	Fail	Moderate	11.055 km (6.869 mi)	22.369 km^{2} (8.637 sq mi)	

== See also ==
- Churn Valley
- Tributaries of the River Thames
- List of rivers of England

Next confluence upstream	River Thames	Next confluence downstream
-	River Churn	River Key (south)
