= Alexcars =

British bus operator

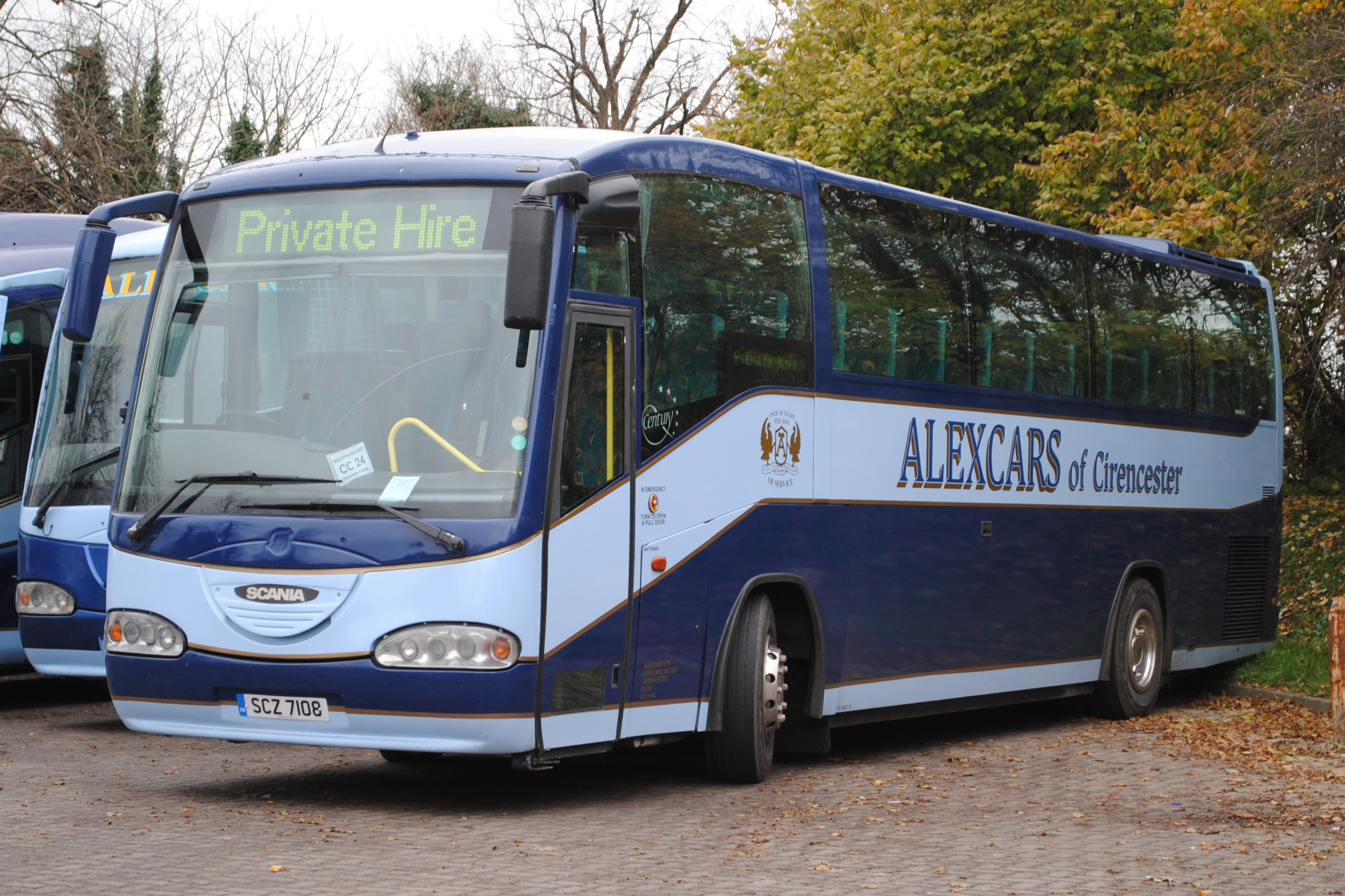
An Alexcars coach

Alexcars was a bus and coach operator based in Cirencester, UK.

== History ==
The firm was founded in 1946 by Alec and Barbara Hibberd and was originally located in Baunton. In the late 1950s, the firm moved to Cirencester where it remained until its closure.

On 14 April 2020, the company announced that it had ceased trading. The company said multiple factors, including the impact of the COVID-19 pandemic, led to the decision.

== Livery ==
The firm's vehicles had a two-tone blue livery.
