= Donald Priestley =

English cricketer (1887–1917)

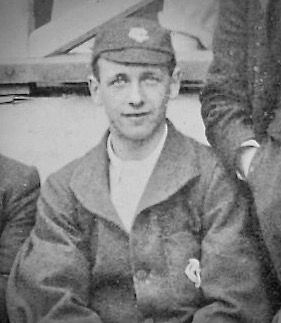
- Priestley in 1907
- Born: Donald Lacey Priestlay; 28 July 1887; Tewkesbury, Gloucestershire, England
- Died: 30 October 1917 (aged 30); Passchendaele, West Flanders, Belgium
- Occupations: Cricketer; commercial representative; wheat buyer
- Relatives: Joseph Hubert Priestley and Raymond Edward Priestley (brothers); Charles Seymour "Silas" Wright and Thomas Griffith "Grif" Taylor (brothers-in-law)
- Cricket career

Personal information
- Height: 5 ft 8.5 in (174 cm)
- Batting: Right-handed
- Bowling: Right‑arm medium

Domestic team information
- Years: Team
- 1909–10: Gloucestershire

Career statistics
Competition	First-class
Matches	7
Runs scored	154
Batting average	12.83
100s/50s	0/1
Top score	51
Catches/stumpings	2/–
- Source: Final Wicket: Test and First‑Class Cricketers Killed in the Great War
- Military service
- Allegiance: United Kingdom
- Branch: British Army
- Service years: 1916–17
- Rank: Lance corporal
- Corps: Artists Rifles (Note: The regiment was designated originally as "The Artists' Rifles" until the apostrophe was dropped in 1937.)
- Conflicts: World War I; Second Battle of Arras; Second Battle of Passchendaele †

Donald Lacey Priestley (né Priestlay; 28 July 1887 – 30 October 1917) was an English cricketer who played for Gloucestershire County Cricket Club from 1909 to 1910. He made his debut in the County Championship against Sussex at the County Ground, Hove. In May 1910, he scored fifty-one runs against Hampshire at the County Ground, Southampton. His final first class appearance for Gloucestershire was against Worcestershire at the War Memorial Ground, Stourbridge.

He was the third son of a Tewkesbury head teacher and the younger brother of Joseph Priestley, professor of botany at the University of Leeds, and Raymond Priestley, the British geologist and Antarctic explorer. He was educated at his father's school before joining his mother's family firm as a commercial representative and wheat buyer. In May 1912, he married Edith Louie Boughton in the Wesleyan chapel at Coombe Hill, Leigh.

He was a volunteer in the 5th Battalion, Gloucestershire Regiment, and during World War I, joined the Artists Rifles regiment under the Derby Scheme. He was posted to France in November 1916 and fought in the Second Battle of Arras. He was killed by shell fire during the Second Battle of Passchendaele and is commemorated on the Memorial to the Missing at the Commonwealth War Graves Commission Tyne Cot cemetery, near Passchendaele, Belgium.

== Early life and education ==
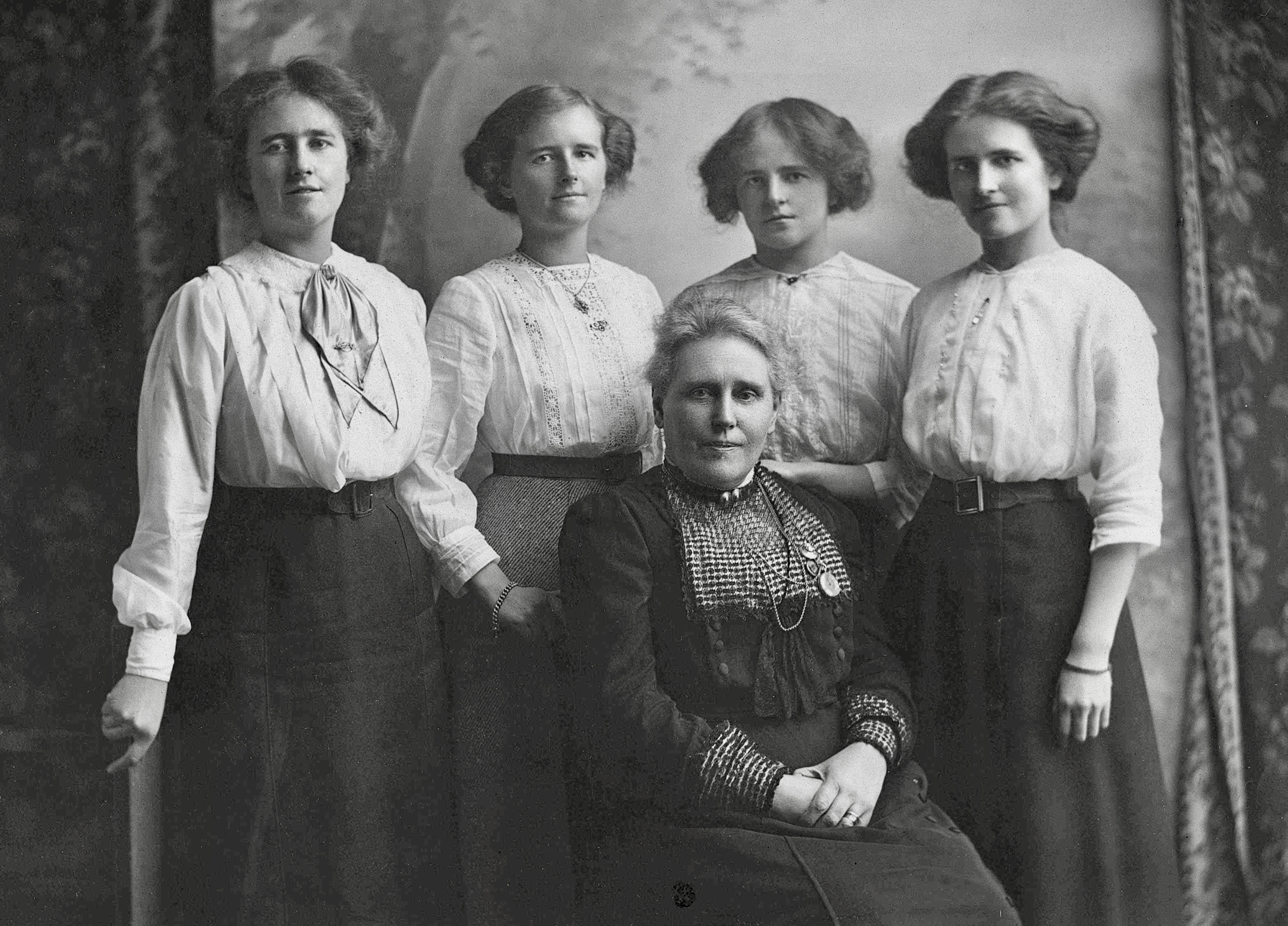
Priestley's mother and four sisters (from left to right), Edith, Doris, Joyce, and Olive, circa 1910

Priestley was born on 28 July 1887 at Tewkesbury, Gloucestershire, and baptised on 20 September 1887 at the Wesleyan Methodist chapel in Northgate Street, Tewkesbury. (Note: The chapel was demolished in 1972.) He was the third son of eight children of Joseph Edward Priestlay, then head teacher of the Abbey House school in Tewkesbury, and Henrietta, née Rice. His mother was the second surviving daughter of Richard Rice of Tewkesbury. They had met at the Methodist chapel, and had married on 22 December 1881 at Tettenhall parish church, now in the city of Wolverhampton. The Priestley family name was spelt originally as "Priestlay". However, in the early 1900s, the name changes to "Priestley" and both spellings appear on family graves in Tewkesbury Cemetery. (Note: Priestley was known as "Don" or "D.L.P." by family and friends.)

In 1875, Priestley's father graduated from the University of London with a second class Bachelor of Arts degree in animal physiology. He was appointed head teacher of Abbey House school following the death of his father, Joseph Priestley, on 13 November 1876, and remained as head until his retirement in 1917. He moved to Bristol and joined the staff of Grace, Darbyshire, and Todd, a local firm of accountants. He died on 9 December 1921, aged 67, at a nursing home in Clifton, and was interred in Canford Cemetery, Westbury-on-Trym, near Bristol. Henrietta died on 24 September 1929, aged 76, at Bishopston, Bristol.

Priestley was educated at his father's school in Tewkesbury, and along with his siblings, attended Methodist Sunday school. In 1902, he passed his preliminary Cambridge Local Examination and was awarded a school prize in mathematics. Priestley's eldest brother, Joseph, known by his family as "Bert", was professor of botany at the University of Leeds. His elder brother, Raymond, was a geologist in Robert Falcon Scott's ill-fated Terra Nova Expedition to the Antarctic from 1910 to 1913. His younger brother, Stanley, died on active service during World War I. Priestley had four sisters; Edith, Doris, Joyce, and Olive. Edith married Charles Seymour "Silas" Wright and Doris married Thomas Griffith "Grif" Taylor, both of whom were members of Scott's expedition. Joyce married Herbert William Merrell, who served with the Gloucestershire Regiment (known as the "Glosters") in World War I.

== Cricket career ==
Priestley was a good all-round sportsperson. At Tewkesbury, he captained the Second XI football team, played hockey, was a member of the Tewkesbury Popular Angling Association, and in his younger days, rowed in the annual town regatta. However, his foremost sporting interest was in playing the game of cricket. He and Stanley, who was regarded as a good bowler, played for their school's First XI and Tewkesbury cricket club. Their father was secretary of the cricket club and Priestley was said to be one of the club's best players; good at batting as well as bowling and fielding. Joseph would also go on to play for the cricket team at University College, Bristol, and captain the staff team at the University of Leeds.

[Alfred Ernest "Alf"] Dipper is not the best man they have at Tewkesbury, for D. L. Priestley would be in the front rank if he could only afford the time to play regularly.

— Cricket correspondent, Bristol Times and Mirror, 29 June 1908.

Priesley scored 1,141 runs in the 1907 season for Tewkesbury cricket club, and in May 1910, he scored 131 in one innings against Malvern, hitting eighteen fours and a six. In May 1909, he was selected to play for Gloucestershire County Cricket Club, making his debut in the County Championship against Sussex County Cricket Club at the County Ground in Hove. He came into the side to replace Charles Barnett, playing as an amateur in a team that consisted largely of professional players. He went on to play against Somerset, Sussex (at the Bristol County Ground), Nottinghamshire, Hampshire and Warwickshire.

In July 1910, Priestley made his final first class appearance against Worcestershire at the War Memorial Ground in Amblecote near Stourbridge. Writing in Athletic News, "Brum" remarked that Priestley had "undoubtedly the best innings" for Gloucestershire, (Note: A photograph of Priestley is included in the article by "Brum" in the 11 July 1910 edition of Athletic News. The photograph was taken by Thomas Gimson Foster of Brighton and Priestley is pictured dressed in a Gloucestershire cricket jacket and cap.) however, he was replaced by Douglas Robinson in Gloucestershire's next match against Northamptonshire. It has been acknowledged that Priestley did not display his best form when playing for Gloucestershire, although in June 1910, in a trial game for Gloucestershire at the Bristol County Ground, he scored ninety runs in his first innings.

Priestley's first class cricket matches for Gloucestershire County Cricket Club from 1909 to 1910
Date	Opponents	Ground	H/A	1st	2nd	Total	Catches	Result	Notes	Ref.
27 May 1909	Sussex	Hove, County Ground	A	3	3	6	1	Lost	Gloucestershire won the toss and batted first but Sussex beat them by an innings and 48 runs. Priestley was caught in both innings by Harry Butt, Sussex's wicket-keeper, off the bowling of George Cox. Priestley caught Joe Vine, Sussex's opener, for a duck.	
31 May 1909	Somerset	Taunton, County Ground	A	11	20*	31	1	Lost	Somerset batted first and beat Gloucestershire by 166 runs. Priestley caught Somerset's Vernon Hill in his first innings for one run. In Priestley's first innings, he scored two fours off Len Braund but was bowled by William Greswell, off a ball that came back from the off side.	
3 June 1909	Sussex	Bristol, County Ground	H	21	0	21	0	Drawn	The match ended in a draw after rain delayed play. Priestley's fifth wicket partnership with William Rowlands was the longest of the match for Gloucestershire. Priestley was caught by Albert Relf off the bowling of Ernest Killick. Priestley did not bat in the second innings as the rain shortened the match.	
7 June 1909	Nottinghamshire	Gloucester, Spa Ground	H	0	2	2	0	Lost	Nottinghamshire won by two wickets after heavy rain shortened the match. Priestley was bowled for a duck in his first innings by Albert Hallam.	
26 May 1910	Hampshire	Southampton, County Ground	A	13	51	64	0	Lost	Hampshire won by nine wickets. Priestley, with Richard Godsell, scored 76 runs in 40 minutes for the eighth wicket in the second innings.	
13 June 1910	Warwickshire	Gloucester, Spa Ground	H	1	9	10	0	Lost	Warwickshire won by 110 runs. Priestley was run out in his first innings and bowled by Frank Foster in his second.	
7 July 1910	Worcestershire	Stourbridge, War Memorial Ground	A	13	7	20	0	Won	Gloucestershire won by 94 runs. Priestley was bowled in his first innings by Ted Arnold.	
Year / Innings / Times not out / Most in an innings / Total runs / Batting average / Ref.; 1909 / 7 / 1 / 21 / 60 / 10.00; 1910 / 6 / 0 / 51 / 94 / 15.66; Total / 13 / 1 / 51 / 154 / 12.83									For comparison, Priestley scored 328 runs in eight matches for Tewkesbury in the 1910 season, giving a batting average of 41. He had a high score of 131 making him Tewkesbury's second highest scorer for the number of matches played.	

== Personal life ==
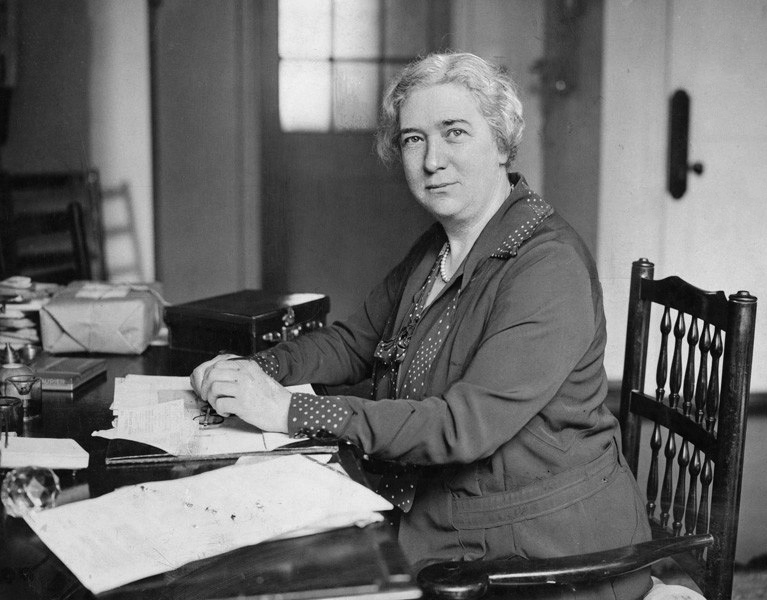
Edith's cousin, Winifred Cullis, was professor of physiology at the University of London in 1919

Priestley worked as a commercial representative and wheat buyer for his mother's family firm, William Rice and Company, corn millers and seed merchants at Abbey Mills, Tewkesbury. Stanley worked as a clerk at the company but he left Tewkesbury in 1912 to follow Joseph to the University of Leeds where he became a member of the University Officers' Training Corps. On 22 May 1912, Priestley married Edith Louie Boughton in the Wesleyan chapel at Coombe Hill, Leigh, Gloucestershire. Stanley was best man, Doris was bridesmaid, and the honeymoon was spent in Bournemouth. Edith had been a music teacher and an organist at St John the Baptist's Church, Tredington, and they had met through their shared interest in the Wesleyan Church and the Men's Own Brotherhood. After their marriage, they lived at Springfield, Barton Road, Tewkesbury.

Edith was the only daughter of Walter Thomas Boughton and Jane, née Cullis. Her mother was the daughter of Frederick Cullis, a builder in Gloucester, and the aunt of Winifred Cullis, professor of physiology at the University of London in 1919, and Cuthbert Edmund Cullis, then Hardinge professor of mathematics at the University of Calcutta. Her father was an outfitter at 84 Barton Street, Tewkesbury, and a former mayor of the town. (Note: Walter Thomas Boughton was awarded the freedom of the borough in January 1928.) During World War I, Edith played pianoforte at concerts organised to entertain wounded soldiers at the Voluntary Aid Detachment hospital at Mitton Manor, Gloucestershire. She had also volunteered at a number of YMCA huts that included Tewkesbury (her father was president of the YMCA at Tewkesbury), Park Royal camp in Harlesden, West London, and Woodcote Park near Epsom, Surrey, where there was a convalescent camp for Canadian soldiers. (Note: The YMCA hut at Woodcote Park contained a tea and writing room. This photograph by James Lewis Sangster, held at the New Westminster Museum and Archives, shows the hut during the war. For a photograph of the staff working there, see this photograph in the YMCA collection at the Cadbury Research Library.)

== War service and death ==
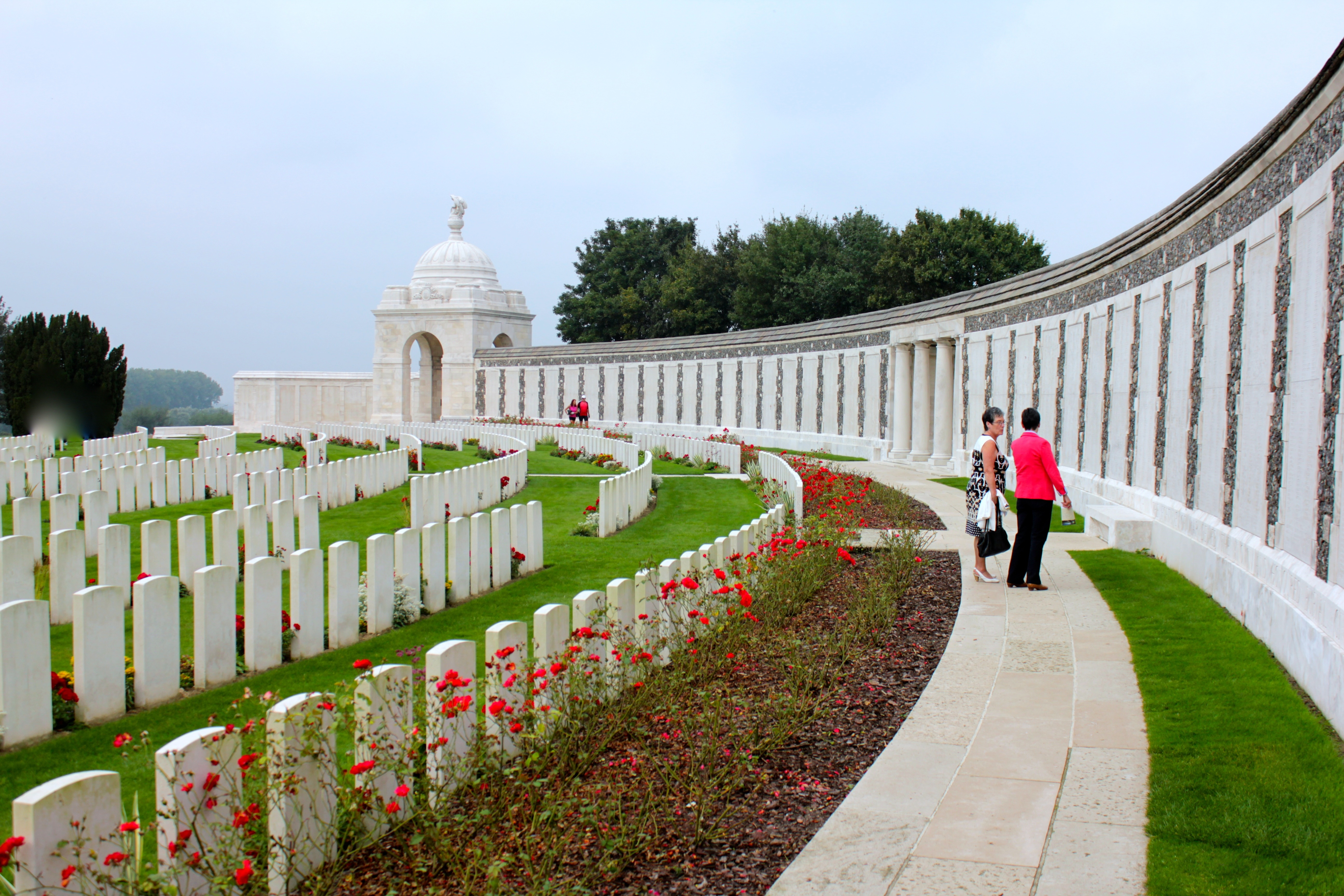
The memorial wall at Tyne Cot cemetery

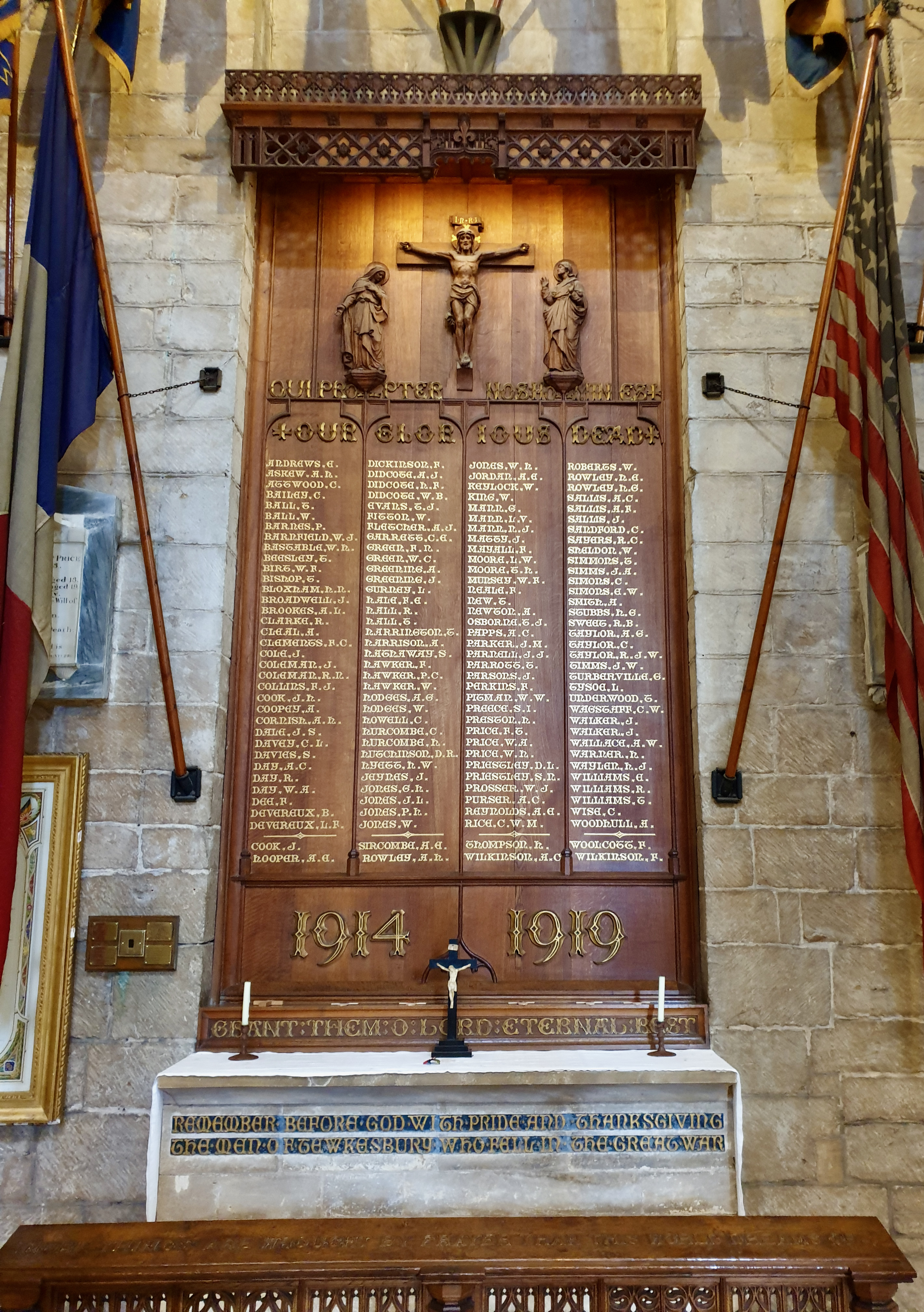
War memorial panel in Tewkesbury Abbey

Before World War I, Priestley was a volunteer in the Territorial Force D Company, 5th Battalion, Gloucestershire Regiment. On 7 December 1915, Priestley attested at Tewkesbury under the Derby Scheme (Group Scheme). Men who enrolled under the scheme were posted to the Army Reserve and then called up for military service at a later date. He was mobilised on 28 September 1916 and posted to the 1st/28th (County of London) Battalion, London Regiment, known as the Artists Rifles, based at Duke's Road, off Euston Road, London. On 4 November 1916, Priestley left Southampton for Le Havre in Normandy, France, as part of the British Expeditionary Force (BEF), and on 9 November 1916, joined his battalion at Irish Farm near Ypres, Belgium. In June 1917, the battalion joined the 63rd (Royal Naval) Division on the Western Front, and took part in the Second Battle of Arras.

At the beginning of October 1917, Priestley was appointed an unpaid lance corporal, the lowest non-commissioned officer rank. He was killed by shell fire on 30 October 1917, during the Second Battle of Passchendaele, along with a large section of his platoon, while leading them through waist-deep mud towards a German position in the Ypres Salient. Edith was working at Woodcote Park when her father received the letter from Priestley's platoon officer stating that he had been killed in action. His body was never recovered but he is commemorated on panel 153 of the Memorial to the Missing at the Commonwealth War Graves Commission Tyne Cot cemetery, near Passchendaele, Belgium. His cousin, Charles Lacey Priestley, a captain in the Gloucestershire Regiment, was killed in the same battle on 11 November 1917. Charles was the son of Charles William Priestley, head teacher of Richmond Lodge, a preparatory school for boys in Torquay, Devon.

There are memorials to Priestley in Tewkesbury at the abbey, the cross, the town hall, and the Methodist church. The memorial inside the town hall was displayed originally at his school. There is also a memorial bench in the abbey grounds that was restored in 2015 by the Old Theocsbrian Society, the alumni association for the Abbey House school. In March 1942, Raymond, then vice‑chancellor of the University of Birmingham, gifted money to Tewkesbury Grammar School to found two cricket prizes in memory of his brothers. The "Donald Lacey Priestley Prize" was given to the pupil with the best batting record and the "Stanley Noel Priestley Prize" was given for the best bowling average performance. Gloucestershire County Cricket Club Heritage Trust have had commissioned a memorial tablet to commemorate all eighteen first-class Gloucestershire cricket players who were killed during the war. The tablet is located inside the museum and educational centre at the Bristol County Ground.

After Priestley's death, Edith stayed at Richmond Lodge before moving to Hoo Farm at Deerhurst, Tewkesbury, owned at the time by her father. She was granted a war widows' pension on 29 April 1918, and in the following year, she moved to 25 Gower Street, London, close to the Royal Academy of Dramatic Art (RADA) building and the Medical School at University College London. (Note: In 1926, Club Chambers Limited purchased the lease to 25 Gower Street. A room would cost one pound and ten shillings per week with breakfast costing one shilling. Residential chambers were a popular choice of accommodation for women in the 1920s as they were often situated in desirable districts at a moderate cost.) Edith's mother came to live with her after the death of Edith's father in 1933, and in June 1939, they left London for Gloucestershire, to stay with her brother, Herbert Cullis Boughton, at his home in Apperley near Tewkesbury. After the end of World War II, she returned to London and died on 30 December 1975, aged 95, at St Mary's Hospital in Harrow Road, Paddington. She was cremated on 5 January 1976 at Kensal Green Cemetery and her ashes were later interred in the cemetery grounds.

== See also ==
- Cuthbert Edmund Cullis
- Winifred Cullis
- Gilbert Jessop
- Joseph Hubert Priestley
- Raymond Priestley
- Cyril Sewell
