= Physiology =

Science regarding functions in organisms or living systems

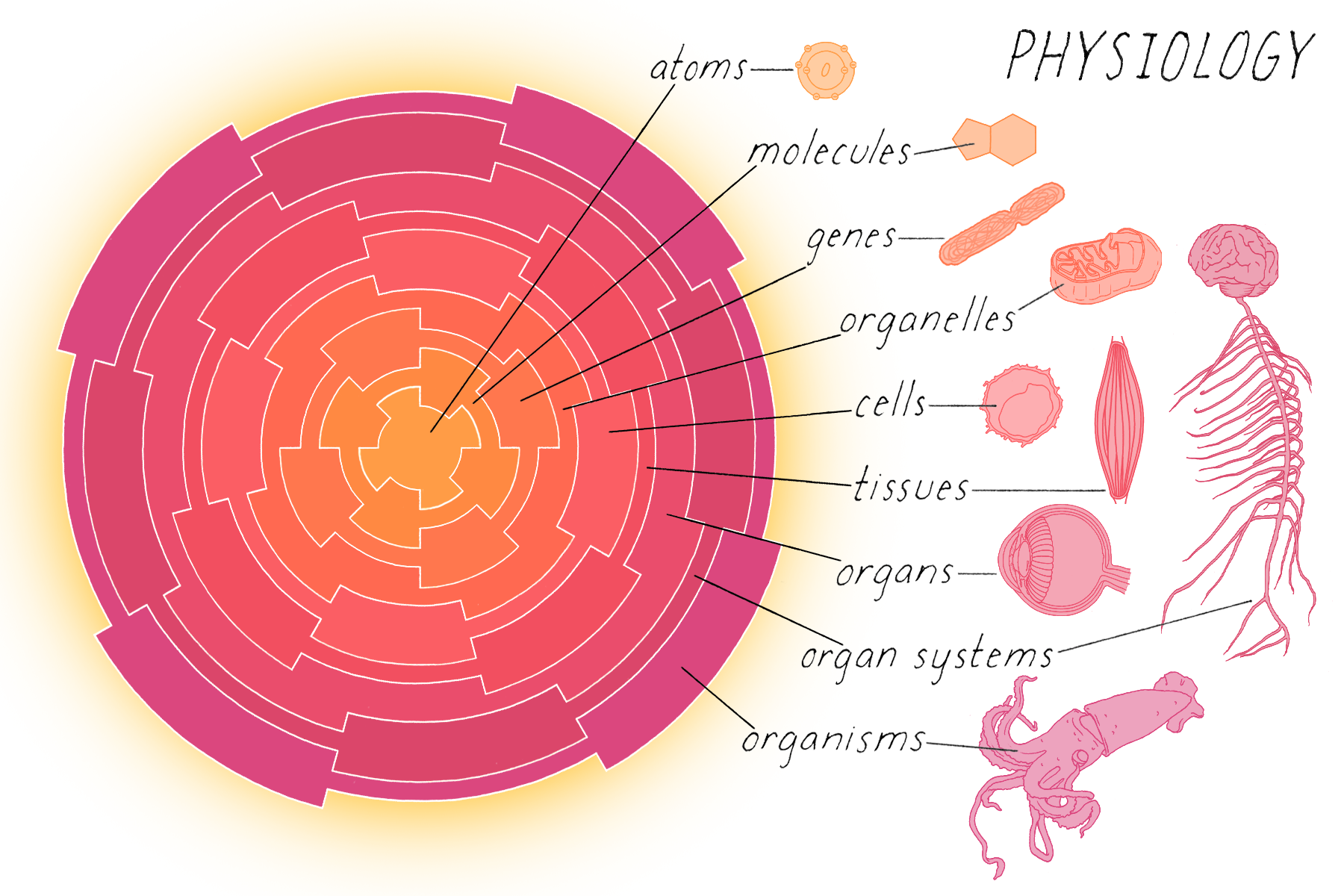
The study of functioning of living organisms and that of their tissues and cells.

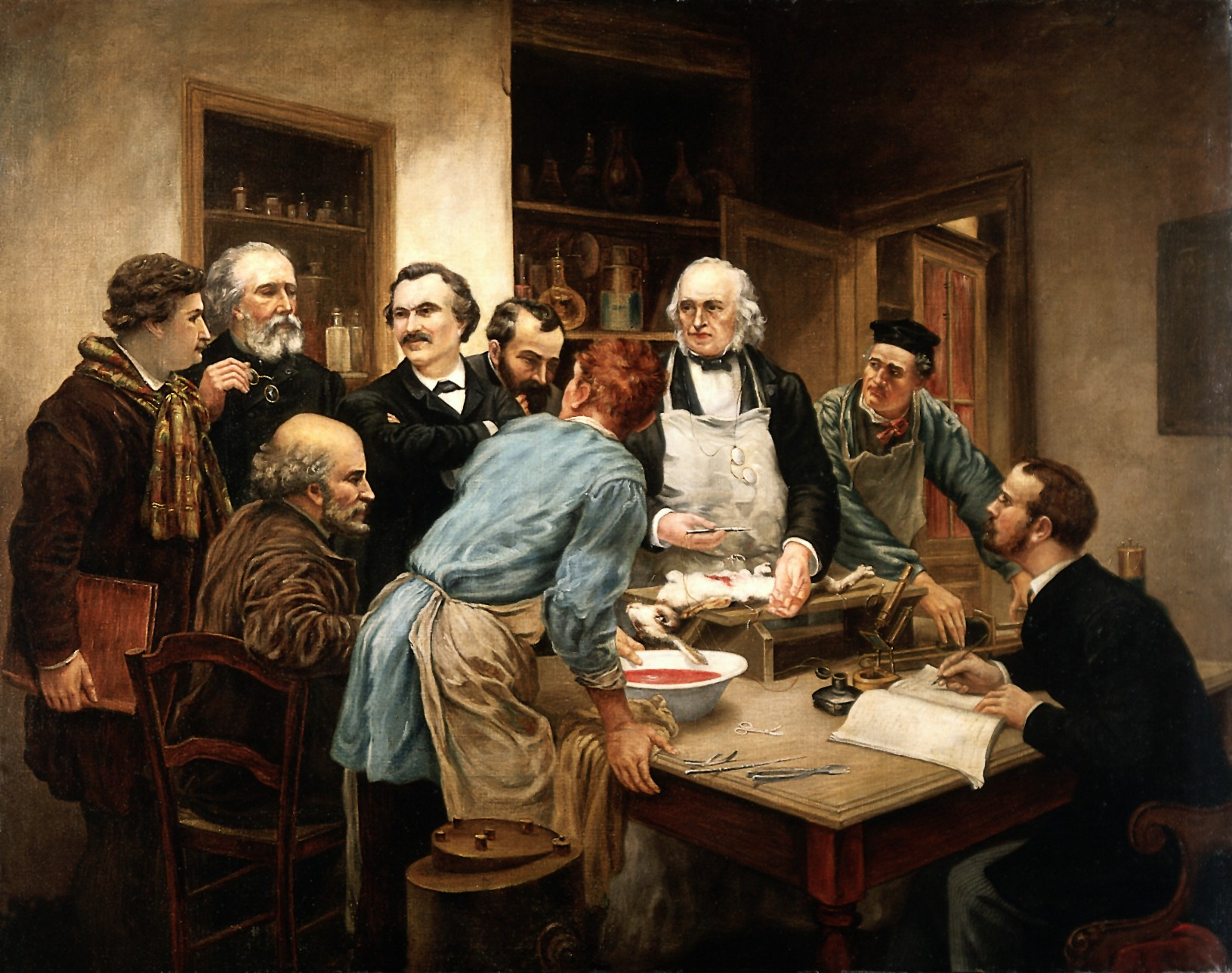
Oil painting depicting Claude Bernard, the father of modern physiology, with his pupils

Physiology (/ˌfɪziˈɒlədʒi/; from Ancient Greek φύσις (phúsis) 'nature, origin' and -λογία (-logía) 'study of') is the scientific study of functions and mechanisms in a living system. As a subdiscipline of biology, physiology focuses on how organisms, organ systems, individual organs, cells, and biomolecules carry out chemical and physical functions in a living system. According to the classes of organisms, the field can be divided into medical physiology, animal physiology, plant physiology, cell physiology, and comparative physiology.

Central to physiological functioning are biophysical and biochemical processes, homeostatic control mechanisms, and communication between cells. Physiological state is the condition of normal function. In contrast, pathological state refers to abnormal conditions, including human diseases.

The Nobel Prize in Physiology or Medicine is awarded by the Royal Swedish Academy of Sciences for exceptional scientific achievements in physiology related to the field of medicine.

== Foundations ==
Because physiology focuses on the functions and mechanisms of living organisms at all levels, from the molecular and cellular level to the level of whole organisms and populations, its foundations span a range of key disciplines:

- Anatomy is the study of the structure and organization of living organisms, from the microscopic level of cells and tissues to the macroscopic level of organs and systems. Anatomical knowledge is important in physiology because the structure and function of an organism are often dictated by one another.
- Biochemistry is the study of the chemical processes and substances that occur within living organisms. Knowledge of biochemistry provides the foundation for understanding cellular and molecular processes that are essential to the functioning of organisms.
- Biophysics is the study of the physical properties of living organisms and their interactions with their environment. It helps to explain how organisms sense and respond to different stimuli, such as light, sound, and temperature, and how they maintain homeostasis, or a stable internal environment.
- Genetics is the study of heredity and the variation of traits within and between populations. It provides insights into the genetic basis of physiological processes and the ways in which genes interact with the environment to influence an organism's phenotype.
- Evolutionary biology is the study of the processes that have led to the diversity of life on Earth. It helps to explain the origin and adaptive significance of physiological processes and the ways in which organisms have evolved to cope with their environment.

== Subdisciplines ==
There are many ways to categorize the subdisciplines of physiology:

- based on the taxa studied: human physiology, animal physiology, plant physiology, microbial physiology, viral physiology
- based on the level of organization: cell physiology, molecular physiology, systems physiology, organismal physiology, ecological physiology, integrative physiology
- based on the process that causes physiological variation: developmental physiology, environmental physiology, evolutionary physiology
- based on the ultimate goals of the research: applied physiology (e.g., medical physiology), non-applied (e.g., comparative physiology)

=== Subdisciplines by level of organisation ===
==== Cell physiology ====
Although there are differences between animal, plant, and microbial cells, the basic physiological functions of cells can be divided into the processes of cell division, cell signaling, cell growth, and cell metabolism.

=== Subdisciplines by taxa ===
==== Plant physiology ====
Plant physiology is a subdiscipline of botany concerned with the functioning of plants. Closely related fields include plant morphology, plant ecology, phytochemistry, cell biology, genetics, biophysics, and molecular biology. Fundamental processes of plant physiology include photosynthesis, respiration, plant nutrition, tropisms, nastic movements, photoperiodism, photomorphogenesis, circadian rhythms, seed germination, dormancy, and stomata function and transpiration. Absorption of water by roots, production of food in the leaves, and growth of shoots towards light are examples of plant physiology.

==== Human physiology ====
Human physiology is the study of how the human body's systems and functions work together to maintain a stable internal environment. It includes the study of the nervous, endocrine, cardiovascular, respiratory, digestive, and urinary systems, as well as cellular and exercise physiology. Understanding human physiology is essential for diagnosing and treating health conditions and promoting overall wellbeing.

It seeks to understand the mechanisms that work to keep the human body alive and functioning, through scientific enquiry into the nature of mechanical, physical, and biochemical functions of humans, their organs, and the cells of which they are composed. The principal level of focus of physiology is at the level of organs and systems within systems. The endocrine and nervous systems play major roles in the reception and transmission of signals that integrate function in animals. Homeostasis is a major aspect with regard to such interactions within plants as well as animals. The biological basis of the study of physiology, integration refers to the overlap of many functions of the systems of the human body, as well as its accompanied form. It is achieved through communication that occurs in a variety of ways, both electrical and chemical.

Changes in physiology can impact the mental functions of individuals. Examples of this would be the effects of certain medications or toxic levels of substances. Change in behavior as a result of these substances is often used to assess the health of individuals.

Much of the foundation of knowledge in human physiology was provided by animal experimentation. Due to the frequent connection between form and function, physiology and anatomy are intrinsically linked and are studied in tandem as part of a medical curriculum.

=== Subdisciplines by research objective ===
==== Comparative physiology ====
Involving evolutionary physiology and environmental physiology, comparative physiology considers the diversity of functional characteristics across organisms.

== History ==
=== The classical era ===
The study of human physiology as a medical field originates in classical Greece, at the time of Hippocrates (late 5th century BC). Outside of Western tradition, early forms of physiology or anatomy can be reconstructed as having been present at around the same time in China, India and elsewhere. Hippocrates incorporated the theory of humorism, which consisted of four basic substances: earth, water, air and fire. Each substance is known for having a corresponding humor: black bile, phlegm, blood, and yellow bile, respectively. Hippocrates also noted some emotional connections to the four humors, on which Galen would later expand. The critical thinking of Aristotle and his emphasis on the relationship between structure and function marked the beginning of physiology in Ancient Greece. Like Hippocrates, Aristotle took to the humoral theory of disease, which also consisted of four primary qualities in life: hot, cold, wet and dry. Galen (c. 130–200 AD) was the first to use experiments to probe the functions of the body. Unlike Hippocrates, Galen argued that humoral imbalances can be located in specific organs, including the entire body. Galen also played off of Hippocrates' idea that emotions were also tied to the humors, and added the notion of temperaments: sanguine corresponds with blood; phlegmatic is tied to phlegm; yellow bile is connected to choleric; and black bile corresponds with melancholy. Galen also saw the human body consisting of three connected systems: the brain and nerves, which are responsible for thoughts and sensations; the heart and arteries, which give life; and the liver and veins, which can be attributed to nutrition and growth. Galen was also the founder of experimental physiology. And for the next 1,400 years, Galenic physiology was a powerful and influential tool in medicine.

=== Early modern period ===
Jean Fernel (1497–1558), a French physician, introduced the term "physiology". Galen, Ibn al-Nafis, Michael Servetus, Realdo Colombo, Amato Lusitano and William Harvey, are credited as making important discoveries about the circulatory system. Santorio Santorio in 1610s was the first to use a device to measure the pulse rate (the pulsilogium), and a thermoscope to measure temperature.

In 1791 Luigi Galvani described the role of electricity in the nerves of dissected frogs. In 1811, César Julien Jean Legallois studied respiration in animal dissection and lesions and found the center of respiration in the medulla oblongata. In the same year, Charles Bell finished work on what would later become known as the Bell–Magendie law, which compared functional differences between dorsal and ventral roots of the spinal cord. In 1824, François Magendie described the sensory roots and produced the first evidence of the cerebellum's role in equilibration to complete the Bell–Magendie law.

In the 1820s, the French physiologist Henri Milne-Edwards introduced the notion of physiological division of labor, which allowed to "compare and study living things as if they were machines created by the industry of man." Inspired in the work of Adam Smith, Milne-Edwards wrote that the "body of all living beings, whether animal or plant, resembles a factory ... where the organs, comparable to workers, work incessantly to produce the phenomena that constitute the life of the individual." In more differentiated organisms, the functional labor could be apportioned between different instruments or systems (called by him as appareils).

In 1858, Joseph Lister studied the cause of blood coagulation and inflammation that resulted after previous injuries and surgical wounds. He later discovered and implemented antiseptics in the operating room, and as a result, decreased the death rate from surgery by a substantial amount.

The Physiological Society was founded in London in 1876 as a dining club. The American Physiological Society (APS) is a nonprofit organization that was founded in 1887. The Society is, "devoted to fostering education, scientific research, and dissemination of information in the physiological sciences."

In 1891, Ivan Pavlov performed research on "conditional responses" that involved dogs' saliva production in response to a bell and visual stimuli.

In the 19th century, physiological knowledge began to accumulate at a rapid rate, in particular with the 1838 appearance of the cell theory of Matthias Schleiden and Theodor Schwann. It radically stated that organisms are made up of units called cells. Claude Bernard's (1813–1878) further discoveries ultimately led to his concept of milieu interieur (internal environment), which would later be taken up and championed as "homeostasis" by American physiologist Walter B. Cannon in 1929. By homeostasis, Cannon meant "the maintenance of steady states in the body and the physiological processes through which they are regulated." In other words, the body's ability to regulate its internal environment. William Beaumont was the first American to utilize the practical application of physiology.

Nineteenth-century physiologists such as Michael Foster, Max Verworn, and Alfred Binet, based on Haeckel's ideas, elaborated what came to be called "general physiology", a unified science of life based on the cell actions, later renamed in the 20th century as cell biology.

=== Late modern period ===
In the 20th century, biologists became interested in how organisms other than human beings function, eventually spawning the fields of comparative physiology and ecophysiology. Major figures in these fields include Knut Schmidt-Nielsen and George Bartholomew. Most recently, evolutionary physiology has become a distinct subdiscipline.

In 1920, August Krogh won the Nobel Prize for discovering how, in capillaries, blood flow is regulated.

In 1954, Andrew Huxley and Hugh Huxley, alongside their research team, discovered the sliding filaments in skeletal muscle, known today as the sliding filament theory.

Recently, there have been intense debates about the vitality of physiology as a discipline (Is it dead or alive?). If physiology is perhaps less visible nowadays than during the golden age of the 19th century, it is in large part because the field has given birth to some of the most active domains of today's biological sciences, such as neuroscience, endocrinology, and immunology. Furthermore, physiology is still often seen as an integrative discipline, which can put together into a coherent framework data coming from various different domains.

== Notable physiologists ==
=== Women in physiology ===
Initially, women were largely excluded from official involvement in any physiological society. The American Physiological Society, for example, was founded in 1887 and included only men in its ranks. In 1902, the American Physiological Society elected Ida Hyde as the first female member of the society. Hyde, a representative of the American Association of University Women, a global non-profit organization that advances equity for women and girls in education, attempted to promote gender equality in every aspect of science and medicine.

Soon thereafter, in 1913, J.S. Haldane proposed that women be allowed to formally join The Physiological Society, which had been founded in 1876. On 3 July 1915, six women were officially admitted: Florence Buchanan, Winifred Cullis, Ruth Skelton, Sarah C. M. Sowton, Constance Leetham Terry, and Enid M. Tribe. The centenary of the election of women was celebrated in 2015 with the publication of the book "Women Physiologists: Centenary Celebrations And Beyond For The Physiological Society." (ISBN 978-0-9933410-0-7)

Prominent women physiologists include:

- Bodil Schmidt-Nielsen, the first woman president of the American Physiological Society in 1975.
- Gerty Cori, along with her husband Carl Cori, received the Nobel Prize in Physiology or Medicine in 1947 for their discovery of the phosphate-containing form of glucose known as glycogen, as well as its function within eukaryotic metabolic mechanisms for energy production. Moreover, they discovered the Cori cycle, also known as the Lactic acid cycle, which describes how muscle tissue converts glycogen into lactic acid via lactic acid fermentation.
- Barbara McClintock was rewarded the 1983 Nobel Prize in Physiology or Medicine for the discovery of genetic transposition. McClintock is the only female recipient who has won an unshared Nobel Prize.
- Gertrude Elion, along with George Hitchings and Sir James Black, received the Nobel Prize for Physiology or Medicine in 1988 for their development of drugs employed in the treatment of several major diseases, such as leukemia, some autoimmune disorders, gout, malaria, and viral herpes.
- Linda B. Buck, along with Richard Axel, received the Nobel Prize in Physiology or Medicine in 2004 for their discovery of odorant receptors and the complex organization of the olfactory system.
- Françoise Barré-Sinoussi, along with Luc Montagnier, received the Nobel Prize in Physiology or Medicine in 2008 for their work on the identification of the Human Immunodeficiency Virus (HIV), the cause of Acquired Immunodeficiency Syndrome (AIDS).
- Elizabeth Blackburn, along with Carol W. Greider and Jack W. Szostak, was awarded the 2009 Nobel Prize for Physiology or Medicine for the discovery of the genetic composition and function of telomeres and the enzyme called telomerase.

== See also ==
- Outline of physiology
- Biochemistry
- Biophysics
- Cytoarchitecture
- Defense physiology
- Ecophysiology
- Exercise physiology
- Fish physiology
- Insect physiology
- Human body
- Molecular biology
- Metabolome
- Neurophysiology
- Pathophysiology
- Pharmacology
- Physiome
- American Physiological Society
- International Union of Physiological Sciences
- The Physiological Society
- Brazilian Society of Physiology

== Bibliography ==
Human physiology

- Hall, John (2011). Guyton and Hall textbook of medical physiology (12th ed.). Philadelphia, PA: Saunders/Elsevier. ISBN 978-1-4160-4574-8.
- Widmaier, E.P., Raff, H., Strang, K.T. Vander's Human Physiology. 11th Edition, McGraw-Hill, 2009.
- Marieb, E.N. Essentials of Human Anatomy and Physiology. 10th Edition, Benjamin Cummings, 2012.

Animal physiology

- Hill, R.W., Wyse, G.A., Anderson, M. Animal Physiology, 3rd ed. Sinauer Associates, Sunderland, 2012.
- Moyes, C.D., Schulte, P.M. Principles of Animal Physiology, second edition. Pearson/Benjamin Cummings. Boston, MA, 2008.
- Randall, D., Burggren, W., and French, K. Eckert Animal Physiology: Mechanism and Adaptation, 5th Edition. W.H. Freeman and Company, 2002.
- Schmidt-Nielsen, K. Animal Physiology: Adaptation and Environment. Cambridge & New York: Cambridge University Press, 1997.
- Withers, P.C. Comparative animal physiology. Saunders College Publishing, New York, 1992.

Plant physiology

- Larcher, W. Physiological plant ecology (4th ed.). Springer, 2001.
- Salisbury, F.B, Ross, C.W. Plant physiology. Brooks/Cole Pub Co., 1992.
- Taiz, L., Zieger, E. Plant Physiology (5th ed.), Sunderland, Massachusetts: Sinauer, 2010.

Fungal physiology

- Griffin, D.H. Fungal Physiology, Second Edition. Wiley-Liss, New York, 1994.

Protistan physiology

- Levandowsky, M. Physiological Adaptations of Protists. In: Cell physiology sourcebook: essentials of membrane biophysics. Amsterdam; Boston: Elsevier/AP, 2012.
- Levandowski, M., Hutner, S.H. (eds). Biochemistry and physiology of protozoa. Volumes 1, 2, and 3. Academic Press: New York, NY, 1979; 2nd ed.
- Laybourn-Parry J. A Functional Biology of Free-Living Protozoa. Berkeley, California: University of California Press; 1984.

Algal physiology

- Lobban, C.S., Harrison, P.J. Seaweed ecology and physiology. Cambridge University Press, 1997.
- Stewart, W. D. P. (ed.). Algal Physiology and Biochemistry. Blackwell Scientific Publications, Oxford, 1974.

Bacterial physiology

- El-Sharoud, W. (ed.). Bacterial Physiology: A Molecular Approach. Springer-Verlag, Berlin-Heidelberg, 2008.
- Kim, B.H., Gadd, M.G. Bacterial Physiology and Metabolism. Cambridge, 2008.
- Moat, A.G., Foster, J.W., Spector, M.P. Microbial Physiology, 4th ed. Wiley-Liss, Inc. New York, NY, 2002.
