= Cullis =

Cullis is a surname. Notable people with the surname include:

- Anthony Cullis (1946–2021), a British electronic engineer
- Cuthbert Edmund Cullis (1868–1954), an English mathematician
- Eleanor Cullis-Hill (1913–2001), an Australian architect
- Kevin Cullis (born 1958), an English football manager
- Severn Cullis-Suzuki (born 1979), a Canadian environmental activist, speaker, television host, and author
- Stan Cullis (1916–2001), an English football player and manager
- Winifred Cullis (1875–1956), a British physician and academic
