= Sarah C. M. Sowton =

British physiologist (1854 – 1929)

Sarah C. M. Sowton (who published as [Miss] S.C.M. Sowton, 1854 – 1929) was a British physiologist. She had a varied scientific career beginning in the 1890s in which she investigated the impact of various factors on bodily function, from chemical stimulation to work and the menstrual cycle, culminating in a post as researcher to Britain's Industrial Fatigue Research Board in the 1920s. She was a pioneer of women's involvement in the Physiological Society.

== Scientific career ==
In the 1890s, she collaborated with Augustus Waller at St Mary's Hospital Medical School, London on the electrical effects produced in the heart by chemical stimulation. Waller praised the 'undivided attention and great neatness' of her work, and noted that 'Many of the most successful records have been obtained for me in my absence.'

In 1898, she gave a paper at the fourth International Physiological Congress, one of seven women delegates there.

In 1897 and 1899, she studied at Carl Ludwig's institute of physiology at Leipzig. At the suggestion of Ewald Hering, she studied the non-medullated nerve, culminating in a solo publication which was communicated to the Royal Society by Waller on her behalf.

In the 1900s, Sowton carried out research at the University of Liverpool. She collaborated with the head of department, Charles Sherrington, on several papers. She assisted his research for the Special Chloroform Committee, and together they established that the flexor reflex could be replaced by an ipsilateral extensor reflex in the presence of weak stimuli. She also co-published papers with her colleagues in Sherrington's department, including W.G. Smith on the psychology of visual perception. She continued working with Sherrington into the 1910s when he moved to Oxford, but she also appeared in Leeds working with Albert and Helen Leyton on anaphylaxis.

In the 1920s she held the post of Medical and Psychological Researcher at the Industrial Fatigue Research Board which had been set up to investigate the impact of fatigue on the body at the end of the First World War. With Australian psychologist Bernard Muscio, she developed practical fatigue tests; and with industrial psychologist Charles Myers, she established that there was wide variation in how women’s muscular and mental reactions were impacted by menstruation.

== Physiological Society ==
Several of Sowton's papers and notes appeared in the Journal of Physiology between 1896 and 1903, before women were admitted to the Physiological Society as members or guests. She attended the first meeting of the Physiological Society which admitted women, in 1906, and in 1915 she was one of the first six women to be admitted to the society when this was permitted. These were Florence Buchanan, Winifred Cullis, Ruth Skelton, Sowton, Constance Leetham Terry and Enid Tribe.

== Select solo publications ==
- 'Electromotive phenomena of the non-medullated nerve,' Proceedings of the Royal Society of London 66 (1900)
- 'Some experience in the testing of the tincture of digitalis,' British Medical Journal 1 (1908)
- 'Two Contributions to the Experimental Study of the Menstrual Cycle,' Industrial Fatigue Research Board 45 (1928)
