= Anatomy and physiology =

Fields of biology and medicine

Anatomy and physiology (A&P) are closely related fields of biology that underpin most of medicine. Anatomy is the study of the physical parts of and structures within an organism (generally the human body), whereas physiology is the study of their functions and processes.

These two subjects are often taught in combination. Such a course usually focuses primarily on organ systems, organs, and their interactions, but often also discusses other levels of organization, such as tissues, cells, and biochemistry.

== See also ==
- Outline of biology
- Outline of human anatomy
- Outline of physiology
