= Ruth Skelton =

British physiologist (d. 1980)

Ruth Filby Skelton (d. 1980) was a British biologist who was one of the first women elected to the Physiological Society in 1915.

== Life ==
Skelton earned a BsC from University College London. She was active in the Chelsea Physical Training College Old Students' Association in the 1900s and 1910s.

In 1915, when the Physiological Society had voted to admit women, Skelton was proposed for membership by Joseph Barcroft along with Florence Buchanan, Winifred Cullis, Enid Tribe, Constance Leetham, and S.C.M. Sowton. Skelton’s first paper with the Journal of Physiology came in 1921.

By that time, she had made several publications about her work at the Lister Institute of Preventative Medicine. She studied urine production and the prevention of scurvy there. One of her notable contributions was a collaboration with Harriette Chick in which they used guinea pigs to determine the antiscorbutic properties of foods.
