= Tredington =

Tredington may refer to:

- Tredington, Gloucestershire
- Tredington, Warwickshire, formerly in Worcestershire
