= Constance Leetham =

British physiologist (1888–1983)

Constance Leetham (1888–1983) was a British physiologist who was one of the first women to be admitted to the Physiological Society.

== Life ==
She was the second of three daughters of miller Henry Ernest Leetham of Dringhouses. After gaining a BSc, she worked as a demonstrator in physiology at the London School of Medicine for Women. She was granted the University of London’s Studentship in Physiology in 1913 and worked in the Physiological Laboratory with John Addyman Gardner on the respiration of fish.

In 1915, she was proposed by Joseph Barcroft as a member of the Physiological Society, six months after the rules had been amended to allow women. She was one of the first six women to be admitted as members alongside Florence Buchanan, Winifred Cullis, Ruth Skelton, S. C. M. Sowton, and Enid Tribe.

The same year, she married the writer J. E. Harold Terry. Her sister Kathleen had married Harold’s brother Noel Terry. Harold and Constance had two daughters and two sons.
