= Enid Tribe Oppenheimer =

British physiologist (1885 – 1966)

Enid Tribe Oppenheimer (1885 – 1966) was a British physiologist. After becoming one of the first six women admitted as members of the Physiological Society, she studied cardiology and the carcinogenic properties of plastics at Columbia University.

== Early life ==
Born Enid Muriel Simmons in 1885 to London architect William Simmons and his wife Louisa, née Johnstone, she won a scholarship to Bedford College, London in 1904, and gained a Class I pass in her BSc. Her first husband was Joseph Tribe.

== Scientific career in Britain ==
Tribe spent ten years on the faculty of the London School of Medicine for Women, where she was lecturer in histology and published on neuroscience.

In 1915, she became one of the six first women to be admitted as members of the Physiological Society along with Florence Buchanan, Winifred Cullis, Constance Leetham, Ruth Skelton, and S.C.M Sowton.

== Columbia University ==
After the death of her first husband, Tribe married American physiologist Bernard Sutro Oppenheimer in 1919 and returned to Columbia University with him. She became instructor in physiology there from 1932 to 1956.

At Columbia, she published on cardiology with Myron Prinzmetal and Alvan Barach and instituted formal stress testing with Arthur Master, but her most influential work was carried out with her husband and Arthur Purdy Stout. While studying hypertension drugs, the team accidentally discovered a connection between plastics and tumours, and they turned to pursue further research on the carcinogenic properties of plastics at the Institute for Cancer Research at Columbia. Their work was reviewed by the Plastics Committee of the Manufacturing Chemists' Association; however, their concerns about the plastics were not fully implemented (the plastics were deemed 'non-toxic' and their carcinogenic nature was not addressed).

In 1961, she was discovered to be the oldest living woman member of the American Physiological Society (having been elected a member in 1932) and was unofficially elected 'Mother' of the Society, receiving a bouquet of flowers on Mothers Day.

== Solo publications ==
- Enid M. Tribe, 'Vaso-motor nerves in the lungs,' Journal of Physiology 48:2-3 (1914), 154-170
- Enid T. Oppenheimer, 'Studies on the so-called heart hormone,' American Journal of Physiology 90:3 (1929), 656-667
