= Elmstone Hardwicke =

Village in Gloucestershire, England

Coordinates: 51.932902°N 2.117036°W

- Location within Gloucestershire
- Population: 296 (2011)
- District: Tewkesbury
- Shire county: Gloucestershire
- Region: South West
- Country: England
- Sovereign state: United Kingdom
- Post town: CHELTENHAM
- Postcode district: GL51
- Dialling code: 01452
- Police: Gloucestershire
- Fire: Gloucestershire
- Ambulance: South Western
- UK Parliament: Tewkesbury

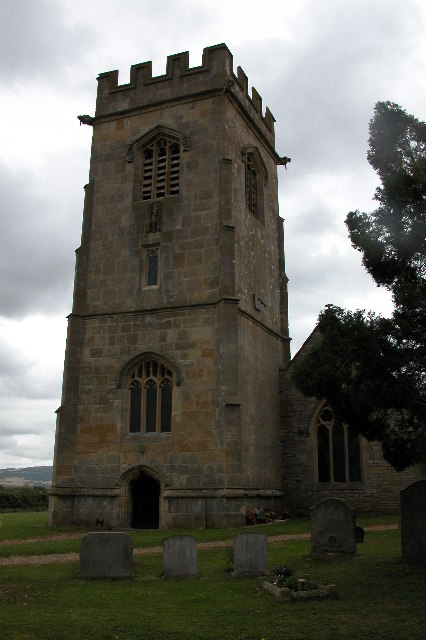
St Mary Magdelene Church, Elmstone Hardwicke

Elmstone Hardwicke is a village and sizeable parish north-west of Cheltenham in Gloucestershire, England.

St Mary Magdelene Church may be considered the hub of the village; its location is grid reference so920260. The church has a 9th-century carved stone head which is ornamented like the font at Deerhurst.

Elmstone Hardwicke is in the borough of Tewkesbury, the Cheltenham post town, and on the Coombe Hill, Cheltenham, telephone exchange. Nearby villages include Uckington, Stoke Orchard, and Tredington.

Elmstone Hardwicke shares a village hall with Uckington.

== History ==
The National Gazetteer (1868):

ELMSTONE-HARDWICKE, a parish partly in the hundred of Westminster, and partly in the lower division of the hundred of Deerhurst, county Gloucester, 5 miles S. of Tewkesbury. Cheltenham is its post town and railway station, from which it is distant about 4 miles to the N.W. The parish, which is situated on the high road to Worcester, contains the hamlets of Uckington and Hardwicke. The tithes have been commuted in two separate portions for each of these hamlets. The living is a vicarage in the diocese of Gloucester and Bristol, value £233, in the patronage of the lord chancellor. The church is dedicated to St. Mary Magdalene. It has a battlemented tower, and the exterior of the edifice is adorned with some curious figures in bas-relief. There are some small charities. The Dean and Chapter of Westminster are the lords of the manor. Springs similar to those at Cheltenham are met with in this parish.

Elmstone-Hardwicke has an interesting History with regard to the use of its land. Prior to the mid 18th century, most farmers in England rotated their crops across three or four strips of land- see Crop rotation, and ‘rights of common’- see common land were claimed for grazing the unfenced land. The Inclosures Acts of the 19th century proposed the inclosure of Elmstone-Hardwicke in 1899. However, many fields remained unfenced until 1918, which villagers believe make it the last village in England to be inclosed. Following the Inclosure, many poor farmers lost their common grazing rights, so in Elmstone-Hardwicke, a 10-acre (4.0 ha) plot was set aside as a recreation ground for grazing of their animals, and a further 10 acres (40,000 m^{2}) for allotments.

These fields still exist, and although none of the current residents graze or cultivate the land as individuals, the Parish Council leases the land to a local farmer, and the money is reinvested into the community.

The land in Elmstone-Hardwicke has been mainly used for arable farming over the years, and has had some interesting crops grown there including tobacco in the 17th century.

More recently, from the early 20th century, teasel growing was established in the village, it continued until the 1960s, and is well remembered by some of the older inhabitants. The teasels were used in the textile industry to raise the nap on the cloth, but were superseded by nylon brushes.

Elmstone-Hardwicke is mentioned in the Domesday Book, where it is called Almundeston. As part of the Deerhurst Hundred, the land of the manor was held by radknights (free men), who ensured that the land was farmed for the Lord. In Elmstone, the named free man was Beorhtric, although it also states that it was held by Reinbald...

The first mention of Almundeston is, according to British History Online in 889, when it was known as Almundingtoun, Hardwicke was noted in 1086, and the two parishes were first noted together in 1378.

There are other interesting names in the locality:

Low-di-low Lane is a No Through Road, which runs through the heart of the Village and marks the boundary between the parishes of Uckington and Elmstone-Hardwicke.

Dog Bark Lane is a Restricted Byway which connects Elmstone-Hardwicke and its neighbour Swindon Village, and is regularly used by walkers, cyclists and horse-riders. It is believed to be named after the call of the male foxes who live along the route.

Murder Meadow (or Murder Ground) belongs to one of the small-holdings in Elmstone-Hardwicke, but is in fact just over the boundary in Stoke Orchard. Although the name appears on the deeds from the early 19th century, no evidence has been found to substantiate the origins of the name, although local folklore suggests that it was a crime of passion and the murder was committed by a jealous husband!

== See also ==
- Knightsbridge
