= Wingmoor Farm Meadow =

Nature reserve in Gloucestershire, England

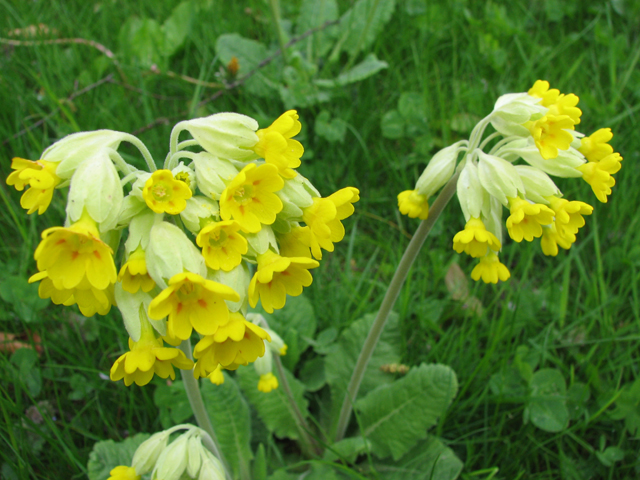
- Example - Cowslips (Primula veris)

- Location within Gloucestershire
- Type: Gloucestershire Wildlife Trust nature reserve
- Location: Severn Vale north of Cheltenham
- Coordinates: 51°56′40.6″N 2°5′32.4″W
- Area: 7.4 acres (3.0 ha)
- Created: 1990
- Operator: Gloucestershire Wildlife Trust
- Status: Access by permit

Wingmoor Farm Meadow (grid reference SO937273) is a 3-hectare (7.4-acre) nature reserve in Gloucestershire. The site is listed in the ‘Tewkesbury Borough Local Plan to 2011’, adopted March 2006, Appendix 3 'Nature Conservation',' as a Key Wildlife Site (KWS).

The site is managed by the Gloucestershire Wildlife Trust under lease agreement from the Grundon Group.

== Location and habitat ==
The meadow is about three miles north of Cheltenham near Stoke Orchard and Bishop's Cleeve. It is in the Severn Vale. It is a single meadow within an area of gravel extraction and reclamation.

The field is narrow ridge-and-furrow. This is created by the way it has been ploughed. Views on the purpose of ridge-and-furrow range from the wish to increase the surface area of the field to improving the drainage systems. The soils of the Severn Vale are clay so this kind of management would help to achieve improved drainage. Many fields in the Vale of Gloucester and the Midlands were traditionally ridge-and-furrow meadows, but are now rare.

There is a field pond site in the north-west corner.

== Flora ==
The meadow is unimproved grassland and supports a variety of plants. There is a mixture of plants which flourish on neutral and calcareous soils. The ridges support a diverse flora and these include Cowslip, Burnet-saxifrage, Common Restharrow, Pepper-saxifrage (Silaum silaus) and Field Scabious. Lady's Bedstraw and Meadow Barley are also recorded. The furrows being damper support Tufted Hair-grass, Cock's-foot and Hard Rush (Juncus inflexus).

The pond is surrounded by Willow and Hawthorn. There is a line of Crack Willow on the western edge of the meadow. There are mixed hedges on the remaining sides.

== Conservation ==
Meadow management to preserve and to increase species of flowers requires hay-cutting followed by grazing by sheep.

== Publications ==
- Kelham, A, Sanderson, J, Doe, J, Edgeley-Smith, M, et al., 1979, 1990, 2002 editions, 'Nature Reserves of the Gloucestershire Trust for Nature Conservation/Gloucestershire Wildlife Trust'
- ‘Nature Reserve Guide – discover the wild Gloucestershire on your doorstep’ - 50th Anniversary, January 2011, Gloucestershire Wildlife Trust
