= Knightsbridge, Gloucestershire =

Coordinates: 51°56′20″N 2°09′23″W

Knightsbridge
- Hamlet
- Location within the United Kingdom
- Country: England
- Sovereign state: United Kingdom

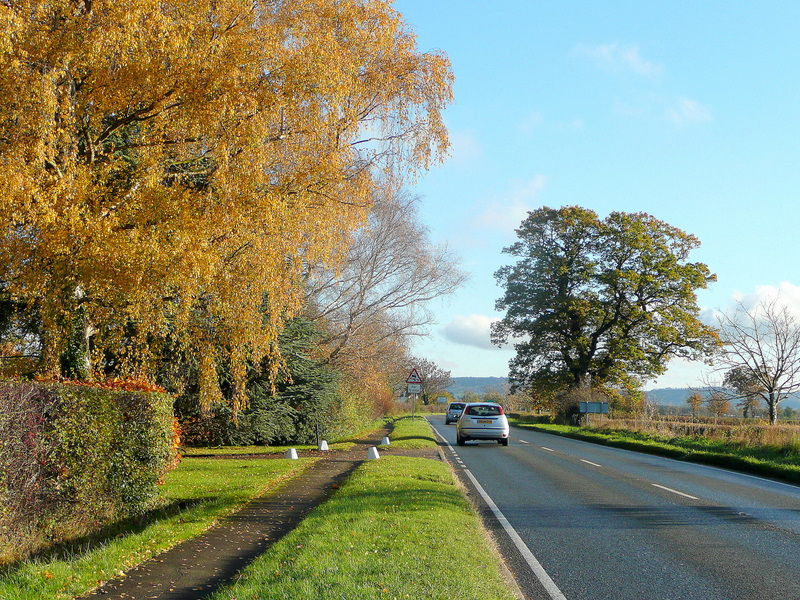
A4019 at Knightsbridge

Knightsbridge is a hamlet neighbouring Elmstone-Hardwicke and Uckington, close to Junction 10 of the M5 motorway, near Cheltenham in Gloucestershire, England. In addition to residential housing, Knightsbridge is home to a small business park.
