= Coombe Hill Canal =

Canal in the United Kingdom

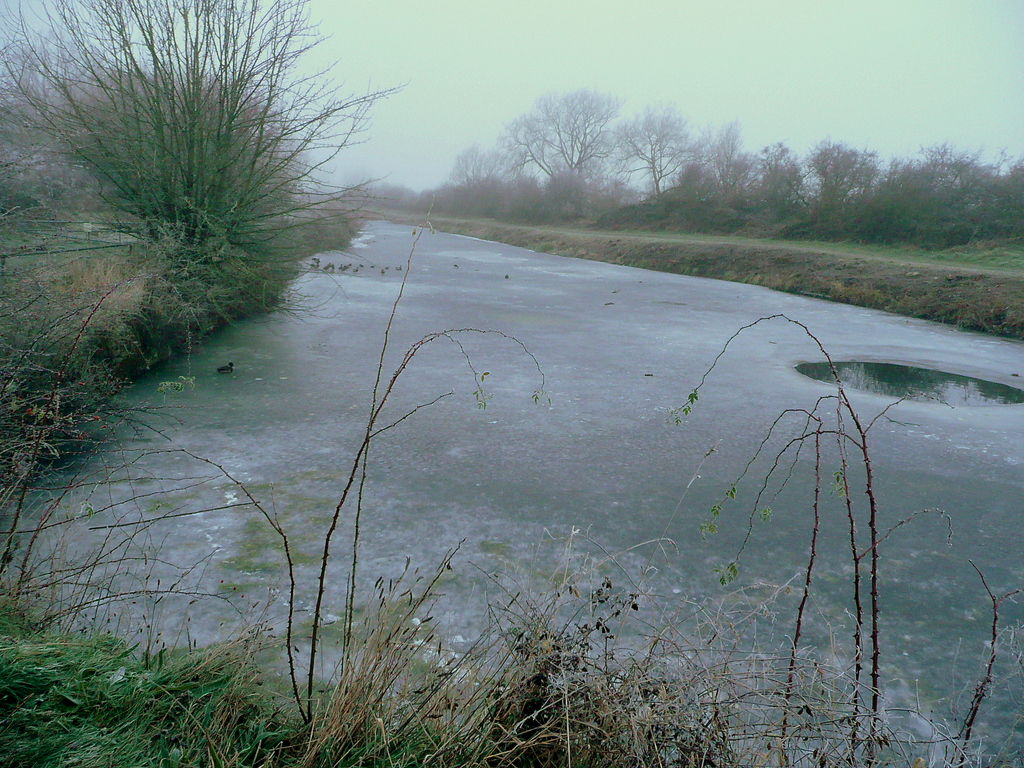
- The frozen canal from the terminal wharf
- Interactive map of Coombe Hill Canal

Specifications
- Locks: 1
- Status: unnavigable

History
- Date of act: 1792
- Date completed: 1796
- Date closed: 1876

Geography
- Start point: Coombe Hill wharf
- End point: Wainlode Hill
- Connects to: River Severn

Coombe Hill Canal lies in the Vale of Gloucester, south west England, north of Leigh and runs west 2.75 miles (4.43 km) from Coombe Hill Basin to the River Severn near Wainlode Hill. It opened in 1796 and closed 80 years later in 1876, after the only lock was damaged by flooding. The Gloucestershire Wildlife Trust purchased the Coombe Hill Canal nature reserve in 1985 and the area is managed by the trust. Adjacent to the Coombe Hill Canal is a large area of wet meadowland situated midway between Gloucester and Tewkesbury to the west of the A38, which was purchased by the trust in 1999. There is a north and a south meadow. This land and the canal itself often flood in winter, which attracts hundreds of wildfowl.

== History ==
The canal was authorised by the Leigh and Deerhurst Canal Act 1792 (32 Geo. 3. c. 83) and was probably open in 1796. The cost of construction was about £5,000 and the completed canal could take barges of 60-70 tons.

It was meant to carry goods to Cheltenham but the local geography made that impossible. There was a gap of nearly five miles between the canal and the town, so the canal was not as useful as it might have been.

In 1810 the canal was leased to a group of three men for £400 per annum. In 1822 the canal was leased to a number of committeemen from the Worcester and Birmingham Canal. In 1829 they renewed their lease for another 21 years at £500 per year and in 1844 offered to buy the canal for £8,750, but they later withdrew the offer. In 1849 the lease was taken up by the Staffordshire and Worcestershire Canal, which was unable to make the canal pay, and when it surrendered the lease in 1867 cargo fell to 1,800 tons per annum. The Coombe Hill Canal Company then asked the engineer of the Gloucester and Sharpness Canal to provide a report. The report took the view that the canal could not be made profitable and it would be best turned into an oyster bed. Despite this the canal company tried to run the canal itself for a few years before selling it for £520 in 1871.

Coombe Hill Canal Navigation (Abandonment) Act 1876
- Act of Parliament
- Parliament of the United Kingdom
- Long title: An Act to provide for the closing of the Coombe Hill Canal Navigation, and the Sale of the Site thereof; and for other purposes.
- Citation: 39 & 40 Vict. c. xxx

Dates
- Royal assent: 1 June 1876

The canal was resold for £1,000 in 1873 but in 1876 it was abandoned under the Coombe Hill Canal Navigation (Abandonment) Act 1876 (39 & 40 Vict. c. xxx) due to the new owners being unable to afford to repair flood damage to the lock that connected it to the River Severn.

== SSSI status ==
In 1954 the canal and certain fenland and flood meadow areas were notified as a biological Site of Special Scientific Interest and renotified in 1995 for boundary alterations. In 1999 the meadows around the middle of the canal were purchased by the Gloucestershire Wildlife Trust, which is restoring the wetland. The meadows are on either side of the canal. The canal is the home of a number of rare and uncommon beetle species, and of two species of fly that have not been found anywhere else in the UK.

== The Gloucestershire Wildlife Trust Reserve ==
Coombe Hill Canal
- Site of Special Scientific Interest
- Location within Gloucestershire
- Location of Coombe Hill Canal.
- Area of search: Gloucestershire
- Grid reference: SO887272
- Coordinates: 51.943634°N 2.165072°W
- Interest: Biological
- Area: 20.16 ha (49.8 acres)
- Notification date: 1954

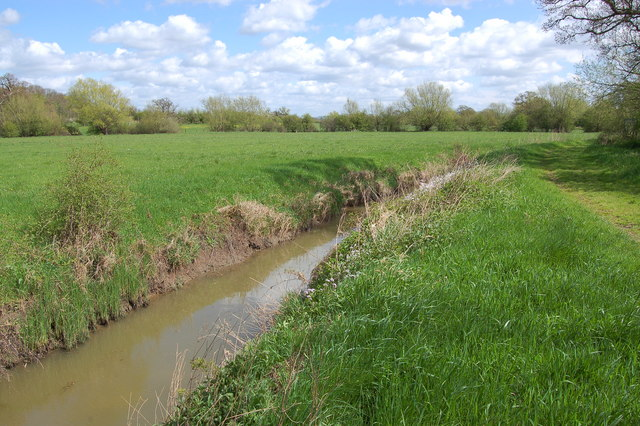
Coombe Hill nature reserve

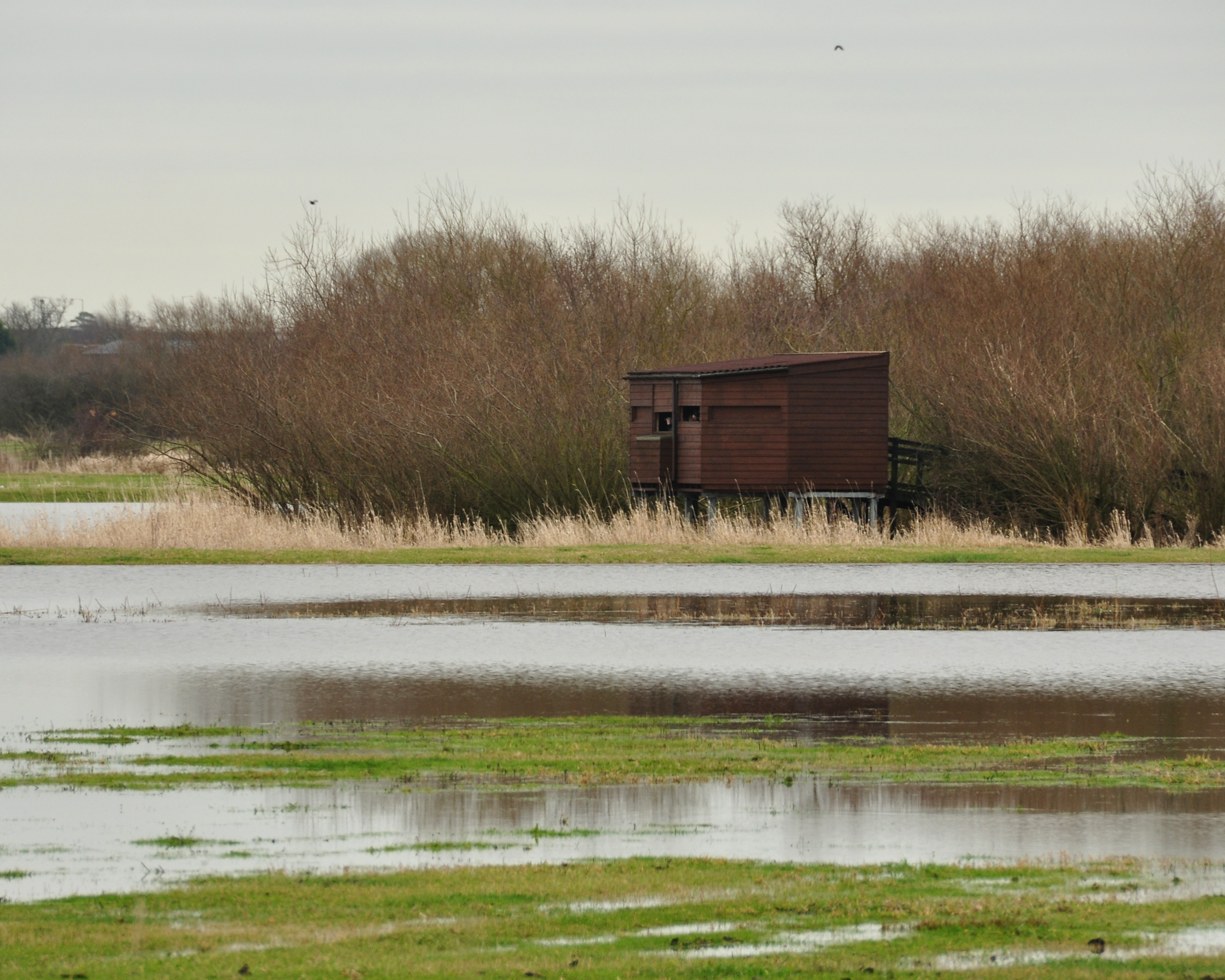
Wigeon bird hide at Coombe Hill nature reserve

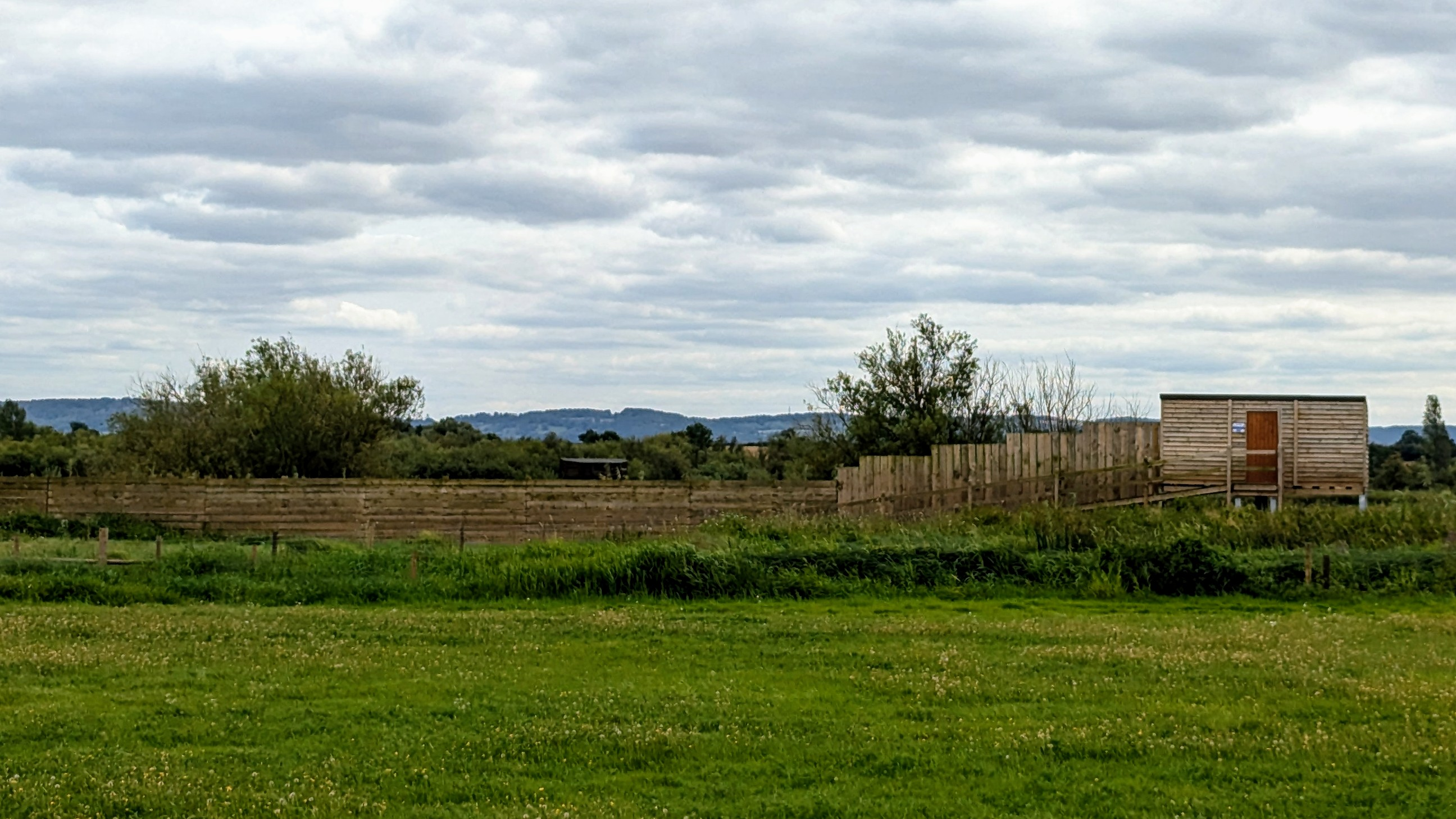
Teal bird hide at Coombe Hill nature reserve

Fuller information is provided in the Gloucestershire Wildlife Trust nature reserves handbook. The canal was built to link the Forest of Dean coalfields with Cheltenham via the Severn, but competition and other reasons led to its closure. The trust has carried out management work with aid of Severn Trent Water and the then Nature Conservancy Council to restore the derelict canal.

The nature reserve has two wooden bird hides, Teal and Wigeon (formally Grundon). Wigeon hide is on the canal side of the reserve and accessed via a raised walkway. Teal hide is on the northern side of the reserve and accessed through fields surrounding the wetland.

The area was severely flooded in the Gloucestershire Floods of 2007 and significant restoration work was necessary.

=== Coombe Hill Canal ===
The site is listed in the ‘Tewkesbury Borough Local Plan to 2011’, adopted March 2006, Appendix 3 'Nature Conservation',' as a Key Wildlife Site (KWS).

Fuller information for Coombe Hill Canal (grid reference SO887272) is provided in the Gloucestershire Wildlife Trust nature reserves handbook. It is a 20.16-hectare (49.8-acre) site overall (standing water, canals, fen, marsh and swamp lowland). The clearance work has been beneficial to aquatic and bankside plants. Flourishing uncommon species include fine-leaved water-dropwort, common meadow-rue and cyperus sedge. Also recorded are purple-loosestrife, yellow iris and skullcap. The management of nettles preserves a colony of the parasitic greater dodder.

There is grassland scrub on the towpath. strawberry clover, oxeye daisy and the Severn Vale speciality, corky-fruited water-dropwort, are present along the path.

The scrub provides a habitat for breeding blackcap, whitethroat and willow warbler. Flocks of fieldfare and redwing are reported as feasting on hawthorn berries in winter. Large numbers of Eurasian teal, mallard, Eurasian wigeon and Bewick's swan, together with the occasional pintail, gadwall and goldeneye, are seen on the adjacent flood meadows.

The site is important for beetles, particularly those associated with tufted hair-grass. A significant number of dragonfly and damselfly species are recorded. A series of open lagoons separated by dense reed beds has been created by selective dredging. Scrub-cutting on a rotational basis maintains habitat for breeding birds and, with clearance of the towpath, also keeps the Canal edges clear of tall vegetation.

=== Coombe Hill Meadows ===
The site is listed in the ‘Tewkesbury Borough Local Plan to 2011’, adopted March 2006, Appendix 3 'Nature Conservation',' as a Key Wildlife Site (KWS).

Fuller information for Coombe Hill Meadows (grid reference SO874273) is provided in the Gloucestershire Wildlife Trust nature reserves handbook. The north meadow part of the reserve is a 55-hectare (140-acre) site of wet grassland and drainage ditches. With the addition of the south meadow the full site (canal and meadows) is a 105-hectare (260-acre) reserve. Historically, management of the area included drainage with some of the meadows ploughed (reducing wildlife interest). Restoration work includes control of drainage to enhance the wildlife interest. Ditches have been restored by widening and re-profiling to improve their wildlife value. The rare true fox sedge may be found in some of the ditches.

A number of clay bunds have been put in place. Their purpose is to hold back the water into late summer. Two large shallow pools, called scrapes, have been excavated in the meadows next to the canal as well as a smaller pond next to the public footpath. The 2007 Gloucestershire floods resulted in major remedial work as a result of the devastation caused.

During the winter months the flooded meadows attract wintering wildfowl such as northern pintail, Eurasian teal and Eurasian wigeon, as well as Bewick's swan. As the floodwater recedes the bare mud around the ditches and scrapes, and the area of fen provide breeding and foraging habitat for waders such as common snipe. The hay meadows at the back of the reserve are ideal for Eurasian curlew nesting. In 2010 it is reported that Eurasian oystercatchers have bred for the first time, and six pairs of northern lapwing chicks have also been seen.

The conservation programme aims to maintain a good wetland habitat which will benefit the important gatherings of birds, invertebrates and plants on the reserve. Conservation work includes hedgerow layering, pollarding of willows and cutting for hay.

== Points of interest ==
Point	Coordinates (Links to map resources)	OS Grid Ref	Notes
Coombe Hill wharf	51.9435°N 2.1673°W	SO885272	Terminus
Road bridge	51.9372°N 2.2201°W	SO849265	
Entrance lock	51.9357°N 2.2229°W	SO847263	Jn with River Severn

== See also ==
- Canals of the United Kingdom
- History of the British canal system

== Bibliography ==
- Green, Colin (1999). Severn Traders. Black Dwarf Publications. ISBN 0-9533028-2-2.
- Hadfield, Charles (1985). The Canals of The West Midlands (3rd Ed.). Newton Abbot: David and Charles. ISBN 0-7153-8644-1.
- Kelham, A; Sanderson, J; Doe, J; Edgeley-Smith, M; et al. (2002). Nature Reserves of the Gloucestershire Trust for Nature Conservation/Gloucestershire Wildlife Trust (1979, 1990, 2002 ed.).
- 'Coombe Hill Nature Reserve - Restoration of a major Severn wetland (Information and Circular Walk)', (undated), Gloucestershire Wildlife Trust
