= RAF Stoke Orchard =

Former RAF station in Gloucestershire, England

RAF Stoke Orchard
- Near Stoke Orchard, Gloucestershire in England

Site information
- Type: Royal Air Force Station
- Owner: Air Ministry
- Operator: Royal Air Force
- Controlled by: RAF Flying Training Command

Location
- Shown within Gloucestershire RAF Stoke Orchard (the United Kingdom)
- Coordinates: 51°56′46″N 002°06′45″W

Site history
- Built: 1940
- In use: 1941 - 1945
- Battles/wars: European theatre of World War II

Airfield information
Runways
Direction	Length and surface
01/19	Grass

Royal Air Force Stoke Orchard or more simply RAF Stoke Orchard is a former Royal Air Force station near the village of Stoke Orchard, north west of Cheltenham, Gloucestershire during the Second World War.

== History ==
In 1939 plans were made to develop an airfield at Stoke Orchard. The airfield was developed in 1940–41, originally as a Relief Landing Ground. In September 1941 it became a training airfield for No. 10 Elementary Flying Training School RAF, who moved from Weston-Super-Mare with 54 de Havilland Tiger Moth training aircraft. On 23 May 1942, T.M. aircraft R4894 crashed, killing both the trainee and instructor. The training school departed the airfield in July 1942 as pilot training was centralised and in large part relocated to Canada.

From July 1942 to January 1945, No. 3 Glider Training School RAF (3 GTS) used the airfield for specialised glider pilot training in Hotspur gliders. 3 GTS also used RAF Northleach.

The following units were also based at the airfield during this period

- No. 5 Maintenance Unit RAF
- WAAF Officers' School
- USAAF 47th Liaison Squadron (April 9-25, 1944), attached to the First United States Army Group with Stinson L-5 Sentinel liaison aircraft.

It was also home to a Ministry for Aircraft Production shadow factory run by the Gloster Aircraft Company. There were two large buildings, Assembly Shed 39 and Flight Shed 40. The factory produced Hawker Typhoons, with the first aircraft leaving the flight shed on 7 September 1942. A firing range on the far side of the airfield was used for gun calibration prior to new aircraft departing for the parent factory at Brockworth, for delivery to the RAF. There are unconfirmed reports that Hawker Hurricanes were also produced at the site.

Following the war, part of the site was taken over by the Coal Research Establishment of the National Coal Board, which remained until 1995. Flight Shed 40, was purchased by Tate & Lyle.

== Current use ==
Today the airfield has been returned to agricultural use and a waste plant.

The former Coal Board site has now been developed as a housing estate by Bloor Homes, with the streets named after significant names relating to the former RAF base and Gloster Aircraft Company such as Armstrong Road, Whittle Close, Feddon [sic] Close, Hurricane Drive and Zura Drive.

== See also ==
- List of former Royal Air Force stations
