= Walter Ernest Dixon =

British pharmacologist and fellow of the Royal Society

Walter Ernest Dixon FRS OBE (2 June 1871 – 16 August 1931) was a British pharmacologist and fellow of the Royal Society.

== Early life ==
He was born in Darlington, County Durham and educated at school in Darlington and at Dulwich, gaining a Science Entrance Scholarship to St. Thomas's Hospital in 1890. He later obtained degrees from both London University and Cambridge University.

== Career ==
Dixon became a house physician and then a demonstrator at St. Thomas's in the Department of Physiology. He was also appointed to Lecturership in Pharmacology at Cambridge University, where he resided, going up to London to King's College, London to deliver his lectures, where he held the post of Professor of Materia Medica and Pharmacology.

He was elected a Fellow of the Royal Society in 1911. His candidacy citation read: "Professor of Pharmacology. Distinguished as a pharmacologist. Professor of Pharmacology, King's College, London. Assistant to the Downing Professor of Medicine, Cambridge."

During the First World War he played a leading role in a spy ring along the Mediterranean coast of southern Spain that sought to prevent German submarine attacks on British shipping. Other members of the ring included the general manager of the Great Southern of Spain Railway, George Lee Boag, and the Scottish aristocrat Hugh Pakenham Borthwick.

In 1919 he was appointed Reader in Pharmacology at Cambridge. The same year he was awarded OBE in 1919 for his contributions during the First World War.

== Death ==
Dixon died in Whittlesford, Cambridgeshire in 1931.

== Selected publications ==
His publications cited for his candidacy for FRS in 1911 included:

- WE Dixon 'A Manual of Pharmacology' (1906);
- articles in Allbutt's 'System of Medicine,'
- articles in Hale White's 'Pharmacology.'
- 'The Action of the Alkaloids from Anhalonium Lewinii ' (Journ Physiol, vol xxv);
- 'The Action of some New Preparations from Cannabis Indica' (Br Med Journ, 1899);
- 'The Action of Poehl's Spermine' (Journ Physiol, vol xxv);
- 'The Action of Indian Podophyllin' (Edin Med Journ, 1900);
- 'The Composition and Action of Orchitic Extracts' (Journ Physiol, vol xxvi);
- 'The Innervation of the Testis' (Proc Brit Assoc, 1901);
- 'The Innervation of the Frog's Stomach' (Journ Physiol, vol xxviii);
- 'Hypodermic Purgatives' (Br Med Journ, 1902);
- 'The Bronchial Muscles' (with T G Brodie, Journ Physiol, vol xxix);
- 'Action of Drugs on Nerve cells and Nerve endings with special reference to Apocodeine' (Journ Physiol, vol xxx);
- 'Vaso-motor Nerve to the Lung' (with T G Brodie, ibid, vol xxx);
- 'The Selective Action of Cocaine on Nerve Fibres' (ibid, vol xxxii);
- 'The Clioscribe' (with O Inchley, ibid, vol xxxii);
- 'The Pathology of Asthma' (with T G Brodie, Trans Path Soc, vol liv);
- 'The Bio-chemical Standardisation of Drugs' (Trans Pharm Confer, 1905);
- 'The Bio-chemical Standardisation of Drugs' (with G S Haynes, 1905);
- 'Drug Fallacies' (Br Med Journ, 1906);
- 'The Mode of Action of Drugs' (Med Mag, 1907);
- 'A Delicate Volume Recorder' (Journ Physiol, 1907);
- 'The Gaseous Metabolism of the Mammalian Heart' (with J Barcroft, ibid, vol xxxv);
- 'The Action of Alcohol on the Circulation' (Journ Physiol, vol xxxv);
- 'The Action of Placental Extract' (Internat Congr Physiol, 1907);
