= Outline of physiology =

Overview of and topical guide to physiology

The following outline is provided as an overview of and topical guide to physiology:

Physiology – scientific study of the normal function in living systems. A branch of biology, its focus is in how organisms, organ systems, organs, cells, and biomolecules carry out the chemical or physical functions that exist in a living system.

== Description ==
Physiology can be described as all of the following:

- An academic discipline
- A branch of science
  - A branch of biology

== Branches ==
By approach

- Applied physiology
  - Clinical physiology
  - Exercise physiology
  - Nutrition physiology
- Comparative physiology
- Mathematical physiology

By organism

- Animal physiology
  - Mammal physiology
    - Human physiology
  - Fish physiology
  - Insect physiology
- Plant physiology

By process

- Developmental physiology
- Ecophysiology
- Evolutionary physiology

By subsystem

- Cardiovascular physiology
- Renal physiology
- Defense physiology
- Gastrointestinal physiology
- Musculoskeletal physiology
- Neurophysiology
- Respiratory physiology

== History ==
History of physiology

== Organizations ==
- American Physiological Society
- International Union of Physiological Sciences

== Publications ==
- American Journal of Physiology
- Experimental Physiology
- Journal of Applied Physiology

== Influential persons ==
- List of Nobel laureates in Physiology or Medicine
- List of physiologists

== See also ==
- Outline of biology
