= Wainlode Cliff =

Geological Site of Special Scientific Interest in Gloucestershire, England

- Site of Special Scientific Interest
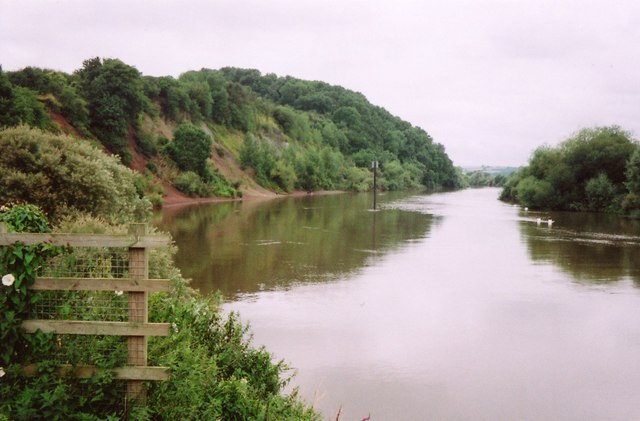

- Location within Gloucestershire
- Location of Wainlode Cliff.
- Area of search: Gloucestershire
- Grid reference: SO845257
- Coordinates: 51.930046°N 2.226104°W
- Interest: Geological
- Area: 1.3 ha (3.2 acres)
- Notification date: 1954

Wainlode Cliff (grid reference SO845257) is a privately owned 1.3 hectare geological Site of Special Scientific Interest in Gloucestershire, notified in 1954. It overlooks Hasfield Ham.

== Geology ==
This an historic locality which was first described in 1842 and shows a seven-metre section of Rhaetian age. The site mains the regional two-fold division of Westbury and Cotham Beds. The Insect Limestone, which is a productive source of insects, defines the base of the Lias.

== Gallery ==
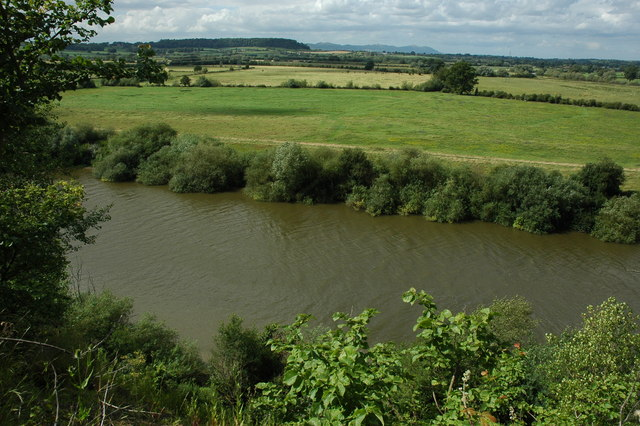
View from above Wainlode Cliff overlooking Hasfield Ham

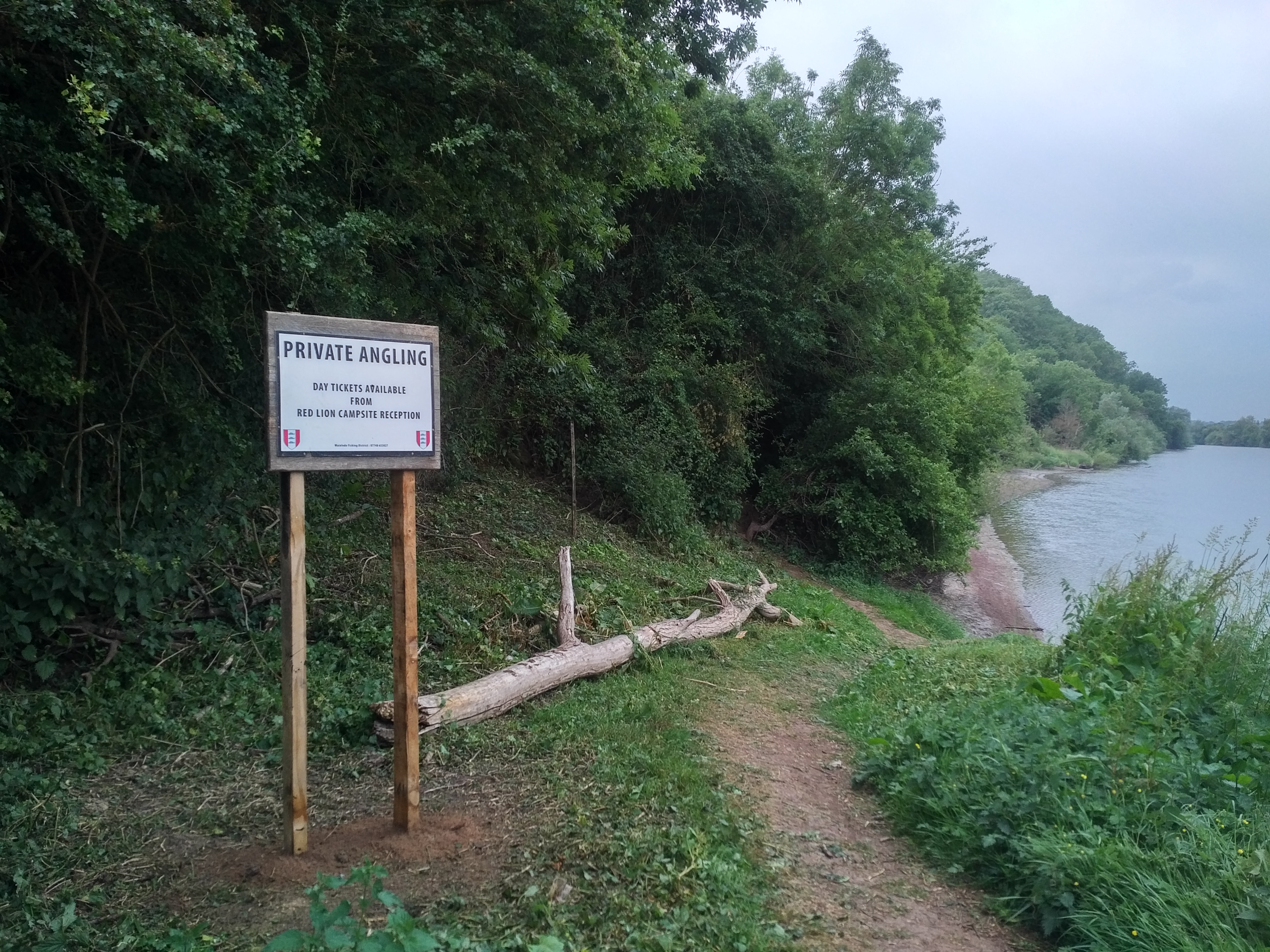
Fishing sign for Wainlode Cliff and access to the riverbank.

== Sources ==
- Natural England SSSI information on citation, map and unit details
- Natural England SSSI information on the Wainlode Cliff unit
