= Great Southern of Spain Railway =

Spanish-British railway company

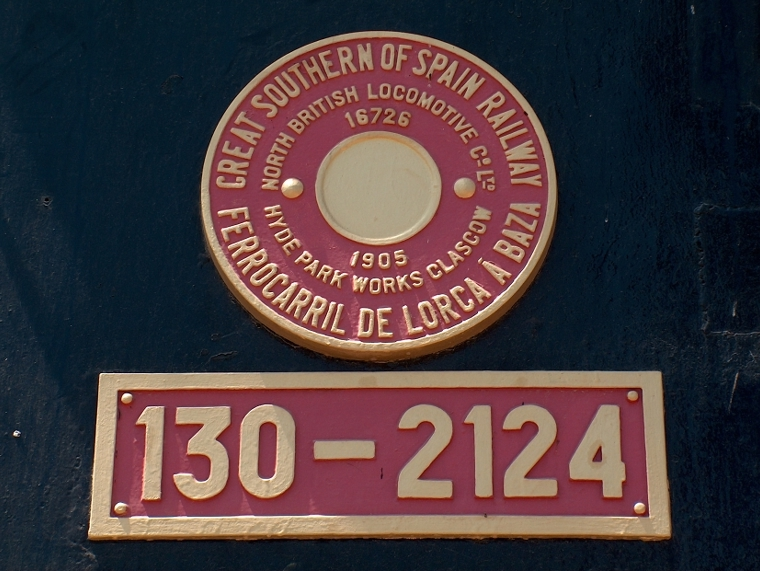
Locomotive No 130-2124 plate

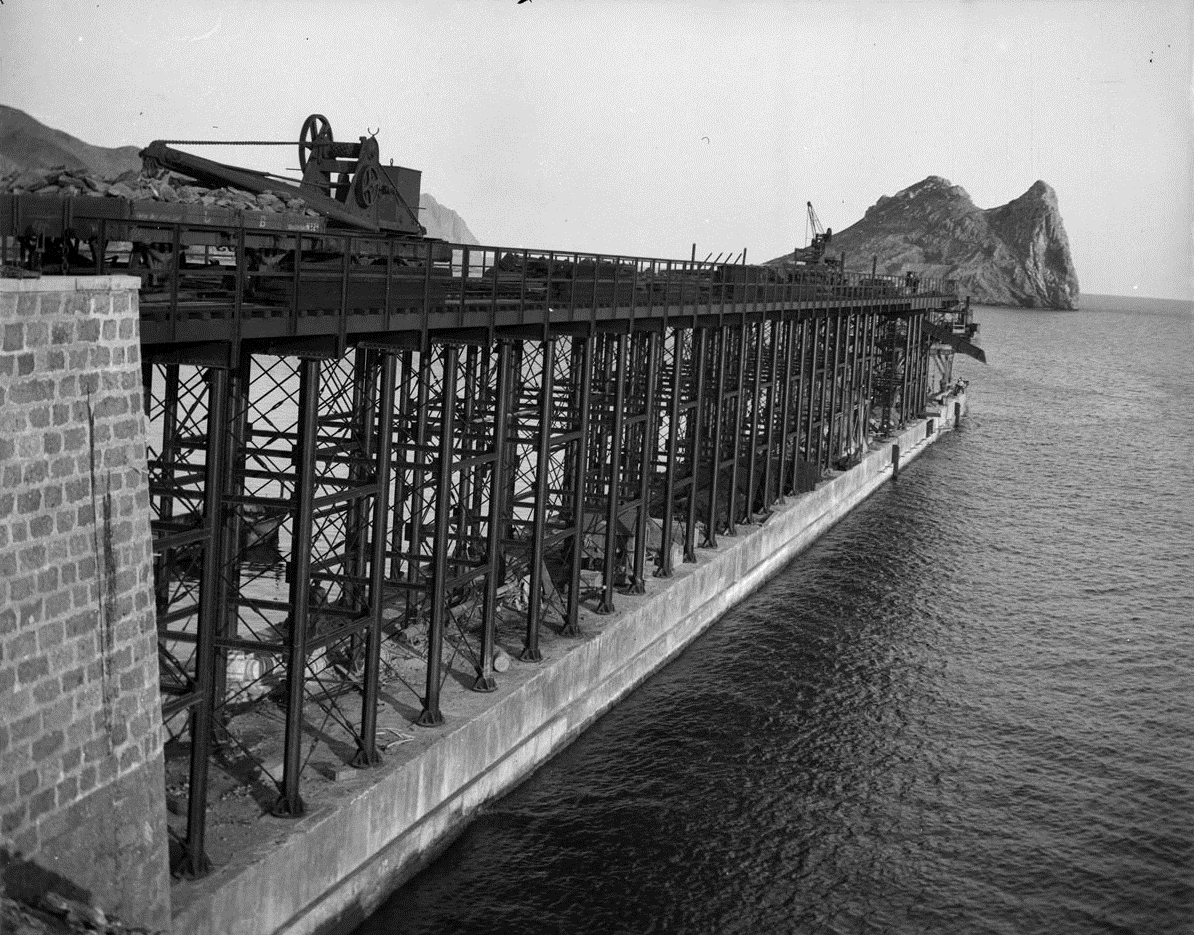
Building El Hornillo Pier, Águilas, ca. 1902

The Great Southern of Spain Railway (GSSR) was a British railway company that operated in southern Spain between the late 19th and mid-20th centuries. It owned two railway lines: the Lorca-Baza and the Almendricos-Águilas, developing an important activity in the transport of minerals.

== History ==
=== Context ===
In Spain, the advent of the Industrial Revolution was impeded by the conflicts inherent to the end of the Old Regime. The railway, a marker for that Revolution, was left to private initiatives and led to uneven development and modernization across the country. Barcelona-Mataró was the first line built by a British company in 1837, but then George Stephenson, (Note: Burgos et al. (2021) give "the negative impressions formed by the brilliant English engineer George Stephenson (1803-1859) after making studies in situ in 1845". This mistakes the father for the son, or vice-versa: there is the father George Stephenson (1781-1848) and the son Robert Stephenson (1803-1859). The wikipedia article on George Stephenson does not mention Spain, but that on Robert Stephenson says "in 1845 [...] George was returning ill from a trip to Spain" and also says that son Robert did go to Spain but only in 1839. So Burgos et al. (2021) mistake is probably on the dates of birth and death, giving those of Robert instead of George's.) "the Father of Railways", made a negative report on Spanish railway development in 1845 and the British largely withdrew, leaving the field to French entrepreneurs and engineers – R. Carr speaks of an invasion of Spain by young graduates of the École Polytechnique. – who brought in new building techniques and in particular metal bridges. Years 1855-1865 saw some expansion to the railway network but this slowed down after it was seen that businesses did not respond as expected. That left the south-east of Spain quite devoid of any sort of train connection: building train lines among such harsh topography could only be done at prohibitive costs for little traffic. That changed drastically once it was realized that the sierra de Los Filabres to the east of Andalusia, and Linares in the north-east, were very rich in ores and that connecting these mines to the sea would easily bring in the expected return on investment.

=== Consession and concessions ===
This company was incorporated on 15th of December 1885. It was set up to connect the provinces of Murcia, Almería and Granada with a railway from Águilas and Lorca (in Murcia province) to Granada, passing through the Almanzora Valley and Baza.

The operating concession for the Granada-Murcia line was awarded in 1885 to the British entrepreneur Edmund Sykes Hett, who transferred it to the GSSR in 1887. This very simple sentence is far from giving an accurate representation of the very complex and subtle tractations, deals, compromises, negotiations, involved in the process of attributing concessions. The 1840s in particular were marred by speculation and corruption around such concessions.

Thus, concession 3 was authorised in July 1870 and that same month E. S. Hett paid the deposit allowing him to bid for it. In October 1881 the company Crédito General de Ferrocarriles S.A. makes a petition to be given the concession 3; this request is rejected. In August 1884, the Murcia – Lorca section of the line is removed from concession 3 because Crédito General de Ferrocarriles S.A. has already constructed a line. In November 1884, the auction for concession 3 is announced and its tariffs and fares are set out. In March 1885 E. S. Hett gets concession 3 – and for some unknown reason he is the sole bidder...

=== The lines ===
The Hett, Maylor Company Ltd was set up as a construction company to build the line, and engaged itself with the new GSSR Limited. But it grossly underestimated the difficulties and costs of going through the rough mountainous grounds, and unknowingly signed its own demise with a contract binding it to a fixed price. Moreover, a subcontractor caused trouble and cost them money. In 1890, Hett, Maylor & Co went bankrupt. At that stage, the section Lorca - Almendricos - Águilas was running, as well as the section Almendricos - Huércal-Overa; the section Huércal-Overa - Zurgena was built but not yet officially approved; and the rest of the line to Granada was inexistent. Another company had built the Murcia - Lorca section. And GSSR was left with the whole sierra de Los Filabres and sierra de Baza to go through. Eventually, the GSSR had to undergo a restructuring; and it took the railway only as far as Baza, just one step over the border in Granada province.

It is worth mentioning that the metal bridge of Gor was designed by engineer James Livesey (Note: The tourist industry likes to promote the marketing scam that Gustave Eiffel had anything to do with the conception of that bridge. This is most likely based on the aspect of the first design project of the bridge made by James Livesey for the GSSR in 1890, where the bridge very much resembles the lower levels / "feet" of the Eiffel Tower (see figure 2 in Burgos et al. 2021, p. 53). But no serious paper lays any claim to that Eiffel had any hand in that bridge whatsoever, as asserted by a search in Google Scholar : ""gor " bridge "eiffel"". scholar.google.fr..) for the Great Southern of Spain Railway; but as that company stopped at Baza, his plan was used by the Granada Railway Ltd that completed that line up to Guadix. (In Guadix it joined the Linares – Almería line, built between 1889 and 1899 by a Franco-Spanish consortium called La Compañía de Caminos de Hierro del Sur de España.)
That bridge is three times famed: it is the fist cantilever bridge built in Spain; it was (rather unfairly) nicknamed "the tin bridge" because water infiltrations in its east-side footing prevented it being ever properly used and forced its abandonment as soon as it was built; and it was relocated to Dúrcal in the 1920s, where it still stands to this day in 2025; the Granada - Dúrcal tramway line was stopped in 1974 and the FEVE (Ferrocarriles de Vía Estrecha, or narrow gauge railways) meant to remove all its structures. But in 1976 the ministry for Public Works gave the bridge to Dúrcal townhall. It is seen as one of the best metal works in Andalusia.

The state railway operator Renfe managed that railway until 31st of December 1984. But during that decade, many lines were closed including the GSSR's because of the disastrous state of the railway infrastructure and the lack of money; however the section Águilas to Lorca and Murcia was kept open up until January 2022, with the support from Águilas council.

== See also ==
=== Connex articles ===
- Gustave Gillman (1856-1922), British engineer, photographer and a major actor in the Great Southern of Spain Railway
- Granada Railway Company Limited
- Mediterranean corridor (Spain)

=== Bibliography ===
- Cuéllar Villar, Domingo (2009). "Y Stephenson dijo no: Los capitales británicos en los ferrocarriles españoles" (PDF). Actas del V Congreso De Historia Ferroviaria, Palma de Mallorca.

=== External links ===
- "Great Southern of Spain Railway". gssr.es.
- "The Great Southern of Spain Railway (The GSSR)". faydon.com.
