= Anthony Cullis =

British electrical engineer (1946–2021)

Anthony George Cullis FRS (16 January 1946 – 9 December 2021) was a British electronic engineer, and professor at University of Sheffield.

== Life ==
Cullis was born on 16 January 1946 in Worcester. He earned a BA at the University of Oxford in 1968, and MA, and DPhil in Semiconducting Materials at Oxford University in 1972.

He died on 9 December 2021, at the age of 75.
