= Tredington, Gloucestershire =

Village in Gloucestershire, England

Coordinates: 51.964°N 2.140°W

Tredington
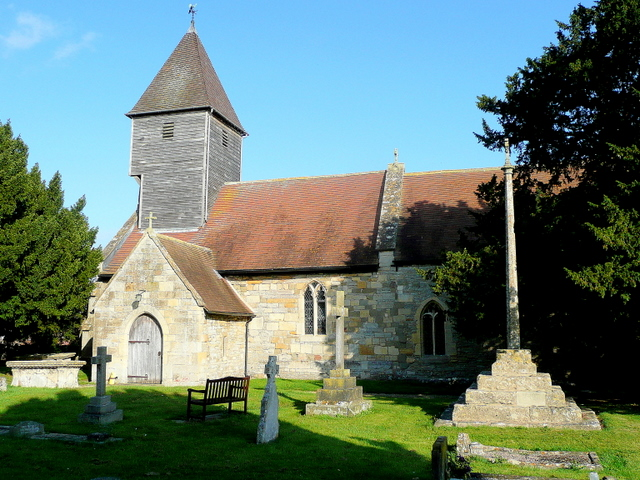
- St. John the Baptist's church, Tredington

- Location within Gloucestershire
- OS grid reference: SO903294
- Civil parish: Stoke Orchard
- District: Tewkesbury
- Shire county: Gloucestershire
- Region: South West
- Country: England
- Sovereign state: United Kingdom
- Post town: Tewkesbury
- Postcode district: GL20
- Dialling code: 01684
- Police: Gloucestershire
- Fire: Gloucestershire
- Ambulance: South Western
- UK Parliament: Tewkesbury

Tredington is a village and former civil parish, now in the parish of Stoke Orchard near Tewkesbury, in the Tewkesbury district, in the county of Gloucestershire, England. The village has a church and a school. In 1931 the parish had a population of 92.

The little church of St John the Baptist in Tredington is known for its wooden tower, a twelfth-century architectural plan, medieval stone benches, and the fossil of an ichthyosaurus displayed upon the floor of its porch. The steps, base and shaft of the churchyard cross are fourteenth century; the cross is modern.

== History ==
The village was a member of the Confraternity of Burton Lazars, a mediaeval order devoted to the care of lepers, near Melton Mowbray. The father of the musician Thomas Tomkins was incumbent of the church from 1594 to 1609.

On 1 April 1935 the parish of Tredington was merged with Stoke Orchard, part also went to Tewkesbury.

== Education ==
The village school opened in 1880, and is located halfway between Tredington and Stoke Orchard in order to serve both communities. Tredington Primary School, as it is now known, is a small community school serving the villages of Tredington, Stoke Orchard, Elmstone-Hardwicke, Walton Cardiff, Uckington and Bishop's Cleeve. In 2005 it had 61 students aged 4–11. On 1 September 2020, the school converted to academy status and became part of the Gloucestershire Learning Alliance. Since then, the school has benefited from wider funding provision from GLA and modern EYFS phonics practices supported via Mangotsfield School English Hub. The school received a strong 'Good' report from the most recent OFSTED inspection. Most children leaving this school move on to Cleeve School in Bishop's Cleeve, an establishment with a larger population (over 1000 pupils) than the villages served by Tredington School.
