= Richard Godsell =

English cricketer

Personal information
- Born: 9 January 1880; Stroud, Gloucestershire
- Died: 11 April 1954 (aged 74); Bromley, Kent
- Batting: Right-handed

Domestic team information
- Years: Team
- 1903–1910: Gloucestershire
- Source: Cricinfo, 30 March 2014

Richard Thomas Godsell (9 January 1880 – 11 April 1954) was an English cricketer. He played for Gloucestershire between 1903 and 1910. Thomas was educated at Clifton College and Trinity College, Cambridge. During World War I he was an officer in the Royal Army Service Corps.
