= William Rowlands (English cricketer) =

English cricketer

Personal information
- Born: 30 July 1883; Bristol
- Died: 29 June 1948 (aged 64); Bristol
- Batting: Right-handed

Domestic team information
- Years: Team
- 1901-1928: Gloucestershire
- Source: Cricinfo, 30 March 2014

William Rowlands (30 July 1883 – 29 June 1948) was an English cricketer. He played for Gloucestershire between 1901 and 1928.
