= Helen Leyton =

British pathologist (fl. 1905 – 1930)

Helen Gertrude Leyton (other married names Stewart and Grünbaum, fl. 1905 – 1930) was a British pathologist.

== Biography ==
She gained an MB ChB from the University of Birmingham and the London School of Medicine for Women in 1905, and an MD from the University of Birmingham in 1908.

She worked as a deputy professor of pathology at Leeds University; a pathologist at Elizabeth Garrett Anderson Hospital; and an assistant to the Metropolitan Asylums Board.

After the death of her first husband, medical doctor Robert Stewart, she married fellow pathologist A. S. Grunbaum in 1909. The pair changed their names from Grünbaum to Leyton in 1915 during the anti-German sentiment of World War I. This "husband and wife team" published together from 1916 in pathology.

With her son Geoffrey Bertrand Leyton, she patented an improved circular knitting machine in 1930.
