= Leigh, Gloucestershire =

Village in Gloucestershire, England

Coordinates: 51.9354°N 2.1864°W

Leigh
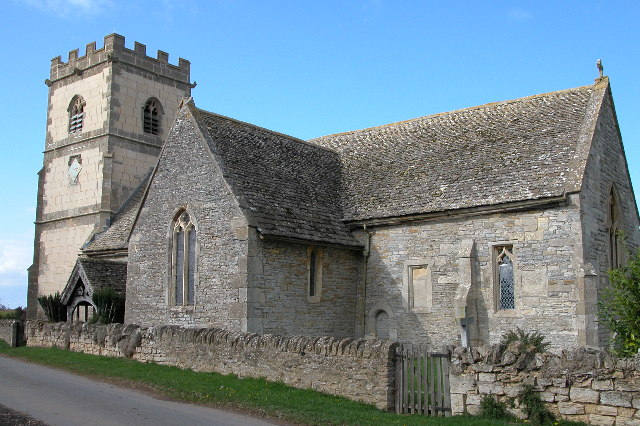
- St Catherine's Church

- Location within Gloucestershire
- Population: 325 (2019)
- Civil parish: Leigh
- District: Tewkesbury
- Shire county: Gloucestershire
- Region: South West
- Country: England
- Sovereign state: United Kingdom
- Post town: Gloucester
- Postcode district: GL19
- Police: Gloucestershire
- Fire: Gloucestershire
- Ambulance: South Western

Leigh is a village and civil parish in the district of Tewkesbury, in the county of Gloucestershire, England. As of 2019, it has a population of 325.

== History ==
The name "Leigh" means 'The wood/clearing'. Leigh was recorded in the Domesday Book as Lalege.
