= Coombe Hill, Tewkesbury =

Hamlet in Gloucestershire, England

Coordinates: 51°56′30″N 2°9′50″W

Coombe Hill
- Civil parish: Leigh
- Country: England
- Sovereign state: United Kingdom

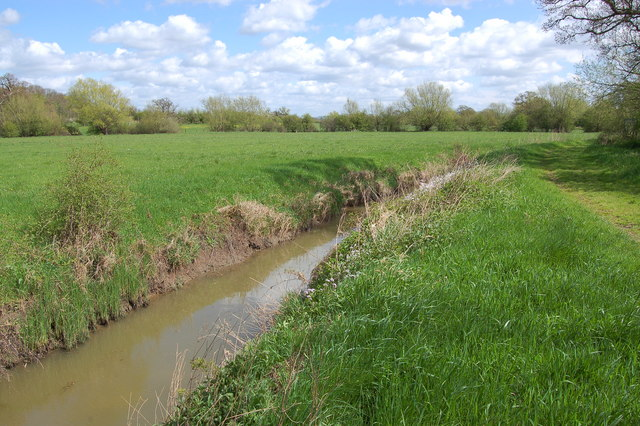
Coombe Hill Nature Reserve.

Coombe Hill is a hamlet in the civil parish of Leigh in Gloucestershire, England. It lies on the A38 road between Gloucester and Tewkesbury, at the junction with the A4019 road to Cheltenham.

Coombe Hill is the terminus of the disused Coombe Hill Canal, which joined the hamlet to the River Severn, 2.7 miles (4.3 km) west, between 1796 and 1876. It is now a nature reserve.
