= Cuthbert Edmund Cullis =

English mathematician (1868-1954)

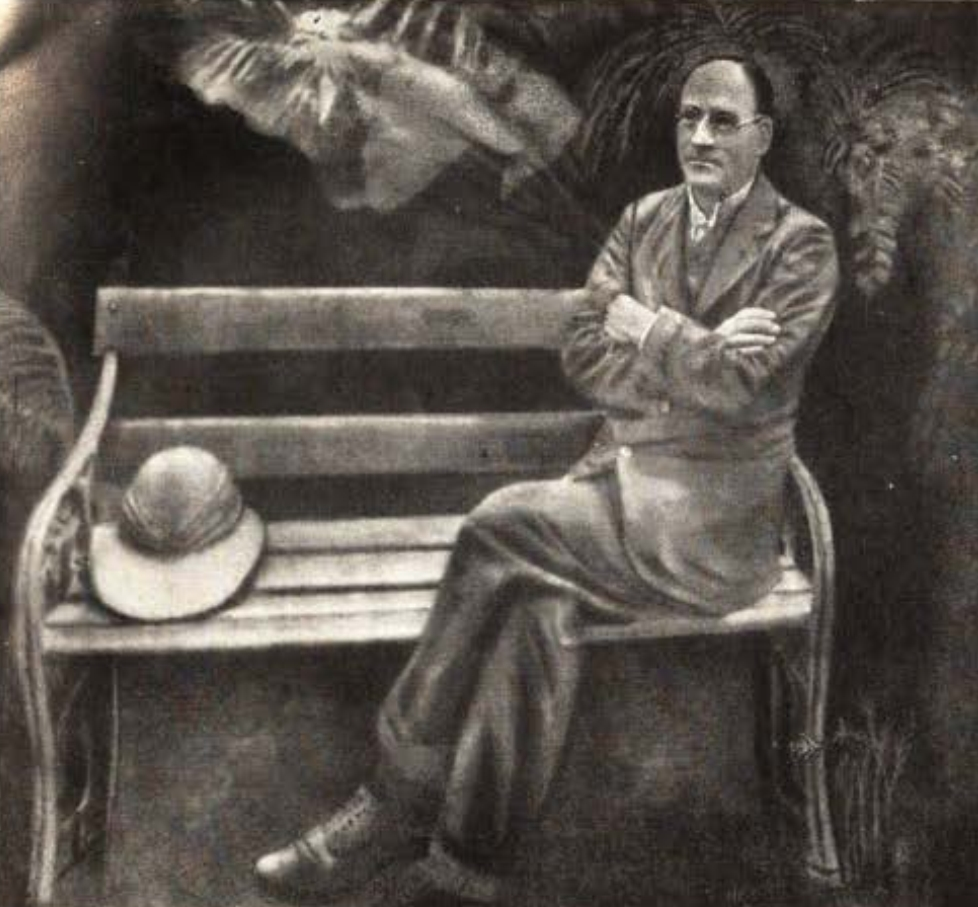

Cuthbert Edmund Cullis (15 April 1868 – 20 March 1954) was an English mathematician who worked as a professor of mathematics at the University of Calcutta and was influential in standardizing notation and conventions in the algebra of matrices and determinants.

== Life and work ==
Cullis was the son of Frederick John, a dock surveyor in Gloucester and Louisa (née Corbett) Cullis. One of his two sisters, Winifred C. Cullis, became a physiologist. He was educated at King Edward High School, Birmingham after which he joined Caius College, Cambridge. After being seventh wrangler in 1891 he went to Jena, Germany and received a doctorate under Carl Johannes Thomae with a thesis titled Die Bewegung Durchlöcherter Körper in einer Inkompressiblen Flüssigkeit. He became a lecturer at Hartley College and moved to the University of Calcutta in 1910 where he served as Hardinge Professor of Mathematics until his retirement in 1925.

Cullis published extensively in the Bulletin of the Calcutta Mathematical Society and among his contribution was the work demonstrating that the Moebius ring was a section of the cubic surface defined by:

y(x^{2}+y^{2}+z^{2}-a^{2})-2z(x^{2}+y^{2}+ax)=0

His most important work was Matrices and Determinoids (1913-1925) to be published in three volumes although only two volumes and a part of the third volume were finally published. He defined what is now called the Cullis-Radić determinant for rectangular matrices.

Cullis died in Gloucester and bequeathed £1000 to Gonville & Caius college to support needy students.
