= Uckington, Gloucestershire =

Village in Gloucestershire, England

Coordinates: 51.923°N 2.120°W

Uckington
- Village and civil parish
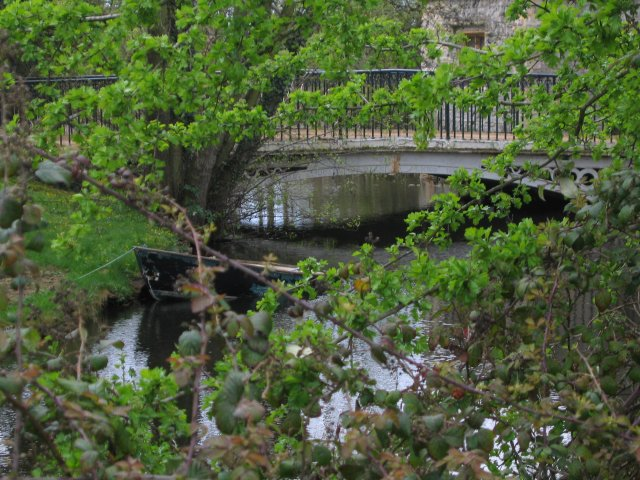
- Uckington Moat

- Location within Gloucestershire
- OS grid reference: SO917249
- Civil parish: Uckington
- District: Tewkesbury Borough
- Shire county: Gloucestershire
- Region: South West
- Country: England
- Sovereign state: United Kingdom
- Post town: Cheltenham
- Postcode district: GL51
- Dialling code: 01242
- Police: Gloucestershire
- Fire: Gloucestershire
- Ambulance: South Western
- UK Parliament: Tewkesbury

Uckington is a village in the Borough of Tewkesbury in Gloucestershire, England. It is directly west of Cheltenham.

The population of the parish taken at the 2011 census was 605.

Not having a church, Uckington was formerly a hamlet in the parish of Elmstone-Hardwicke but is now a civil parish in its own right. The two villages share a village hall.

Nearby villages include Elmstone-Hardwicke and Boddington.
