= Florence Buchanan =

British zoologist

Florence Buchanan (21 April 1867 – 13 March 1931) was a zoologist. She was awarded a London D.Sc. in 1902, was appointed as a Fellow of the University College London in 1904, and was awarded the American Association of Collegiate Alumnae's prize in 1910 for her research.

== Early years ==
Florence Buchanan was born on 21 April 1867 in the St. Marylebone parish in London.

== Education ==
Florence studied for a BSc in Zoology at the University College London, from 1886 to 1890, achieving a second class honours.

== Research ==
Buchanan's early research interests were in the development of respiratory organs in decapod Crustacea, as well as polychaete worms, which she researched at University College London (1889–1892), the Plymouth Marine Laboratory (1891), and the Royal Dublin Society (1893).

By 1894, Buchanan's primary research interests had changed to the electrical effects in muscle, which she researched at J. Burdon Sanderson's laboratory in Oxford (1894-1905), which then progressed into an interest in the heartbeat and form of the electrocardiogram, and transmission of reflex impulses in mammals, birds, and reptiles, which she researched at the Oxford University Museum laboratory (1904-1913).

Buchanan is thought to be the first woman to attend a meeting of The Physiological Society, and she was among the group of six first female members of the Society in 1915.

== Achievements ==
Buchanan was awarded a London D.Sc. in physiology in July 1902, for her research into electrical effects in muscle, as well as being appointed as a Fellow of the University College London in 1904, in order to continue her research in this area.

In 1910, Buchanan was awarded the American Association of Collegiate Alumnae's prize, for her original research into transmission of reflex impulses.

== Later years and death ==
Following the death of long-time collaborator J. Burdon Sanderson in 1905, Buchanan decided to continue their work into the heartbeat and form of the electrocardiogram, and transmission of reflex impulses herself, with occasional collaborative discussions being held with Charles Scott Sherrington.

Post 1913, shortly after being awarded the American Association of Collegiate Alumnae's prize, Buchanan's publication rate started to decline, up until her death on 13 March 1931.
