= Winifred Cullis =

British physiologist (1875-1956)

Winifred Clara Cullis CBE
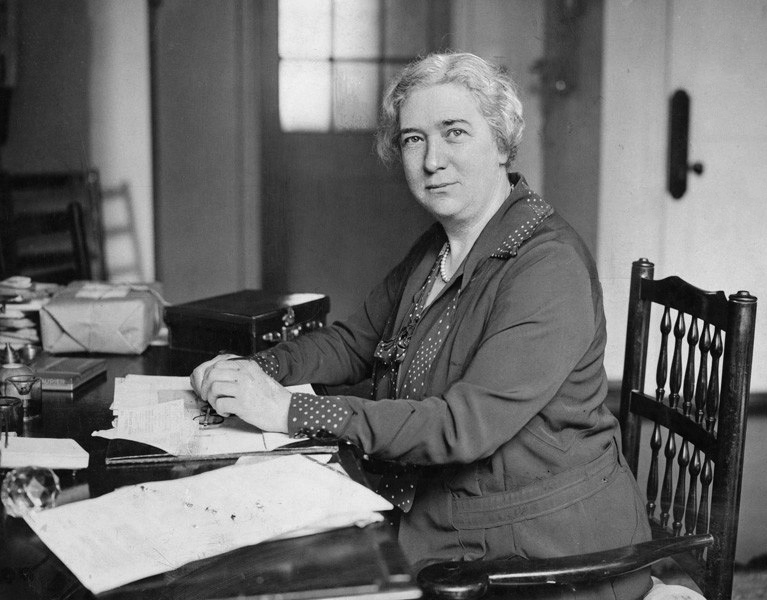
- Winifred Cullis in the 1930s
- Born: 2 June 1875; Gloucester, U.K.
- Died: 13 November 1956; London, U.K.
- Education: Newnham College; University of Cambridge; University of London
- Scientific career
- Fields: Physiology; Science education
- Workplaces: Royal College of Surgeons;Royal College of Physicians; London School of Medicine for Women
- Thesis: Experiments upon the isolated mammalian heart, especially with regard to the action of defibrinated blood upon it (1908)

Winifred Cullis CBE (2 June 1875 – 13 November 1956) was a physiologist and academic, and the first woman to hold a professorial chair at a medical school.

== Early life and education ==
Born in Gloucester, Winifred was the youngest daughter of the six children of Frederick John and Louisa (née Corbett) Cullis. Her brother Cuthbert Edmund Cullis became a mathematician. The family moved to Birmingham in 1880. She was initially educated at a middle school, the Summer Hill School, and at 16 transferred to the associated King Edward VI High School for Girls, Birmingham and took extra science classes at Mason College.

She entered Newnham College, Cambridge in 1896, financed by a Sidgwick scholarship, and achieved a second in both parts of the natural sciences tripos (1899 and 1900). While an undergraduate student she was supervised in the Physiological Laboratory by John Newport Langley. She was not awarded a degree since Cambridge did not award degrees to women at this time. (However, Cambridge University awarded her an MA in 1927). She was awarded DSc by London University in 1908 for Experiments upon the isolated mammalian heart, especially with regard to the action of defibrinated blood upon it.

She was described as having a generous spirit and had a gift for making persuasive and engaging speeches. Her values were as a feminist and intellectual with great personal integrity and loyalty. At school she had been good at acting, singing and tennis as well as academic study. In later life she enjoyed the arts and cross-stitch.

She died on 13 November 1956 at her home, Vincent House in Pembridge Square, London.

== Career ==
Cullis began her career at the Royal College of Surgeons and of the Royal College of Physicians in 1901 as an assistant to Thomas Gregor Brodie as well as working part-time in a school. Cullis then appointed as a demonstrator in physiology at the London School of Medicine for Women later in 1901. She was subsequently appointed as a co-lecturer with T. G. Brodie from 1903 and then as a part-time lecturer in 1908. Cullis collaborated with several others including William Dobinson Halliburton and Walter Ernest Dixon. In 1912 she obtained a full-time post as lecturer and head of department, with the title as university reader in physiology. In 1916 she spent a year on secondment at the University of Toronto as the acting professor of physiology. She finally became a professor of physiology at the University of London in 1919 and the named Sophia Jex-Blake chair of physiology in 1926. She was the second woman in the UK to be appointed to a chair at a British university-level institution. She retired as professor emeritus in 1941.

In 1915 Cullis was one of the first five women elected as members of the Physiological Society and served on the society's committee from 1918 to 1925. She also presided at the 1920 society meeting.

While working with T G Brodie, her physiological research focused on the mechanisms of secretion of urine and of gas exchanges in the heart and intestine. With time, her interests changed to considering healthy living in people such as through sports science and effects of fatigue on factory workers. She also became involved with science education both nationally and internationally, including the fostering of international goodwill and the emancipation of both sexes through education.

== Scientific publications ==
Cullis was author or co-author of at least 18 scientific publications as well as several books. She also gave a very large number of public talks.

- Winifred Cullis (1949) Your Body and the Way it Works. Illustrations by Horace J Knowles. George Allen and Unwin, London. 32pp
- Winifred Cullis and Muriel Bond (1935, revised edition 1950) The Body and its Health. Illustrations by Ian T Morison. Ivor Nicholson and Watson, London 215 pp.
- Winifred Cullis (1942) What British Women are doing in the War. The third lecture of the Helen Kenyon lectureship at Vassar College, delivered in two parts, April 30 and May 1, 1942. Poughkeepsie, N.Y. 32pp. Digitized 2010 HathiTrust Digital Library.
- Cullis, Winifred C (1942) Impact of War Upon British Home Life. Marriage and Family Living 4 10–11
- Cullis, WC and EM Scarborough (1932) The influence of temperature in the frog (I) On the circulation, and (2) on the circulatory effects of adrenaline and of sodium nitrite. Journal of Physiology 75 33–43
- Cullis, WC, Rendal, O and E Dahl (1927) Observations on the ethyl iodide method for the determination of heart output. Journal of Physiology 64 39–46
- Cullis, WC, Rendal, O and E Dahl (1926) The application of the ethyl iodide method to the determination of the circulation rate in women. Journal of Physiology 62 104–114
- Cullis, Winifred C (1924) Industrial psychology: some ways of increasing output of work. Journal of the National Institute of Industrial Psychology 2 125–128
- Cullis, WC, Oppenheimer, EM and M Ross-Johnson (1922) Temperature and other changes in women during the menstrual cycle. Lancet 2 594–596
- Cullis, WC and EE Hewer (1922) The pernicious vomiting of pregnancy Lancet 1 664
- Cullis, WC and EE Hewer (1920) The "ammonia coefficient" of pregnancy. Biochemical Journal 14 757–761
- Brodie, TG, Mackenzie, JJ, Cullis, WC and EM Tribe (1915) Some observations on the condition of the lungs during recovery from chest wounds. Lancet 2 912–913
- Cullis, WC and EM Tribe (1913) Distribution of nerves in the heart. Journal of Physiology 46 141–150
- Cullis, WC and WE Dixon (1911) Excitation and section of the auriculo-ventricular bundle. Journal of Physiology 42 156–178
- Brodie, TG, Cullis, WC and WD Halliburton (1910) The gaseous metabolism of the small intestine. Part II The gaseous exchanges during the absorption of Witte's peptone. Journal of Physiology 40 173–189
- Brodie, TG and WC Cullis, (1908) An apparatus for the perfusion of the isolated mammalian heart. Journal of Physiology 37 337–340
- Brodie, TG and WC Cullis (1908) The analysis of oxygen and carbonic acid contained in small volumes of saline solutions. Journal of Physiology 36 405–413
- Brodie, TG and WC Cullis (1906) On the secretion of urine. Journal of Physiology 34 224–249
- WC Cullis (1906) On secretion in the frog's kidney. Journal of Physiology 34 250–266

== Science outreach ==
She gave many talks and other presentations for science outreach. These included:

In 1919 she gave lectures to military personnel stationed in Gibraltar and Malta at the request of the Colonial Office.

Cullis spoke at the Women’s Engineering Society’s seventh Annual Conference in July 1929, alongside architect Edna Mosley and Helena Normanton, the first woman to practise as a barrister in England and second woman to be called to the Bar of England and Wales. Her speech was witty but ended on a serious note discussing how radium used in the treatment of cancer increased cures from 10% to 50%.

In 1931 she gave support to a public subscription for building a ward in the new Royal Free Hospital to be named in memory of Mary Scharlieb.

In the 1930s she toured the world extensively promoting higher education for women and also promoted adult education via radio shows.

During and after the Second World War she gave many lectures about Britain in wartime. In 1940–41 she gave these in China, Japan, Malaya, the Dutch East Indies, Australia, New Zealand, and the USA. She was based in New York in the USA from 1941 to 1943 as Director of the women's section of the British information services and moved to the Middle East in 1944–5 to lecture to the Royal Air Force.

She considered that biology and the applications of science to life should be part of everyone's knowledge and included in the school curriculum. As an example of her action in this area, she devised programmes for physical education and ballet teachers in schools run by the London County Council.

== Committee work, influence and honours ==
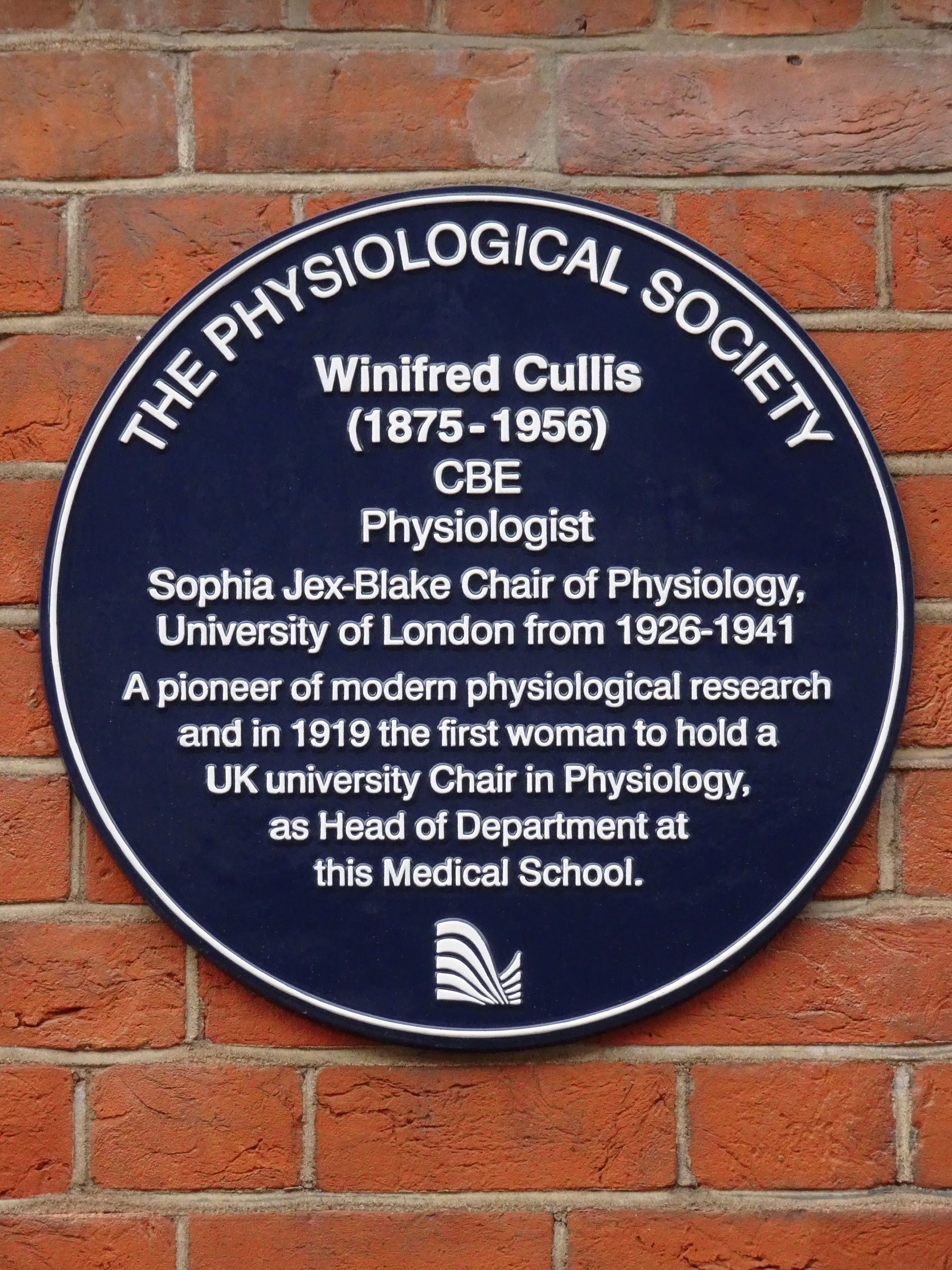
Winifred Cullis (1875-1956) CBE Physiologist - Physiological Society plaque

In 1919 she was appointed to the Order of the British Empire (OBE) and in 1929 was raised to the rank of Commander of the Most Excellent Order of the British Empire (CBE).

Cullis was awarded honorary degrees by Vassar College, USA (1919), Goucher College, USA (1931), and Birmingham University (1955).

She was president of the British Federation of University Women (1925–1929) and the International Federation of University Women (1929–1932). The International Federation of University Women has an award in her honour.

Cullis was a member of a large number of committees in the later part of her career. These included the clinical management committee of the Institute of Child Psychology, the council of the National Institute of Industrial Psychology and the Home Office committee on the two-shift system for women and young persons, the British Association for the Advancement of Science, the Trades Union Congress committee on scientific planning of industry, the Central Council of Recreative Physical Training, the King Edward VII Hospital Fund, the BBC Council for Adult Education, and the governing bodies of the Royal Academy of Dancing and Chelsea Polytechnic. She was chairman of the British Film Institute's educational panel, and from 1951 until her death, deputy chair of the English-Speaking Union. She was also a director of the Time and Tide magazine.
