= Grade II* listed buildings in Tewkesbury (borough) =

There are over 20,000 Grade II* listed buildings in England. This page is a list of these buildings in the district of Tewkesbury in Gloucestershire.

== Tewkesbury ==
Name	Location	Type	Completed (Note: The date given is the date used by Historic England as significant for the initial building or that of an important part in the structure's description.)	Date designated	Grid ref. (Note: The grid reference is based on the British national grid reference system, sometimes known as OSGB36, used by the Ordnance Survey.) Geo-coordinates	Entry number (Note: The "List Entry Number" is a unique number assigned to each listed building and scheduled monument by Historic England.)	Image
Church of St Margaret of Antioch	Alderton, Tewkesbury	Church	Perpendicular	4 July 1960	SP0020533178; 51°59′49″N 1°59′54″W	1091731	Church of St Margaret of Antioch More images
Dixton Manor	Dixton, Alderton	Manor House	16th century	4 July 1960	SO9845730485; 51°58′22″N 2°01′26″W	1091732	Dixton Manor More images
Church of St Nicholas	Ashchurch Village, Ashchurch Rural	Anglican Church	12th century	4 July 1960	SO9275833414; 51°59′57″N 2°06′25″W	1153103	Church of St Nicholas More images
Dovecote circa 75 Metres South East of Manor Farm	Fiddington, Ashchurch Rural	Dovecote	1637	25 February 1987	SO9207630897; 51°58′35″N 2°07′00″W	1091923	Upload Photo
Manor Farm	Fiddington, Ashchurch Rural	Farmhouse	Late C18-early 19th century	25 February 1987	SO9205330957; 51°58′37″N 2°07′02″W	1091922	Upload Photo
The Manor	Aston on Carrant, Ashchurch Rural	House	1614	4 July 1960	SO9448934542; 52°00′33″N 2°04′54″W	1340054	The Manor
Ashleworth Manor	White End, Ashleworth	Jettied House	c.1460 or later	10 January 1955	SO8189325734; 51°55′47″N 2°15′53″W	1091361	Ashleworth Manor More images
Foscombe	Ashleworth	Country House	c. 1860	26 November 1986	SO8009126722; 51°56′19″N 2°17′28″W	1340298	Foscombe More images
Tithe Barn, Ashleworth Court	Ashleworth	Cow House	19th century	10 January 1955	SO8178825205; 51°55′30″N 2°15′58″W	1171121	Tithe Barn, Ashleworth Court More images
Dovecote 3m north of Bridge House	Bentham, Badgeworth	Dovecote	17th century	15 August 1973	SO9117716717; 51°50′56″N 2°07′46″W	1304753	Dovecote 3m north of Bridge House More images
Cleeve Hall	Bishop's Cleeve	Bishops Palace	c. 1250	4 July 1960	SO9568827627; 51°56′50″N 2°03′51″W	1303966	Cleeve Hall More images
Brockworth Court	Brockworth	House	18th century	10 January 1955	SO8912117022; 51°51′06″N 2°09′34″W	1091764	Brockworth Court More images
Tithe Barn about 8m north-east of Brockworth Court	Brockworth	Barn	19th century	10 January 1955	SO8913917069; 51°51′08″N 2°09′33″W	1152564	Tithe Barn about 8m north-east of Brockworth Court
Buckland Manor Hotel	Buckland Village, Buckland	Country House	17th century	4 July 1960	SP0814135964; 52°01′19″N 1°52′58″W	1091842	Buckland Manor Hotel More images
Unidentified Monuments in the Churchyard, about 1.5m north of West End of North Aisle, Church of St Michael	Buckland Village, Buckland	Chest Tomb	15th century	7 September 1987	SP0816736015; 52°01′21″N 1°52′57″W	1091843	Upload Photo
Chaceley Hall	Chaceley	Kitchen	Late 19th century	10 January 1955	SO8421430577; 51°58′24″N 2°13′52″W	1304298	Chaceley Hall More images
Church of St John the Baptist	Chaceley Village, Chaceley	Anglican Church	early-mid 19th century	10 January 1955	SO8551130670; 51°58′28″N 2°12′44″W	1091455	Church of St John the Baptist More images
Grain House Farmhouse	Chaceley Village, Chaceley	Farmhouse	18th century	12 August 1985	SO8545630730; 51°58′29″N 2°12′47″W	1153559	Upload Photo
Caledonia Manor House	Churchdown	House	late C17-C18	29 October 1986	SO8840519898; 51°52′39″N 2°10′11″W	1305066	Upload Photo
Wightfield Manor	Deerhurst	Farmhouse	1987	4 July 1960	SO8694228724; 51°57′25″N 2°11′29″W	1088690	Wightfield Manor
Church of St Mary and Corpus Christi	Down Hatherley Village, Down Hatherley	Anglican Church	c. 1860	10 January 1955	SO8678722484; 51°54′03″N 2°11′36″W	1153578	Church of St Mary and Corpus Christi More images
Church of St Catherine	Wormington Village, Dumbleton	Church	Anglo-Saxon	4 July 1960	SP0389136431; 52°01′35″N 1°56′41″W	1091676	Church of St Catherine More images
Church of St Mary	Little Washbourne, Dumbleton	Former Church	12th century	4 July 1960	SO9891433437; 51°59′58″N 2°01′02″W	1091716	Church of St Mary More images
Dumbleton Hall	Dumbleton Village, Dumbleton	Country House	c. 1830	28 August 1987	SP0132635626; 52°01′09″N 1°58′56″W	1091709	Dumbleton Hall More images
Church of St Mary the Virgin	Forthampton Village, Forthampton	Anglican Church	1788	10 January 1955	SO8588432573; 51°59′29″N 2°12′25″W	1340277	Church of St Mary the Virgin More images
Forthampton Court	Forthampton	Country House	C12-mid 16th century	12 August 1985	SO8701231777; 51°59′03″N 2°11′26″W	1153626	Forthampton Court More images
Beach Hall (the Summer House) circa 5m south of Witcombe Park	Witcombe Park, Great Witcombe	Walled Garden	1697	4 July 1960	SO9115214434; 51°49′42″N 2°07′47″W	1304582	Upload Photo
Gretton Farmhouse	Gretton	Farmhouse	16th century	4 July 1960	SP0097030291; 51°58′16″N 1°59′14″W	1305102	Upload Photo
Hasfield Court	Hasfield	Country House	Late 17th century	12 August 1985	SO8251627470; 51°56′44″N 2°15′21″W	1091444	Hasfield Court More images
Church of St Edward	Hawling Village, Hawling	Parish Church	Early 13th century	4 July 1960	SP0629322939; 51°54′18″N 1°54′36″W	1091850	Church of St Edward More images
Church of St Oswald's Tower	Lassington, Highnam	Tower	Late 11th century	10 January 1955	SO7960321172; 51°53′19″N 2°17′52″W	1091372	Church of St Oswald's Tower More images
Church of St Giles	Maisemore	Parish Church	15th century	10 January 1955	SO8138021655; 51°53′35″N 2°16′19″W	1171533	Church of St Giles More images
Maisemore Court, Old Court, New Court	Maisemore	Farmhouse	Early 17th century	26 November 1986	SO8139321582; 51°53′33″N 2°16′18″W	1091377	Upload Photo
Church of St Peter	Minsterworth	Parish Church	1869-70	26 November 1986	SO7731417005; 51°51′04″N 2°19′51″W	1340317	Church of St Peter More images
Church of St Mary	Prior's Norton, Norton	Anglican Church	1875-76	10 January 1955	SO8655424379; 51°55′04″N 2°11′49″W	1340308	Church of St Mary More images
Church of St Martin de Tours	Woolstone, Oxenton	Church	14th century	4 December 1987	SO9611230244; 51°58′14″N 2°03′29″W	1091692	Church of St Martin de Tours More images
Chapel of Ease (St Michael)	Stanley Pontlarge, Prescott	Church	12th century	4 July 1960	SO9992430202; 51°58′13″N 2°00′09″W	1340193	Chapel of Ease (St Michael) More images
The Cottage	Stanley Pontlarge, Prescott	House	Late C15-early 16th century	4 July 1960	SO9989830214; 51°58′13″N 2°00′10″W	1091663	Upload Photo
Church of St Lawrence	Sandhurst Village, Sandhurst	Anglican Church	1858	10 January 1955	SO8279423332; 51°54′30″N 2°15′05″W	1154346	Church of St Lawrence More images
Gate Piers in front of Wallsworth Hall	Sandhurst	Gate Pier	18th century	12 August 1985	SO8417122971; 51°54′18″N 2°13′53″W	1091414	Gate Piers in front of Wallsworth Hall
Wallsworth Hall	Sandhurst	Country House	1753	12 August 1985	SO8411523003; 51°54′19″N 2°13′56″W	1340310	Wallsworth Hall More images
Church of St Paul	Shurdington	Church	1655	4 July 1960	SO9211118825; 51°52′05″N 2°06′58″W	1091720	Church of St Paul More images
Snowshill Manor	Snowshill Village, Snowshill	Country House	17th century	4 July 1960	SP0967533841; 52°00′11″N 1°51′38″W	1340081	Snowshill Manor More images
Church of the Ascension	Southam	Church	12th century	4 December 1987	SO9698125557; 51°55′43″N 2°02′43″W	1303115	Church of the Ascension More images
Manor Farmhouse	Southam	Farmhouse	1631	4 July 1960	SO9677325660; 51°55′46″N 2°02′54″W	1091667	Upload Photo
Southam Tithe Barn and Shelter Shed	Southam	Barn	C20	4 July 1960	SO9697625598; 51°55′44″N 2°02′43″W	1091668	Southam Tithe Barn and Shelter Shed More images
The De La Bere Hotel	Southam	Country House	c. 1500	4 July 1960	SO9722925350; 51°55′36″N 2°02′30″W	1155737	The De La Bere Hotel More images
Old Manor Farmhouse	Stanton	Farmhouse	Late 16th century	4 July 1960	SP0682434241; 52°00′24″N 1°54′07″W	1154068	Upload Photo
Stables, Wormington Grange	Stanton	Dwelling	Late 19th century	4 July 1960	SP0461934646; 52°00′37″N 1°56′03″W	1091824	Upload Photo
The Manor and Warne Cottage	Stanton	House	Early 16th century	4 July 1960	SP0677034191; 52°00′22″N 1°54′10″W	1091838	The Manor and Warne Cottage More images
Wormington Grange	Stanton	Country House	1770s	4 July 1960	SP0467534570; 52°00′34″N 1°56′00″W	1340084	Wormington Grange More images
Church of St Peter	Stanway	Church	1797	4 July 1960	SP0607432364; 51°59′23″N 1°54′47″W	1154342	Church of St Peter More images
Pyramid in Grounds of Stanway House, about 300m to the East	Stanway Village, Stanway	Garden Building	1750	7 September 1987	SP0644632422; 51°59′25″N 1°54′27″W	1303832	Pyramid in Grounds of Stanway House, about 300m to the East More images
Stanway War Memorial	Stanway	War memorial	1920	7 September 1987	SP0600132200; 51°59′16″N 1°54′45″W	1154209	Stanway War Memorial More images
Papermill Farmhouse	Stanway	Farmhouse	13th century	7 September 1987	SP0714732375; 51°59′23″N 1°53′50″W	1091800	Upload Photo
Church of St Catherine	Staverton	church	late C20	4 July 1960	SO8900323598; 51°54′39″N 2°09′41″W	1304748	Church of St Catherine More images
Unidentified Monument in the Churchyard of the Church of St John the Baptist, circa 2.5m south of the Porch	Tredington, Stoke Orchard	Chest Tomb	late C17-early 18th century	25 February 1987	SO9049729481; 51°57′49″N 2°08′23″W	1091884	Upload Photo
Wadfield House and Side Walls to Forecourt	Sudeley	House	c. 1705	4 July 1960	SP0255826394; 51°56′10″N 1°57′51″W	1091780	Upload Photo
Church of St Margaret	Alstone Village, Teddington	Church	Late 12th century	4 July 1960	SO9826232459; 51°59′26″N 2°01′36″W	1340159	Church of St Margaret More images
Manor Farmhouse	Alstone Village, Teddington	Farmhouse	C20	4 December 1987	SO9827132511; 51°59′28″N 2°01′36″W	1091671	Upload Photo
Abbey Mill	River Avon, Tewkesbury	Banqueting House	1952	4 March 1952	SO8891732544; 51°59′28″N 2°09′46″W	1201285	Abbey Mill More images
Avonside	Tewkesbury	Row House	Mid 18th century	4 March 1952	SO8939033121; 51°59′47″N 2°09′21″W	1201256	Avonside More images
Bell Hotel	Tewkesbury	Inn	1696	4 March 1952	SO8898632499; 51°59′27″N 2°09′43″W	1201210	Bell Hotel More images
Berkeley Arms and Outbuilding	Tewkesbury	Hotel	C20	4 March 1952	SO8926832631; 51°59′31″N 2°09′28″W	1201203	Berkeley Arms and Outbuilding More images
Black Bear Inn	Tewkesbury	Steps	Early 16th century	4 March 1952	SO8940733177; 51°59′49″N 2°09′21″W	1207382	Black Bear Inn More images
Churchyard Gates	Abbey Precincts, Tewkesbury	Gate	1750	4 March 1952	SO8900832486; 51°59′27″N 2°09′41″W	1206025	Churchyard Gates More images
Clarence House	Tewkesbury	Cruck House	Early 16th century	4 March 1952	SO8931032762; 51°59′36″N 2°09′26″W	1052276	Clarence House More images
Craik House	Tewkesbury	Jettied House	LATE 15th century or early 16th century	4 March 1952	SO8915832589; 51°59′30″N 2°09′34″W	1205867	Craik House More images
Cross House	Tewkesbury	Apartment	1994	4 March 1952	SO8926432698; 51°59′33″N 2°09′28″W	1201228	Cross House More images
Golden Key House	Tewkesbury	Jettied House	16th century	4 March 1952	SO8927532760; 51°59′35″N 2°09′27″W	1206326	Golden Key House More images
Jessop House Hotel	Tewkesbury	Row House	Early 18th century	4 March 1952	SO8904732543; 51°59′28″N 2°09′39″W	1205712	Jessop House Hotel More images
King John's Bridge	Tewkesbury	Steps	c. 1190	4 March 1952	SO8937133231; 51°59′51″N 2°09′22″W	1201287	King John's Bridge More images
King John's Castle	The Mythe, Tewkesbury	House	Mid 16th century	4 March 1952	SO8890634119; 52°00′19″N 2°09′47″W	1201162	King John's Castle More images
Malthouse to rear of No 23, Barton Street	Tewkesbury	Malt House	17th century	4 March 1952	SO8941532738; 51°59′35″N 2°09′20″W	1281018	Upload Photo
Mythe Bridge	The Mythe, Tewkesbury	Road Bridge	1825	4 March 1952	SO8887333737; 52°00′07″N 2°09′49″W	1282810	Mythe Bridge More images
Newton House	Tewkesbury	Open Hall House	late 14th century or 15th century	4 March 1952	SO8917532569; 51°59′29″N 2°09′33″W	1280642	Newton House More images
Nottingham Arms	Tewkesbury	Jettied House	Early 16th century	4 March 1952	SO8931932823; 51°59′38″N 2°09′25″W	1201269	Nottingham Arms More images
Old Baptist Chapel	Tewkesbury	House	1720	4 March 1952	SO8902832562; 51°59′29″N 2°09′40″W	1207425	Old Baptist Chapel More images
Royal Hop Pole Hotel	Tewkesbury	Jettied House	Late 15th century	4 March 1952	SO8920532630; 51°59′31″N 2°09′31″W	1205936	Royal Hop Pole Hotel More images
Tewkesbury Museum and attached Railings	Tewkesbury	Jettied House	early to mid 17th century	4 March 1952	SO8943432702; 51°59′34″N 2°09′19″W	1204935	Tewkesbury Museum and attached Railings More images
12 High Street (The Old Fleece)	Tewkesbury	Jettied House	Early 17th century	4 March 1952	SO8929032798; 51°59′37″N 2°09′27″W	1201243	12 High Street (The Old Fleece) More images
Town Hall	Tewkesbury	Town Hall	1788	4 March 1952	SO8929232835; 51°59′38″N 2°09′27″W	1206399	Town Hall More images
Tudor Hotel	Tewkesbury	House	Early 17th century	4 March 1952	SO8936533048; 51°59′45″N 2°09′23″W	1280099	Tudor Hotel More images
Young Mens Christian Association	Tewkesbury	Row House	17th century or earlier	4 March 1952	SO8922032641; 51°59′32″N 2°09′30″W	1201226	Young Mens Christian Association More images
No 9, Church Street including Yard Wall	Tewkesbury	Jettied House	14th century or early 15th century	4 March 1952	SO8925632635; 51°59′31″N 2°09′28″W	1280735	No 9, Church Street including Yard Wall More images
10, Church Street	Tewkesbury	House	mid/late 18th century	4 March 1952	SO8925332631; 51°59′31″N 2°09′29″W	1282789	10, Church Street More images
15 and 16, Church Street	Tewkesbury	Jettied House	Late 15th century	4 March 1952	SO8922932613; 51°59′31″N 2°09′30″W	1280681	15 and 16, Church Street More images
No 77, Church St including Gate Piers	Tewkesbury	Row House	Early 18th century	4 March 1952	SO8913532573; 51°59′29″N 2°09′35″W	1280534	No 77, Church St including Gate Piers More images
88 and 88a, Church Street	Tewkesbury	House	16th century	4 March 1952	SO8917732603; 51°59′30″N 2°09′33″W	1205905	88 and 88a, Church Street More images
89 and 90, Church Street	Tewkesbury	Jettied House	15th century or early 16th century	4 March 1952	SO8918032606; 51°59′30″N 2°09′32″W	1201225	89 and 90, Church Street More images
91 and 92, Church Street	Tewkesbury	Jettied House	1564	4 March 1952	SO8919232615; 51°59′31″N 2°09′32″W	1205919	91 and 92, Church Street More images
100 Church Street	Tewkesbury	Jettied House	1664	4 March 1952	SO8924032661; 51°59′32″N 2°09′29″W	1280450	100 Church Street More images
1, High Street	Tewkesbury	Row House	Early 18th century	4 March 1952	SO8926632710; 51°59′34″N 2°09′28″W	1201239	1, High Street More images
2, High Street	Tewkesbury	Row House	Early 18th century	4 March 1952	SO8926532720; 51°59′34″N 2°09′28″W	1280304	2, High Street More images
15, High Street	Tewkesbury	House	Late 16th century	4 March 1952	SO8929232812; 51°59′37″N 2°09′27″W	1206372	15, High Street More images
39 and 40 High Street	Tewkesbury	Row House	c. 1730	4 March 1952	SO8933332961; 51°59′42″N 2°09′24″W	1282770	39 and 40 High Street More images
132, High Street	Tewkesbury	Jettied House	Early 16th century	4 March 1952	SO8932032803; 51°59′37″N 2°09′25″W	1282779	132, High Street More images
135 High Street	Tewkesbury	Jettied House	16th century	4 March 1952	SO8930932789; 51°59′36″N 2°09′26″W	1372300	135 High Street More images
137 High Street	Tewkesbury	Row House	15th century	4 March 1952	SO8930732780; 51°59′36″N 2°09′26″W	1052263	137 High Street
154, High Street	Tewkesbury	Jettied House	Late 15th century	4 March 1952	SO8928632702; 51°59′34″N 2°09′27″W	1201274	154, High Street More images
155, High Street	Tewkesbury	Jettied House	late 15th century or early 16th century	4 March 1952	SO8928532698; 51°59′33″N 2°09′27″W	1282742	155, High Street More images
22 Barton Street	Tewkesbury	Jettied House	16th century	4 March 1952	SO8940932718; 51°59′34″N 2°09′20″W	1204795	22 Barton Street More images
81 and 82, Barton Street	Tewkesbury	Cruck House	14th century	4 March 1952	SO8932932678; 51°59′33″N 2°09′25″W	1205058	Upload Photo
1 and 2, Mill Bank	Tewkesbury	Jettied House	late 15th century or early 16th century	4 March 1952	SO8894632556; 51°59′29″N 2°09′45″W	1201278	1 and 2, Mill Bank More images
Toddington House	Toddington	House	Early 17th century	4 July 1960	SP0345633079; 51°59′46″N 1°57′04″W	1303593	Toddington House More images
Church of St Mary Magdalene	Twyning Village, Twyning	Anglican Church	12th century	4 July 1960	SO8937336084; 52°01′23″N 2°09′23″W	1303825	Church of St Mary Magdalene More images
Church of St Mary Magdalene	Elmstone Hardwicke, Uckington	Church	12th century	4 July 1960	SO9203226065; 51°55′59″N 2°07′02″W	1340067	Church of St Mary Magdalene More images
Abbey Old House	Winchcombe	Abbey	Founded 972	4 July 1960	SP0234028362; 51°57′13″N 1°58′02″W	1305465	Upload Photo
Corndean Hall	Winchcombe	Villa	Early 19th century	31 October 1984	SP0160426192; 51°56′03″N 1°58′41″W	1171711	Corndean Hall
The Follies	Winchcombe	Row House	17th century	4 July 1960	SP0266628524; 51°57′19″N 1°57′45″W	1172038	Upload Photo
Tithe Barn 60 Metres South of Postlip Hall	Postlip, Winchcombe	Assembly Hall	1960	4 July 1960	SO9989326784; 51°56′22″N 2°00′11″W	1091478	Tithe Barn 60 Metres South of Postlip Hall
Ye Old Corner Cupboard	Winchcombe	Inn (formerly farmhouse)	16th century	4 July 1960	SP0203228138; 51°57′06″N 1°58′19″W	1091517	Ye Old Corner Cupboard More images
The Manor Farmhouse (two occupations)	Woodmancote	Farmhouse	C16-early 17th century	4 July 1960	SO9748227255; 51°56′38″N 2°02′17″W	1091637	Upload Photo
