= Grade I listed buildings in Tewkesbury (borough) =

Gloucestershire shown in England

There are over 9,000 Grade I listed buildings in England. This page is a list of these buildings in the district of Tewkesbury in Gloucestershire.

== Tewkesbury ==
Name	Location	Type	Completed (Note: The date given is the date used by Historic England as significant for the initial building or that of an important part in the structure's description.)	Date designated	Grid ref. (Note: Sometimes known as OSGB36, the grid reference is based on the British national grid reference system used by the Ordnance Survey.) Geo-coordinates	Entry number (Note: The "List Entry Number" is a unique number assigned to each listed building and scheduled monument by Historic England.)	Image
Ashleworth Court	Ashleworth	House	c. 1460	10 January 1955	SO8186525218; 51°55′31″N 2°15′54″W	1091401	Ashleworth Court More images
Church of St Andrew and St Bartholomew	Ashleworth	Church	12th century	10 January 1955	SO8185025186; 51°55′30″N 2°15′55″W	1340301	Church of St Andrew and St Bartholomew More images
Church of the Holy Trinity	Badgeworth	Church	1645	4 July 1960	SO9015019231; 51°52′18″N 2°08′40″W	1340103	Church of the Holy Trinity More images
Church of St Michael and All Angels	Bishop's Cleeve	Church	1160-1190	4 July 1960	SO9607827736; 51°56′53″N 2°03′30″W	1091736	Church of St Michael and All Angels More images
Church of St Mary Magdalene	Boddington	Church	12th century	4 July 1960	SO8944225193; 51°55′31″N 2°09′18″W	1172312	Church of St Mary Magdalene More images
Church of St George	Brockworth	Church	12th century	10 January 1955	SO8908817031; 51°51′06″N 2°09′35″W	1091767	Church of St George More images
Church of St Michael	Buckland	Church	17th century	4 July 1960	SP0817336007; 52°01′21″N 1°52′56″W	1340093	Church of St Michael More images
Buckland Rectory	Buckland	House	c. 1480	4 July 1960	SP0799736192; 52°01′27″N 1°53′06″W	1091840	Buckland Rectory More images
Church of St Bartholomew	Churchdown	Church	12th century	10 January 1955	SO8823819101; 51°52′13″N 2°10′20″W	1305148	Church of St Bartholomew More images
Odda's Chapel	Deerhurst	House	Early 17th century	4 July 1960	SO8691629850; 51°58′01″N 2°11′31″W	1304997	Odda's Chapel More images
The Church of St Mary	Deerhurst	Church	1547	4 July 1960	SO8704729961; 51°58′05″N 2°11′24″W	1151998	The Church of St Mary More images
Priory Farmhouse	Deerhurst	Farmhouse	Late 16th century	4 July 1960	SO8706029943; 51°58′04″N 2°11′23″W	1088700	Priory Farmhouse More images
Church of St Mary	Great Washbourne	Church	Early 12th century	4 July 1960	SO9867634446; 52°00′30″N 2°01′15″W	1154943	Church of St Mary More images
Church of St Peter	Dumbleton	Church	1862	4 July 1960	SP0174535770; 52°01′13″N 1°58′34″W	1154563	Church of St Peter More images
Church of St Mary	Great Witcombe	Church	Mid 18th century	4 July 1960	SO9105514796; 51°49′54″N 2°07′52″W	1091745	Church of St Mary More images
Church of St Mary	Hasfield	Church	1719	10 January 1955	SO8261627556; 51°56′46″N 2°15′16″W	1091440	Church of St Mary More images
Great House	Hasfield	House	16th century	12 August 1985	SO8314627815; 51°56′55″N 2°14′48″W	1340306	Great House More images
Church of the Holy Innocents	Highnam	Church	1849-51	10 January 1955	SO7964119548; 51°52′27″N 2°17′50″W	1340330	Church of the Holy Innocents More images
Highnam Court	Higham	House	1658	10 January 1955	SO7935419329; 51°52′20″N 2°18′05″W	1340325	Highnam Court More images
Church of St Catherine	Leigh	Church	13th century	4 July 1960	SO8658125743; 51°55′48″N 2°11′48″W	1304831	Church of St Catherine More images
Church of St John the Baptist	Oxenton	Church	13th century	4 July 1960	SO9584431473; 51°58′54″N 2°03′43″W	1303393	Church of St John the Baptist More images
Church of St Michael and All Angels	Stanton	Church	12th century	4 July 1960	SP0688934313; 52°00′26″N 1°54′04″W	1091828	Church of St Michael and All Angels More images
Hailes Church	Hailes, Stanway	Church	12th century	4 July 1960	SP0504330147; 51°58′11″N 1°55′41″W	1154315	Hailes Church More images
Church of St George	Didbrook, Stanway	Church	13th century	4 July 1960	SP0548531404; 51°58′52″N 1°55′18″W	1091804	Church of St George More images
Hailes Abbey	Hailes, Stanway	Wall	Mid 13th century	4 July 1960	SP0504429999; 51°58′06″N 1°55′41″W	1154262	Hailes Abbey More images
Stanway House	Stanway	House	Late 16th century	4 July 1960	SP0612832394; 51°59′24″N 1°54′44″W	1154381	Stanway House More images
Gatehouse, Stanway House	Stanway	Gatehouse	c. 1630	4 June 1970	SP0611332361; 51°59′23″N 1°54′45″W	1091812	Gatehouse, Stanway House More images
Wall and Gates to Entrance Courtyard, Stanway House	Stanway	Gate	c. 1630	7 September 1987	SP0610932396; 51°59′24″N 1°54′45″W	1303822	Upload Photo
Tithe barn, Stanway House	Stanway	Barn	c. 1370	4 July 1960	SP0603732401; 51°59′24″N 1°54′49″W	1091814	Tithe barn, Stanway House More images
Chapel of St James the Great	Stoke Orchard	Church	c. 1170	4 July 1960	SO9177328201; 51°57′08″N 2°07′16″W	1091878	Chapel of St James the Great More images
Church of St John the Baptist	Tredington, Stoke Orchard	Church	12th century	4 July 1960	SO9049829492; 51°57′50″N 2°08′23″W	1304016	Church of St John the Baptist More images
Sudeley Castle	Sudeley	Castle	Mid 15th century	4 July 1960	SP0309827667; 51°56′51″N 1°57′23″W	1154791	Sudeley Castle More images
Church of St Mary	Sudeley	Church	c. 1460	4 July 1960	SP0317927665; 51°56′51″N 1°57′19″W	1340136	Church of St Mary More images
Sudeley Castle Tithe Barn	Sudeley	Barn	2nd half of 15th century	4 July 1960	SP0304927774; 51°56′54″N 1°57′25″W	1340099	Sudeley Castle Tithe Barn More images
Church of St Nicholas	Teddington	Church	12th century	4 July 1960	SO9643332964; 51°59′42″N 2°03′12″W	1340161	Church of St Nicholas More images
Abbey Church of St Mary	Tewkesbury	Abbey	Founded	4 March 1952	SO8906732445; 51°59′25″N 2°09′38″W	1201159	Abbey Church of St Mary More images
Abbey Gatehouse	Tewkesbury	Gatehouse	LATE 15th century OR EARLY 16th century	4 March 1952	SO8897232381; 51°59′23″N 2°09′43″W	1201161	Abbey Gatehouse More images
Abbey House	Tewkesbury	Guest House	Medieval	4 March 1952	SO8900332397; 51°59′24″N 2°09′42″W	1282807	Abbey House More images
Abbey Lawn Cottages	Tewkesbury	House	15th/16th centuries	4 March 1952	SO8906832530; 51°59′28″N 2°09′38″W	1201209	Abbey Lawn Cottages More images
Abbey Lawn Cottages	Tewkesbury	House	15th/16th centuries	4 March 1952	SO8910032540; 51°59′28″N 2°09′37″W	1201208	Abbey Lawn Cottages More images
Royal British Legion Club	Tewkesbury	Timber Framed Building	Late 15th century	4 March 1952	SO8904532516; 51°59′28″N 2°09′39″W	1282793	Royal British Legion Club More images
40 Church Street	Tewkesbury	House	15th/16th centuries	4 March 1952	SO8908732536; 51°59′28″N 2°09′37″W	1205593	40 Church Street More images
Church of St Michael	Tirley	Church	1894	10 January 1955	SO8401528556; 51°57′19″N 2°14′02″W	1091384	Church of St Michael More images
Church of St Andrew	Toddington	Church	1873-1879	4 July 1960	SP0350133074; 51°59′46″N 1°57′02″W	1154923	Church of St Andrew More images
Toddington Manor	Toddington	House	1819-1835	4 July 1960	SP0363333325; 51°59′54″N 1°56′55″W	1340101	Toddington Manor More images
Church of St Peter	Winchcombe	Anglican Church	c1458 TO 1468	4 July 1960	SP0230128228; 51°57′09″N 1°58′05″W	1091545	Church of St Peter More images
Postlip Hall	Postlip, Winchcombe	House	1960	4 July 1960	SO9986726855; 51°56′25″N 2°00′12″W	1172261	Postlip Hall More images
St James Chapel about 25m north of Postlip Hall	Postlip, Winchcombe	Church	Norman	4 July 1960	SO9984126900; 51°56′26″N 2°00′13″W	1305213	Upload Photo

== See also ==
- Grade II* listed buildings in Tewkesbury (borough)
