= Tewkesbury Rural District =

Former local government area in the UK

Coordinates: 51.988°N 2.127°W

Tewkesbury
- Area
  - 1911: 28,366 acres (114.79 km^{2})
  - 1931: 28,482 acres (115.26 km^{2})
- Population
  - 1901: 4,986
  - 1931: 4,268
- History
  - Created: 1894
  - Abolished: 1935
  - Succeeded by: Cheltenham Rural District, Gloucester Rural District
- Status: Rural district
  - HQ: Tewkesbury

Tewkesbury Rural District was from 1894 to 1935 a rural district in the southwestern part of the Midlands in England. It had the unusual feature of including territory from the two neighbouring administrative counties of Gloucestershire and Worcestershire until boundary changes in 1933 placed the entire district in Gloucestershire.

== Formation ==
The rural district was formed by the Local Government Act 1894 as successor to the Tewkesbury Rural Sanitary District. A directly elected rural district council (RDC) replaced the rural sanitary authority, which consisted of the poor law guardians for the area. The district did not include the town of Tewkesbury which was a separate municipal borough.

== Parishes ==
The district comprised the following civil parishes:

Parish	County
Ashchurch	Gloucestershire
Boddington	Gloucestershire
Bredon	Worcestershire. Transferred to Pershore Rural District 1933.
Bredon's Norton	Worcestershire. Transferred to Pershore Rural District 1933.
Chaceley	Worcestershire until 1931, Gloucestershire thereafter.
Conderton	Worcestershire. Transferred to Evesham Rural District 1933.
Deerhurst	Gloucestershire
Elmstone Hardwicke	Gloucestershire
Forthampton	Gloucestershire
Kemerton	Gloucestershire until 1931, Worcestershire thereafter. Transferred to Evesham Rural District 1933.
Leigh	Gloucestershire
Overbury	Worcestershire. Transferred to Evesham Rural District 1933.
Oxenton	Gloucestershire
Pendock	Worcestershire. Transferred to Upton-upon-Severn Rural District 1933.
Stoke Orchard	Gloucestershire
Teddington	Worcestershire until 1931, Gloucestershire thereafter.
Tirley	Gloucestershire
Tredington	Gloucestershire
Twyning	Gloucestershire
Walton Cardiff	Gloucestershire
Woolstone	Gloucestershire

== Abolition ==
The district was abolished in 1935, and its area was redistributed. Most (21,713 acres (87.87 km^{2})) passed to Cheltenham Rural District; four parishes (Chaceley, Forthampton, Hasfield and Tirley) were transferred to Gloucester Rural District, while 182 acres (0.74 km^{2}) was included within the municipal borough of Tewkesbury.
