= List of public art in Gloucestershire =

This is a list of public art in the Gloucestershire county of England. This list applies only to works of public art on permanent display in an outdoor public space. For example, this does not include artworks in museums.

== Cheltenham ==
Image	Title / subject	Location and coordinates	Date	Artist / designer	Type	Material	Dimensions	Designation	Owner / administrator	Notes
More images	Boer War memorial	Promenade, Cheltenham 51.899582°N 2.076973°W	1907	RL Boulton and Sons of Cheltenham	Statue on pedestal	Bronze and stone		Grade II listed	Cheltenham Borough Council	
More images	Edward Wilson	Promenade, Cheltenham 51.898594°N 2.078196°W	1914	Lady Kathleen Scott	Statue on pedestal	Bronze and stone		Grade II listed	Cheltenham Borough Council	Wilson was a member of the ill-fated mission Terra Nova Expedition with Scott.
More images	War Memorial	Promenade, Cheltenham	1921	RL Boulton and Sons of Cheltenham	Obelisk on pedestal	Portland stone		Grade II listed		
More images	The Minotaur and the Hare	Promenade, Cheltenham 51.900036°N 2.076309°W	1995	Sophie Ryder	Sculpture group	Bronze			Cheltenham Borough Council	
More images	Gustav Holst	Imperial Gardens, Cheltenham 51.896982°N 2.078966°W	2008	Anthony Stones	Statue on pedestal	Bronze and stone			Cheltenham Borough Council	The composer was born in Cheltenham

== Gloucester ==
Image	Title / subject	Location and coordinates	Date	Artist / designer	Type	Material	Dimensions	Designation	Owner / administrator	Notes
	King Charles II	Three Cocks Lane near St Mary's Square, Gloucester 51.867825°N 2.249129°W	1662	Stephen Baldwyn	Statue	Limestone		Grade II listed	Gloucester City Council	The statue was set up in the Wheat Market in Southgate Street. It was removed in the middle of the 18th century and considered lost until rediscovered in 1945 in pieces at Chex Hill. Re-erected 1960.
	Queen Anne	Gloucester Park 51.858040°N 2.247609°W	1712	John Ricketts the Elder	Statue	Limestone		Grade II listed	Gloucester City Council	Originally the statue stood at Southgate. Moved to its present site in 1865. The statue is badly weathered.
More images	Bishop John Hooper	St Mary's Square, Gloucester 51.868404°N 2.248764°W	1863	Edward Thornhill	Statue in canopy with pinnacle	Portland stone		Grade II listed	Gloucester Cathedral	Hooper was burned at the stake on the spot where the monument stands.
More images	Royal Gloucestershire Hussars Memorial	College Green, Gloucester	1922	Adrian Jones	Cross on pedestal with relief panels	Stone and bronze		Grade II*		
	War memorial	Gloucester Park	1925		Cenotaph with sphinx bust	Stone and bronze				
More images	Robert Raikes	Gloucester Park 51.860497°N 2.243591°W	1929	Thomas Brock	Statue on pedestal		Lifesized and on broad plinth of 2 metres.		Gloucester City Council	Copy of a marble statue in London.
More images	Spirit of Aviation	Northgate Street, Gloucester 51.866032°N 2.244816°W	1999	Simon Stringer	Statue	Bronze			Gloucester City Council	
More images	Emperor Nerva	Southgate Street, Gloucester 51.864640°N 2.246716°W	2002	Anthony Stones	Equestrian statue	Bronze			Gloucester City Council	The Emperor is acknowledged at founding the city of Gloucester around AD97
More images	The Candle	Victoria Dock, Gloucester Docks 51.862602°N 2.250417°W	2010	Wolfgang Buttress	Sculpture	Rolled steel	21 metres high		Gloucester City Council	Locals refer to it as The Kebab. It resembles cranes, ships' masts and chimneys
	The Kyneburgh Tower	Kimbrose Square, Gloucester 51.863269°N 2.248700°W	2011	Tom Price	Sculpture	Mild steel	16 metres high		Gloucester City Council	The final element of the Linkages scheme, connecting Gloucester Quays and the city centre

== Tewkesbury ==
Image	Title / subject	Location and coordinates	Date	Artist / designer	Type	Material	Dimensions	Designation	Owner / administrator	Notes
More images	War memorial	Church Street, Tewkesbury	1922		Cross on pedestal	Limestone		Grade II		
More images	War memorial	Stanway War Memorial, Stanway	1920	Alexander Fisher (statue), Philip Sidney Stott (column), Eric Gill (lettering)	Statue on pedestal	Bronze (statue), north Cotswold stone and sandstone (column and steps)		Grade II*		
	Touching Souls	Tewkesbury Abbey		Mico Kaufman						
