= Tewkesbury Town Council =

Type
- Type: Parish Council

Leadership
- Mayor: Emma Ash
- Deputy Mayor: Alan Hayes
- Town Clerk and RFO: Debbie Mason

Structure
- Seats: 16 councillors
- Independent: 16 / 16

Elections
- Voting system: Multiple non transferable vote
- Last election: 4 May 2023
- Next election: May 2027

Meeting place
- Town Hall, High Street, Tewkesbury

Website
- www.tewkesburytowncouncil.gov.uk

Tewkesbury Town Council is a local council covering the parish of Tewkesbury, Gloucestershire. It is a successor parish to the Tewkesbury Municipal Borough Council that existed prior to the reorganisation of English Local Government in April 1974. The Town Council in its original form was constituted by the Local Government (Successor Parishes) Order 1973, where Tewkesbury Town is listed in Schedule Part 1.

== History ==
=== Creation of Tewkesbury Town Council ===
Tewkesbury Town Council, in its current form as Tewkesbury Parish Council, met informally for the first time on 19 November 1973. It met formally for the first time on 17 December 1973, during this meeting which C. Burd was appointed as chairman until 1 April 1974. During 19 November 1973 meeting it was resolved that the council should have the status of a town council from 1 April 1974. This status does not result in additional powers or funding but in accordance Section 245 (6) of the Local Government Act 1972 has the effect of styling the Chairman/Vice-chairman of the council as Town Mayor and Deputy Town Mayor respectively.

During the meeting of 17 December 1973 it was agreed that there was no objection to the use by the new Tewkesbury Borough Council of the Borough Coat of Arms. It was also agreed that the insignia for Tewkesbury which predated the coat of arms would be the new town council's coat of arms which are still used by the council.

=== History between 1974 and 1980 ===
Tewkesbury Town Council began its formal role as the Parish Council for Tewkesbury in April 1974. The first chairman of Tewkesbury Parish Council was C. Burd, who was also the first Town Mayor of the post 1974 Town Council. All of the six Town Mayors who served between 1974 and 1980 are outlined along with the year of service in Table 1.

Table 1: List of Town Mayors between 1974 and 1980
Years	Mayor	Party
1974	C. Burd	Independent
1975	R.J. Bourton	Independent
1976	D.R. Graham	Independent
1977	B. Devereaux	Independent
1978	B. Devereaux	Independent
1979	J.W. Rennison	Independent

There were a number of miscellaneous provisions which needed to be resolved following the formation of the new Tewkesbury Borough and the new Town Council which were intended to be resolved by a statutory instrument made in April 1977. In April 1977, the Town Council received a number of properties from Tewkesbury Borough Council through the provisions of The Local Authorities etc. (Miscellaneous Provision) Order 1977. These properties included the Town Hall, Severn Ham SSSI, fishing rights, land at the Mythe Railway Nature Reserve and the lordship of the manor of Tewkesbury. Some of these properties have since been disposed of by the town council.

=== History between 1980 and 1990 ===
The Town Mayors during this time are outlined along with the year of service in Table 2.

Table 2: List of Town Mayors between 1980 and 1990
Years	Mayor	Party
1980	G.G Magress	Independent
1981	J.W. Castle	Independent
1982	P. Thorpe	Independent
1983	T.R Woollatt	Independent
1984	A.N. Crowther	Independent
1985	F.J.O. Martin	Independent
1986	J.L. Potter	Independent
1987	A.L.K Cadbury	Independent
1988	S.J. Greenland	Independent
1989	B. Devereaux	Independent

The land at the Mythe Railway Nature Reserve which had been received from Tewkesbury Borough Council in April 1977 through the provisions of The Local Authorities etc. (Miscellaneous Provision) Order 1977 became the property of the Gloucestershire Wildlife Trust in 1985.

=== History between 1990 and 2000 ===
The Town Mayors during this time are outlined along with the year of service in Table 3.

Table 3: List of Town Mayors between 1990 and 2000
Years	Mayor	Party
1990	J.W. Castle	Independent
1991	E.C. Heath	Independent
1992	T.R. Woollatt	Independent
1993	S.J. Greenland	Independent
1994	G.R. Moody	Independent
1995	P.J. Aldridge	Independent
1996	D.C. Leng	Independent
1997	H.W. Nash	Independent
1998	R.C. Selby	Independent
1999	P.J.Aldridge	Independent

During the 1990s the relationship between the town of Tewkesbury, Gloucestershire and Tewksbury, Massachusetts was strengthened and the possibility of a formal twinning was investigated. A formal twinning arrangement between the two towns was not progressed during the 1990s although a link was maintained during this time. The relationship between these two towns resulted in the placing of the Miko Kaufman sculpture called Touching Souls at Tewkesbury Abbey.

=== History between 2000 and 2010 ===
The Town Mayors during this time are outlined along with the year of service in the Table 4.

Table 4: List of Town Mayors between 2000 and 2010
Years	Mayor	Party
2000	P.J. Randell	Independent
2001	B.C. Calway	Independent
2002	J.A. Collip	Independent
2003	G.S. Dawson	Independent
2004	C.A. Danter	Independent
2005	E.C. Wright	Independent
2006	P.J. Aldridge	Independent
2007	K.M. Powell	Independent
2008	B.A. Cromwell	Independent
2009	P.N. Workman	Independent

Since January 2003, there has been a special relationship between Tewkesbury, Gloucestershire and Tewksbury Township, New Jersey.

=== History since 2010 ===
The Town Mayors during this time are outlined along with the year of service in Table 5. Tewkesbury Town Council has experienced a number of challenges between 2010 and the present day. Tewkesbury Town Council has also taken on additional responsibilities since 2010 including assuming ownership of two new toilet blocks in Gloucester Road and Oldbury Road in 2013.

Table 5: List of Town Mayors from 2010 to present
Years	Mayor
2010	G.R. Pope
2011	M.W. Pavey
2012	K.M. Powell
2013	C.A. Danter
2014	C.A. Danter
2015	J.R. Badham
2016	K.V. Brennan
2017	P.A. Clatworthy
2018	P.N. Workman
2018	C.A. Danter
2019	T. Walker
2020	P. Aldridge
2021	J. Raywood
2022	S. Raywood
2023	C.A. Danter
2024	P. M. Jones
2025	A. M. Hayes
2026	E. L. Ash

== Extent of Tewkesbury Town ==
Since the creation of Tewkesbury Town Council, the boundaries of the Parish have slightly changed most notably to cover part of the Newtown area which was formerly part of Ashchurch Parish. The M5 motorway forms part of the eastern boundary of the Town and the western side of junction 9 is within the parish. Within Tewkesbury Town are the Town Centre and the areas of Newtown, Priors Park, Mitton, Tewkesbury Park, Upper Lode, Stonehills and the Mythe. The Wheatpeices estate, Northway, and Ashchurch are not part of the Tewkesbury Town Council area but are covered by their own Parish Councils.

== Tewkesbury Town Clerk and Responsible Financial Officer ==
Tewkesbury Town Council as a Parish Council is required to appoint a Proper Officer and Responsible Finance Officer. As is the case with many Parish and Town Council's the Proper Officer is titled as the Town Clerk. There have as of February 2021 been eight Permanent Clerks of Tewkesbury Town Council including the Acting Clerk Mr F. Broxton. The current Clerk, Debbie Mason is assisted by a Deputy Clerk - Jen King.

Table 6: List of Town Clerks between 1973 to present
Years	Clerk
November 1973 - April 1974 (Acting Clerk)	F. Broxton
April 1974 - March 1981	L. Athay
March 1981 - March 1993	W. Blakemoore
March 1993 - 2008	M.G. Wilson
2008 - 2014	P.F. Clarke
2014 - March 2016	A. Beirne
March 2016 - December 2017	H. Railton-Price
February 2018 – Present	D. Mason

== Tewkesbury Town Hall ==
The Town Council is based at Tewkesbury Town Hall located at 18, High Street, Tewkesbury, Gloucestershire: it is a Grade II* building.

== Deaths in office of Tewkesbury town councillors ==
Despite Tewkesbury Town Council having been in operation since 1974 only five Councillors have died whilst holding public office. The names of Tewkesbury Town Councillors who have died in office are listed in Table 7.

Table 7: List of Councillors who died in Office since 1974
Years	Councillor
1978	D.R. Graham
1988	L.F. Gurney
1990	J.G. Crawford
1993	J.W. Castle
1993	G. Campbell-Browning

== Population of the Parish of Tewkesbury Town ==
At the time of the 2011 Census, the population of the Parish was 10,704 residents. This places Tewkesbury Town as the 492nd largest Parish or Community Council in the United Kingdom. The population of Tewkesbury Town is between that of Amesbury and Birchwood Parishes.

== Membership of Tewkesbury Town Council ==
The Town Council is currently made up of sixteen councillors who serve a population of 10,704 according to the figures released from the 2011 census. The Town Councillors formerly represented four wards of Mythe, Priors Park, Tewkesbury Town with Mitton and Newtown. The number of wards was reduced to three wards of Tewkesbury North, Tewkesbury South and Newtown at the time of the ordinary election in May 2019.

Elections to Tewkesbury Town Council last took place in May 2023 and councillors have been co-opted since the last election. Table 8 lists the current Town Councillors grouped by the Ward they represent.

Table 8: List of current Town Councillors arranged by ward represented
Ward	Councillor
Tewkesbury South	Hilarie Bowman
Tewkesbury South	Philip Brookes
Tewkesbury South	Cate Cody
Tewkesbury South	Chris Danter
Tewkesbury South	Joe Jones
Tewkesbury South	Katie Moran
Tewkesbury South	Joanne Raywood
Tewkesbury South	Simon Raywood
Newtown	Alan Hayes
Newtown	Catherine Robertson
Newtown	Vernon Smith
Tewkesbury North	Emma Ash
Tewkesbury North	Rachael Bartlett
Tewkesbury North	Rod Gurney
Tewkesbury North	Paul Jones
Tewkesbury North	Mike Sztymiak

The next elections to Tewkesbury Town Council are due to take place in May 2027. These elections will occur at the same time as the ordinary elections for Tewkesbury Borough Council.

== Community Service Award ==
Since 1983 Tewkesbury Town Council has given a community service award to individuals who have made a significant contribution to the live of the Town. As of 14 May 2018 the Town Council has made this award to sixty individuals. All individuals given this award are noted on a board on the wall of the Town Hall. These awards are presented at the Annual Meeting of the Town Council which is also known as the Mayor Making Ceremony. Those listed in Table 9 have received the Community Service Award from Tewkesbury Town Council.

Table 9: List of Community Service Award recipients
Years	Community Service Award recipient
1983	G.S. Brown
1984	V.L. Caudle
1984	C. Durrant
1985	J.R. Griffiths
1986	J. Lampitt
1987	M. Bigland
1987	A.E. Leach
1990	B.K.R. Durrant
1990	N. Newman
1991	E.M. Knowle
1992	R.J. Bourton
1992	F.W. Sears
1993	E.D. Horner
1994	F.J.O. Martin*
1994	C. Burd
1995	E.H. Preston
1995	M.E. Minter
1996	D.H. Green
1996	S. Haines
1997	J.C. and J. Faull
1997	G. Durrant
1998	N.E. Davies
1998	E.C. Heath
1999	S.J. Goodchild
1999	R.F. Gurney
2000	B. Devereux
2001	J. Morgan
2002	S. Danby
2002	D. Hobbs
2004	S.J. Greenland
2004	P. Sinnott
2005	E.A. Ealand
2005	J.R.B. Gamble
2006	A.B. Cresswell
2007	P.A. Clatworthy
2007	W.G. Danter*
2008	E.A. and E.E. Mills
2008	A. Baldwin
2009	A. Walker
2009	E. Sinnott
2009	L. Stamp
2010	A.R. Lawrence
2010	E.A. Hughes
2011	H. Robertson
2011	S. and A. Haycock
2012	H. Ledge
2012	M.F. White
2013	A. Cadbury
2013	H. Workman
2014	J. Savory
2014	H. Nash*
2015	N. Morgan
2016	A. Turner
2016	S. Bailey (YA)
2017	B. Reeve
2018	S. Coulton
2018	M. Wilson
2018	P. South
2018	S. Perry
2018	R. Taylor - (YA)
2019	H & Mrs H Walters
2019	O. Dare (YA)
2019	S. Gilchrist (YA)
2020	J. Kinghorn
2020	G. Pope
2020	R. Bagley (YA)
2021	M. Badham
2021	E. Dare
2021	H. Carver
2022	I. Boskett
Recipients marked with a * were awarded posthumously. Recipients marked with a (YA) were awarded the Youth Award.

== See also ==
- Parish councils in England
