= Bengrove =

Village in Gloucestershire, England

Coordinates: 51.9922°N 02.0409°W

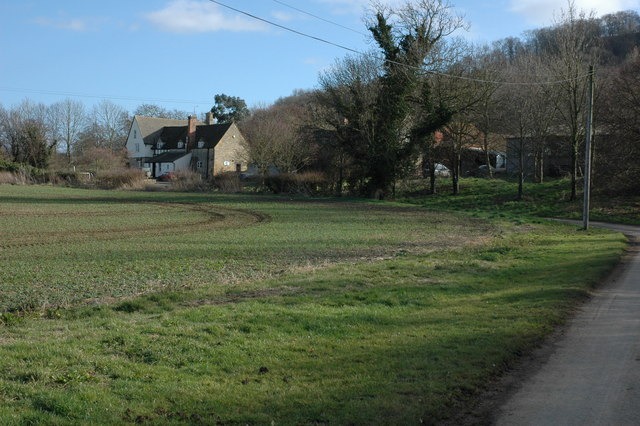
- Bengrove

- Location within Gloucestershire
- OS grid reference: SO9732
- Shire county: Gloucestershire
- Region: South West
- Country: England
- Sovereign state: United Kingdom
- Police: Gloucestershire
- Fire: Gloucestershire
- Ambulance: South Western

Bengrove is a village in Gloucestershire, England. It lies between Teddington and Alstone. Bengrove, Teddington and Alstone now lie in the Anglican Diocese of Worcester, although they have been part of Gloucestershire since 1932, falling within the borough and Parliamentary constituency of Tewkesbury.

Bengrove farmhouse was built in the early 18th century, and Bangrove Farm in the 1660s.
