= Woolstone =

Woolstone may refer to the following places in England:

- Woolstone, Gloucestershire
- Woolstone, Milton Keynes in Buckinghamshire
- Woolstone, Oxfordshire
