= Tewkesbury Town Hall =

Municipal building in Tewkesbury, Gloucestershire, England

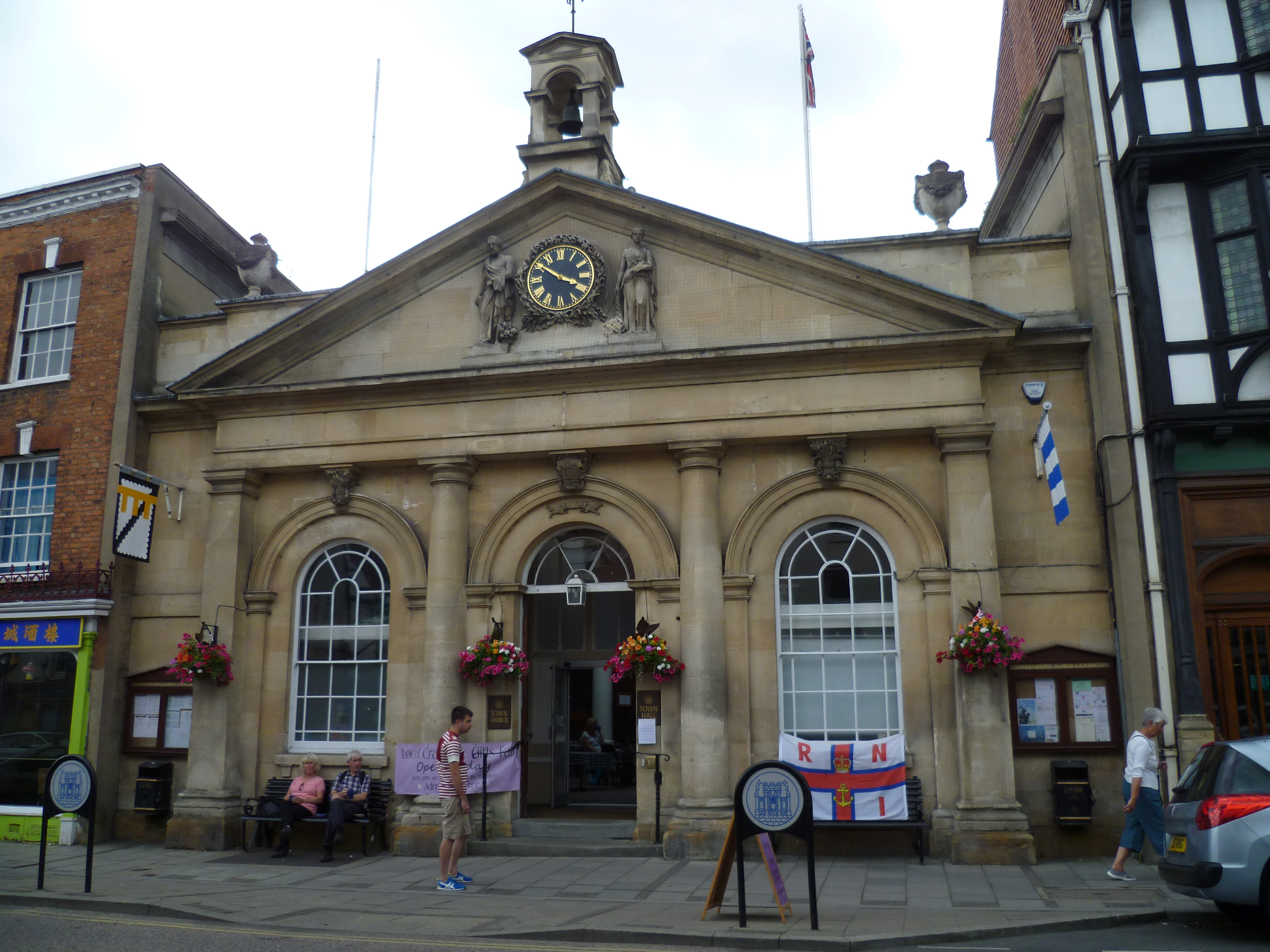
- Tewkesbury Town Hall

- Shown in Gloucestershire
- 51.9939°N 2.1574°W
- Location: High Street, Tewkesbury

History
- Built: 1788

Site notes
- Architectural style: Neoclassical style

Listed Building – Grade II*
- Official name: Town Hall
- Designated: 4 March 1952
- Reference no.: 1206399

Tewkesbury Town Hall is a municipal building in the High Street in Tewkesbury, Gloucestershire, England. The building, which is the meeting place of Tewkesbury Town Council, is a Grade II* listed building.

== History ==
The first town hall was a medieval structure on the west side of the High Street at the corner with Church Street. The building, which was rebuilt in 1586, was arcaded on the ground floor so that markets could be held, with an assembly room on the first floor. However, the location of the building impeded the traffic and so in the 1780s the local member of parliament, Sir William Codrington, offered to pay for a new municipal building further north on the same side of the High Street.

The new building was designed in the neoclassical style, built in ashlar stone and was completed just in time for a visit by King George III, accompanied by Queen Charlotte, in July 1788. The original structure was a two-storey building set well back from the High Street with a corn exchange in front. The area became a municipal borough with the town hall as its headquarters in 1835. Three cells were created in the basement for use by the local police force in 1839, and a market hall was added in front of the original structure at around the same time. After those works had been completed, the completed design involved a symmetrical main frontage with three bays facing onto the High Street; it featured a rounded headed doorway with a fanlight flanked by round headed sash windows set in a tetrastyle portico with Doric order columns, which flanked the centre bay, and Doric order pilasters, which flanked the outer bays, supporting an entablature and a pediment, with a clock and two supporting stone statues in the tympanum. At roof level there was a small bell turret. Internally, the original two-storey building contained a courtroom on the ground floor and a ballroom on the first floor: the ballroom was later converted to create a council chamber and a mayor's parlour. The building was altered again, to the designs of Medland and Son, in 1891.

An Anglo-American garden of remembrance and riverside walk, intended to commemorate the lives of service personnel from both nations who had died in the Second World War, was established behind the complex in 1962. The town hall continued to serve as the headquarters of Tewkesbury Municipal Borough Council for much of the 20th century but ceased being the local seat of government when the enlarged Tewkesbury Borough Council was formed with new offices on Gloucester Road in 1974. The town hall then became the meeting place of Tewkesbury Town Council instead.

Works of art in the town hall include a portrait by Nathaniel Dance-Holland of Sir William Codrington, and a portrait by George Romney of the local member of parliament, James Martin.

== See also ==
- Grade II* listed buildings in Tewkesbury (borough)
