= Charlton Abbots =

Village in Gloucestershire, England

Coordinates: 51.916345°N 1.9525853°W

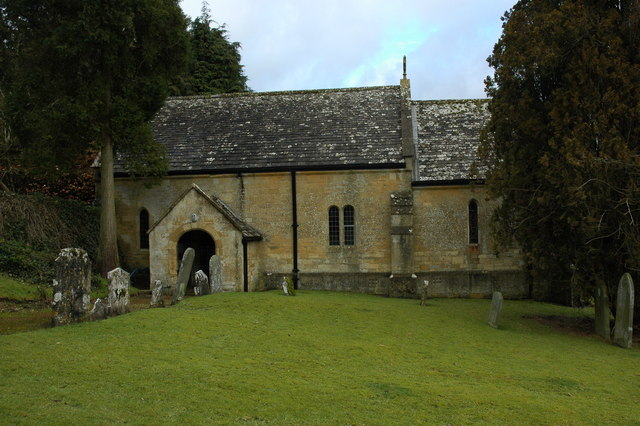

- Location within Gloucestershire
- Civil parish: Sudeley
- District: Tewkesbury
- Shire county: Gloucestershire
- Region: South West
- Country: England
- Sovereign state: United Kingdom
- Police: Gloucestershire
- Fire: Gloucestershire
- Ambulance: South Western

Charlton Abbots is a village and former civil parish 12 miles (19 km) east of Gloucester, now in the parish of Sudeley, in the Tewkesbury district, in the county of Gloucestershire, England. In 1931 the parish had a population of 71.

== History ==
The name "Charlton" means 'Free peasants farm/settlement', the "Abbots" part being from the fact that it was held by Winchcombe Abbey. Charlton Abbots was recorded in the Domesday Book as Cerletone. On 25 March 1883 part of Winchcombe parish was transferred to Charlton Abbots. On 1 April 1935 the parish was abolished and merged with Sudeley Manor and part of Sevenhampton to form Sudeley.
