= St Michael & All Angels Church, Bishop's Cleeve =

St Michael & All Angels' Church, Bishop's Cleeve
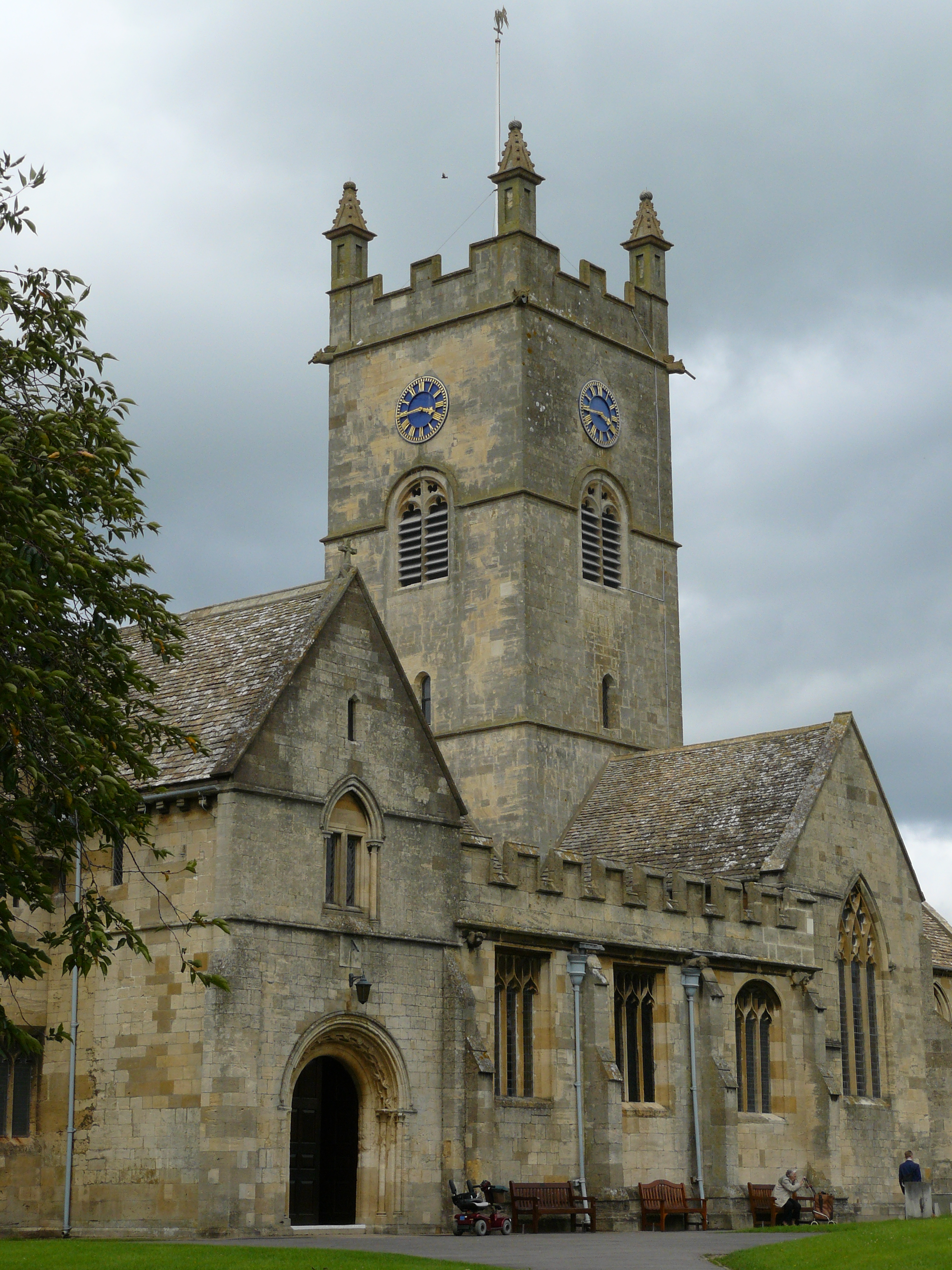
- St Michael & All Angels' Church, Bishop's Cleeve
- St Michael & All Angels' Church, Bishop's Cleeve
- 51.9481°N 2.0585°W
- Location: Bishop's Cleeve, Gloucestershire
- Country: England
- Denomination: Church of England

History
- Dedicated: 1066

Architecture
- Architect: various

Administration
- Diocese: Diocese of Gloucester

St Michael & All Angels is the Anglican church in the village of Bishop's Cleeve, just north of Cheltenham in Gloucestershire. Informally the church is known simply as St Michael's.

== History ==
The church building is Grade I listed, with parts dating back over 900 years. It was originally a monastic settlement in Anglo-Saxon times, which is how the village of Bishops Cleeve began. Later, after the Norman Conquest in 1066, the main body of the church was built as a Catholic church. Parts of the frescoes on the walls still remain to this day, and it was a popular place for pilgrims to visit. The Delabere family later then added to the main body of the church, in the 1700s, with places for the growing congregation to sit; the family are now buried in their tomb inside the church. The tomb is one of the main reasons for tourists to visit Cleeve and the church, but it is in desperate need of restoration. St Michael's bell tower also boasts the oldest in-use oak staircase in Britain, and won an award for the restoration in June 2016.

== Bells ==
There are 9 bells in the church tower: a full peal of 8 which are rung for services and special occasions, and a little 'sanctus' bell. (In the past the sanctus bell would be rung at various points in a Holy Communion service, but this practice is generally not followed nowadays.)

Weights (in cwt), notes and dates of the bells are shown in the table below:

Bell	Weight	Nominal	Note	Diameter	Cast	Founder	Canons
1	5-0-27	1280.0	Eb	28.38"	1951	John Taylor & Co	F
2	5-3-1	1206.0	D	29.50"	1951	John Taylor & Co	F
3	6-1-8	1073.0	C	32.13"	c1700	Abraham I Rudhall	Y
4	7-3-16	956.0	Bb	35.25"	1758	Abel Rudhall	Y
5	8-2-11	853.0	Ab	36.88"	1740	Abel Rudhall	Y
6	9-3-13	803.5	G	38.63"	1854	William Taylor	Y
7	13-2-7	717.0	F	43.50"	1700	Abraham I Rudhall	R
8	19-2-21	638.0	Eb	47.50"	1933	John Taylor & Co	F
Sanctus	0-2-10			13.88"	1695	Abraham I Rudhall	Y

Further details of the bells are available at the Dove's Guide entry for Bishop's Cleeve.

== Churchyard ==
The churchyard contains war graves of three soldiers of World War I and a soldier and an airman of World War II.

== Churches and parishes ==
=== Benefice of Bishop's Cleeve and Woolstone with Gotherington and Oxenton ===
As is common in the Church of England, St Michael's is part of a complex structure of rural parishes.

The overall benefice of Bishop's Cleeve and Woolstone with Gotherington and Oxenton is made up of two ecclesiastical parishes - Bishop's Cleeve, and Woolstone with Gotherington and Oxenton.

The parish of Bishop's Cleeve includes the villages of Bishop's Cleeve, Southam, Woodmancote and Cleeve Hill. Unusually it has two church buildings - St Michael & All Angels at Bishop's Cleeve and The Ascension at Southam. (The Ascension is strictly only a second 'worship centre', not a parish church - although it's known informally as Southam's church, legally the parish church of Southam is still St Michael's. Until 2008 there was also St Peter's at Cleeve Hill, but this building is now disused.)

The parish of Woolstone with Gotherington and Oxenton encompasses the tiny villages of Woolstone and Oxenton, and the larger one of Gotherington. It also has two church buildings - St Martin de Tours at Woolstone, and St John the Baptist at Oxenton, but there is no Anglican church building at Gotherington even though most of the population live there.
