= Old Baptist Chapel, Tewkesbury =

Coordinates: 51°59′29″N 2°09′40″W

The Old Baptist Chapel is a Grade II* listed building situated in Church Street, Tewkesbury, UK. Records show that a Baptist congregation has been in existence in the town since 1623, but the exact date of the present building is unknown.

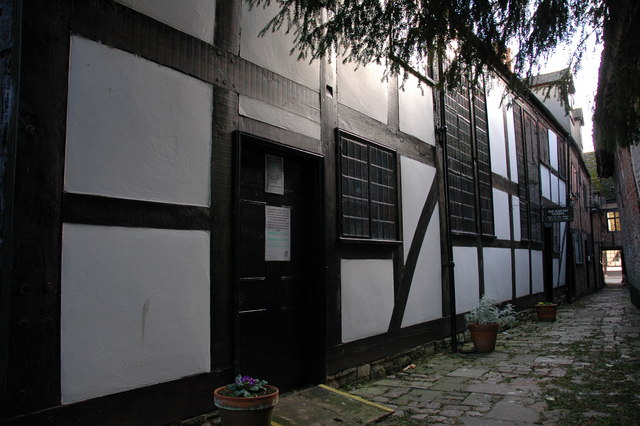
Old Baptist Chapel, Tewkesbury

The building was originally a timber-framed house, believed to date from the 15th century, standing in a back alley now known as "Old Baptist Chapel Court", opposite Tewkesbury Abbey, and may have begun to be used as a meeting place by the local Baptists as early as 1620. The house was adapted, probably in around 1720, for use by the local Baptist congregation in their worship, and a baptistery was installed. The façade and windows date from this conversion.

Later in the 18th century, a new Baptist chapel was built in nearby Cheltenham, and in 1805 a new chapel opened in Tewkesbury, with the old chapel being converted back to residential use. In the 1970s, it was restored by the local authority, Tewkesbury Borough Council, and now appears much as it would have done in 1720. The 1805 building was replaced during the 1980s.

The old chapel is now managed by the John Moore Museum on behalf of Tewkesbury's Abbey Lawn Trust. In 2015, it was awarded a grant of £189,500 from the Heritage Lottery Fund towards a three-year programme of refurbishment, resulting in the installation of kitchen and toilet facilities. Behind the chapel is a small cemetery, now administered by Tewkesbury Borough Council. The chapel is open to the public and is used as a concert venue, among other things.
