= Stanway War Memorial =

World War I memorial in Stanway, Gloucestershire, England

- United Kingdom
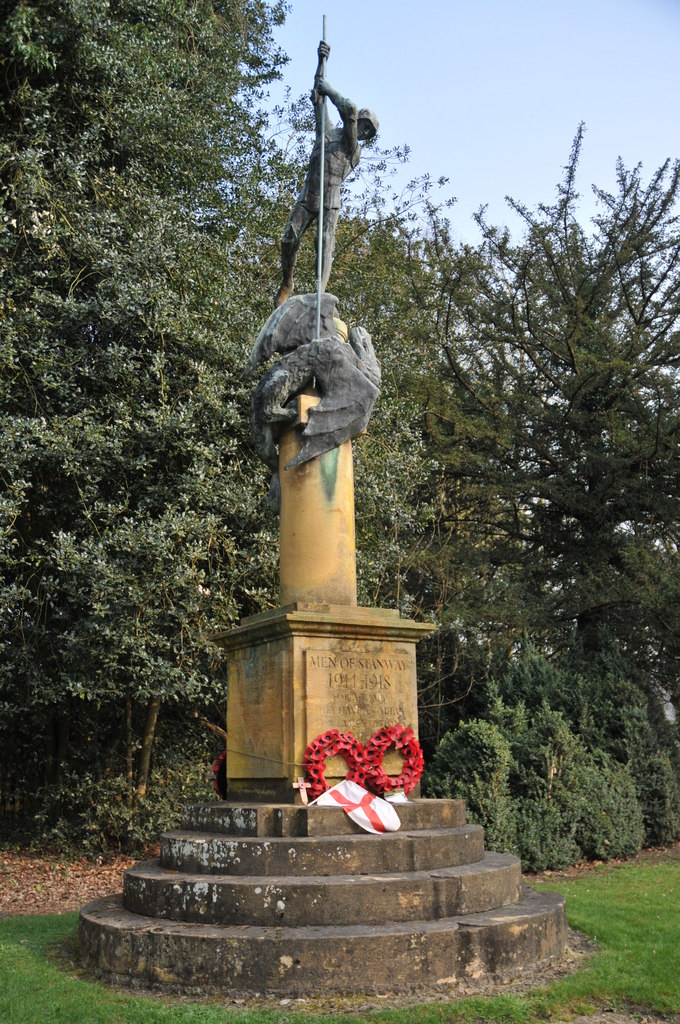
- For men from Stanway killed in the First World War
- Unveiled: 30 October 1920
- Location: 51.9878°N 1.9126°W; Stanway, Gloucestershire
- Designed by: Alexander Fisher (statue); Philip Sidney Stott (column); Eric Gill (lettering)

Listed Building – Grade II*
- Official name: Stanway War Memorial
- Designated: 7 September 1987
- Reference no.: 1154209

Stanway War Memorial is a First World War memorial in the village of Stanway in Gloucestershire, England. It is a grade II* listed structure.

== History ==
The First World War saw the deaths of over 880,000 members of the British Armed Forces. The scale of loss, impacting almost every community in the country, occasioned a deep emotional need to honour the dead; "no greater wave of public remembrance has ever happened in history". This reaction saw the creation of tens of thousands of war memorials across Britain, from simple wooden plaques recording the names of the dead, to national monuments such as The Cenotaph on Whitehall in London. (Note: During the centenary commemorations in 2018-2018, Historic England listed, or upgraded existing listings, for over 2,500 war memorials.)

The village of Stanway in north Gloucestershire, a small settlement of some 300 people, contains two such war memorials; a commemoration in the stained glass window in the church chancel, and a column and sculpture at a crossroads to the south of the village. Both were the inspiration of Lady Mary Elcho, whose husband's family, the Earls of Wemyss and March owned the manor in the village, Stanway House. Two of the Elcho's four sons had been killed in the war, Yvo in 1915 and Hugo in 1916. Lady Elcho chaired a village committee which undertook fundraising for the memorial, and she commissioned Alexander Fisher, a sculptor, painter and jeweller who had worked for her mother, to design the bronze statue of Saint George and the Dragon which forms the centrepiece of the memorial. Advice on the design was given by Philip Sidney Stott, an engineer and architect who lived at nearby Stanton and who created the column and steps; while the lettering of the inscriptions was undertaken by Eric Gill. The memorial was unveiled on 30 October 1920, and was dedicated by Edgar Gibson, Bishop of Gloucester. The memorial carries only the names of the dead of the First World War; unlike many such village memorials, it was not altered after the Second World War to record the names of the local dead from that conflict.

== Architecture and description ==
"Stanway epitaph
FOR YOUR
TO-MORROW
WE GAVE
OUR TO-DAY

–Imperial War Museum register

The Stanway memorial comprises four steps, supporting a column with a square base and cylindrical pillar, and surmounted by the statue of St George and the dragon in bronze. The column is constructed of north Cotswold stone mined at the local Jackdaw Quarry, while the steps are local sandstone. The square base of the column carries inscriptions on all four faces; three record the names of the dead of the village, while the fourth bears a four-line epitaph: [see box]. David Verey and Alan Brooks, in their Gloucestershire 1: The Cotswolds volume in the Buildings of England series, revised and reissued in 2000, describe the memorial as "superb" and Fisher's statue as "outstandingly fine". The memorial is a Grade II* listed structure.

== Gallery ==
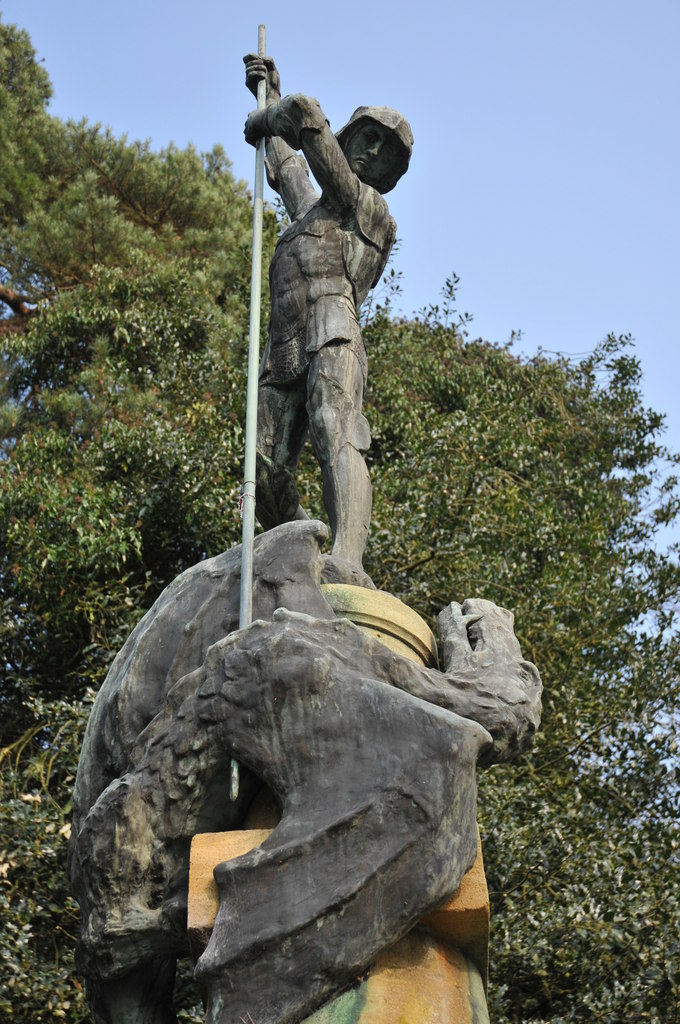
Detail

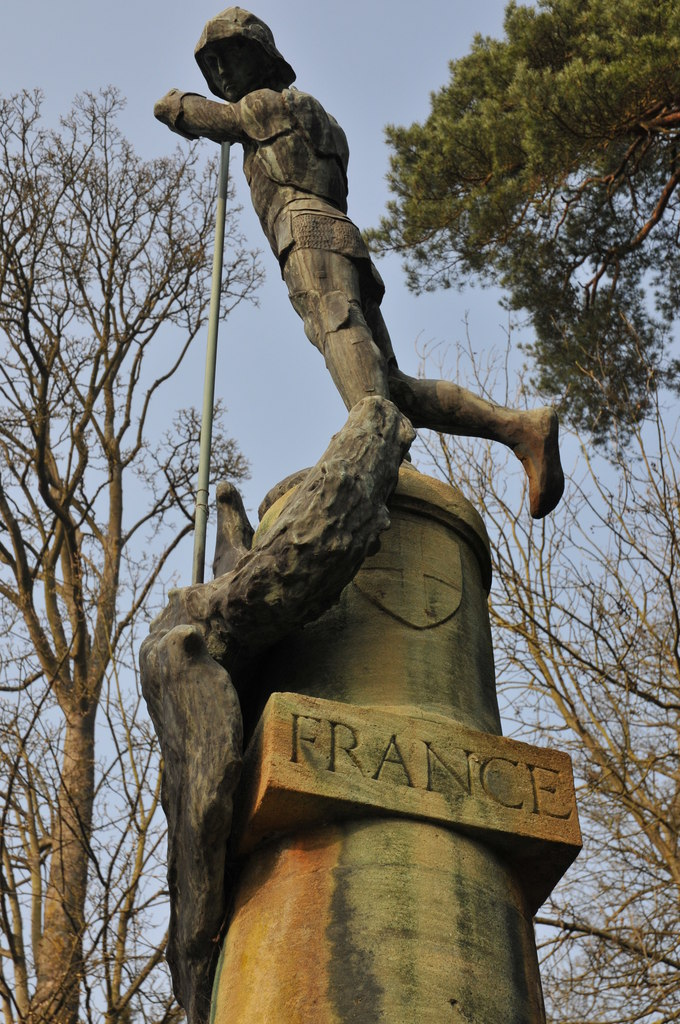
Oblique view

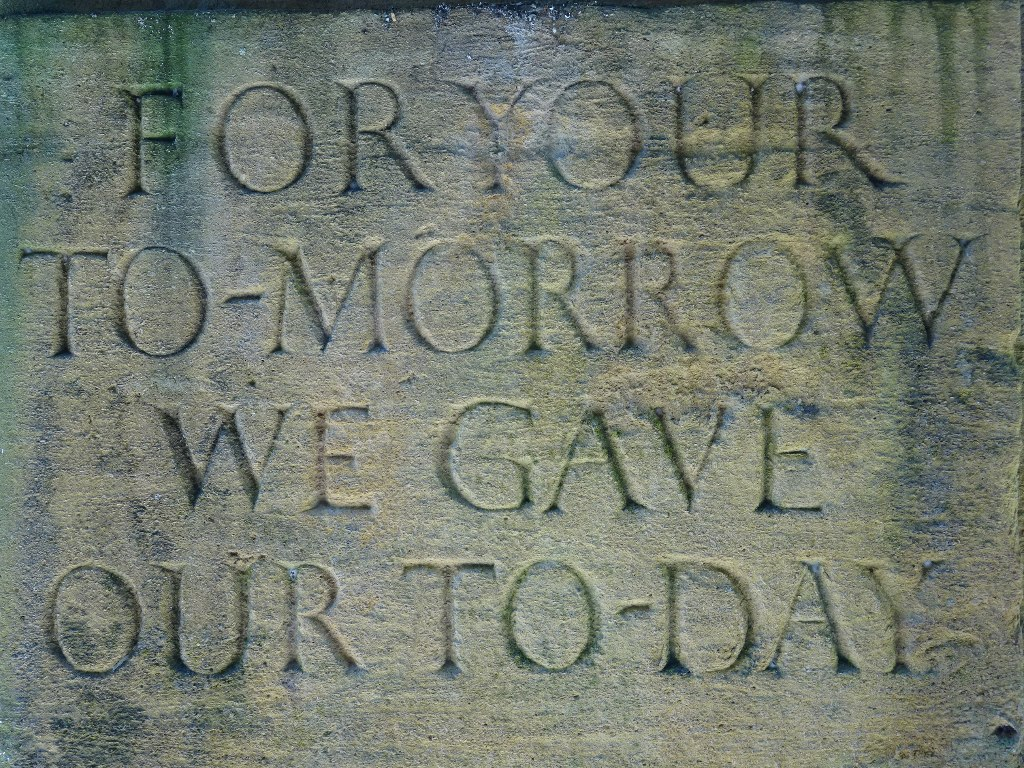
The epitaph with Gill lettering

== Sources ==
- Verey, David; Brooks, Alan (2000). Gloucestershire 1: The Cotswolds. Buildings of England. New Haven, US and London: Yale University Press. ISBN 978-0-140-71098-4.
