= Brockworth Court =

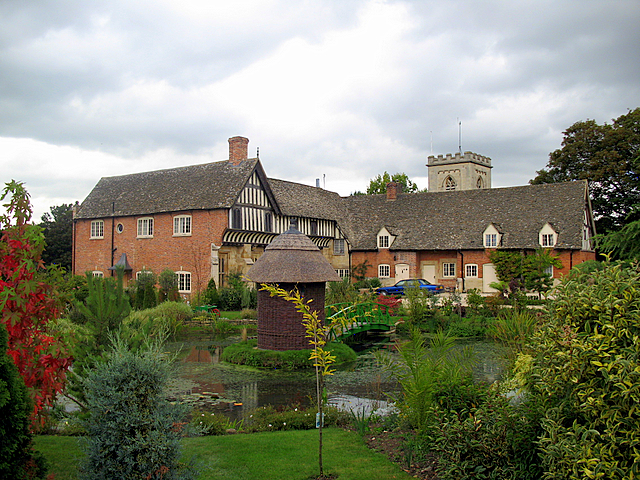

- Location within Gloucestershire
- 51°51′06″N 2°09′33″W
- Type: House
- Location: Brockworth, Gloucestershire

Site notes
- Governing body: Privately owned

Listed Building – Grade II*
- Official name: Brockworth Court
- Designated: 10 January 1955
- Reference no.: 1091764

Listed Building – Grade II*
- Official name: Tithe Barn NE of Brockworth Court
- Designated: 10 January 1955
- Reference no.: 1152564

Brockworth Court is a Tudor house in the village of Brockworth, Gloucestershire, England. Dating from the 16th century, it is a Grade II* listed building.

== House ==
The original house was granted to Llanthony Secunda Priory in the 12th century and remained as a Prior's residence until the dissolution of the monasteries in 1540 when it was granted to the Guise family by king Henry VIII. It was altered and extended in the 18th and 19th centuries. A large tithe barn dating from pre-Tudor times, reflects the priory's wealth. Henry VIII and his second wife Anne Boleyn are noted as having visited in August 1535. Brockworth Court was inhabited by John Guise, the new Lord of the manor, in 1540. The Tithe Barn was almost completely destroyed by fire in 1996 and rebuilt using traditional materials and methods. The restoration work was granted an award by the CPRE. The court is a Grade II* listed building.

Nearby Brockworth Mill and Mill Farm were situated at the intersection of Mill Lane and Horsbere Brook. The Domesday Book records a corn mill in Brockworth. When the Witcombe Reservoir was built in 1863 the mill stopped working and fell into neglect.

== Gardens ==
The gardens at Brockworth Court are part of the National Gardens Scheme and are open to the public on selected days in May, June and September. Group tours of the house are available.

== Grounds ==
There are number of listed building within the grounds and surrounding area that still are or were part of Brockworth Court through history.

=== Tithe barn ===
The tithe barn is a Grade II* listed building, dating from the late-15th century or early-16th century. Built with a close-studded timber frame and square panels, with a stone slate roof.

=== Outbuilding and horse engine house ===
The outbuilding and horse engine house are Grade II listed buildings. The outbuilding is a late-16th-century to early-17th-century building made with square panels in a timber frame. The horse engine house is an octagonal 19th century building alongside the outbuilding.

=== Open fronted shelter shed ===
A late-18th-century to mid-19th-century Grade II open fronted shelter shed. Built in an L-shape from limestone rubble and stone slate roof.

=== Well head ===
It is understood to be an 18th-century Grade II listed well head built at the same time as Brockworth Courts' walled garden. Built from irregularly bonded red brick on a limestone plinth. The well head was restored in late-2023, as part of the requirements for the development of new housing to the north of Brockworth.

=== South wall ===
A Grade II listed wall to the south of the Brockworth Court building. Considered to have been built at the same time as the well head, it is an 18th-century red brick wall. This wall has been added to at various stages over time and includes ashlar sections, with additional red brick sections used to increase the height of the wall.

== Gallery ==
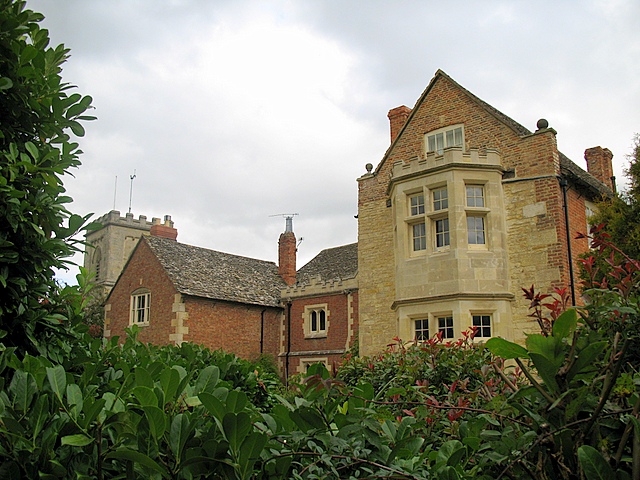
Brockworth Court

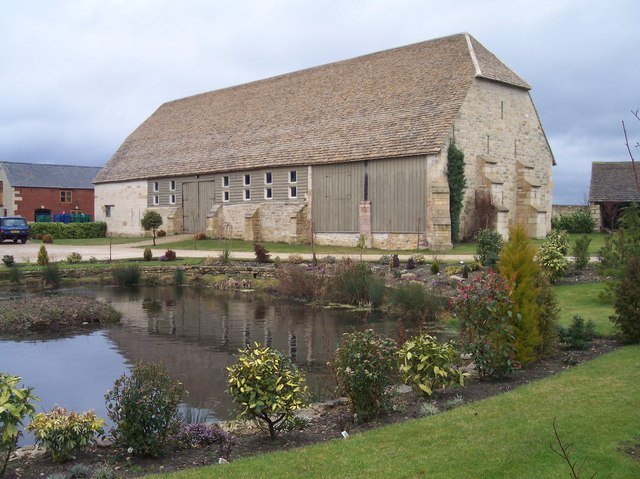
Tithe barn

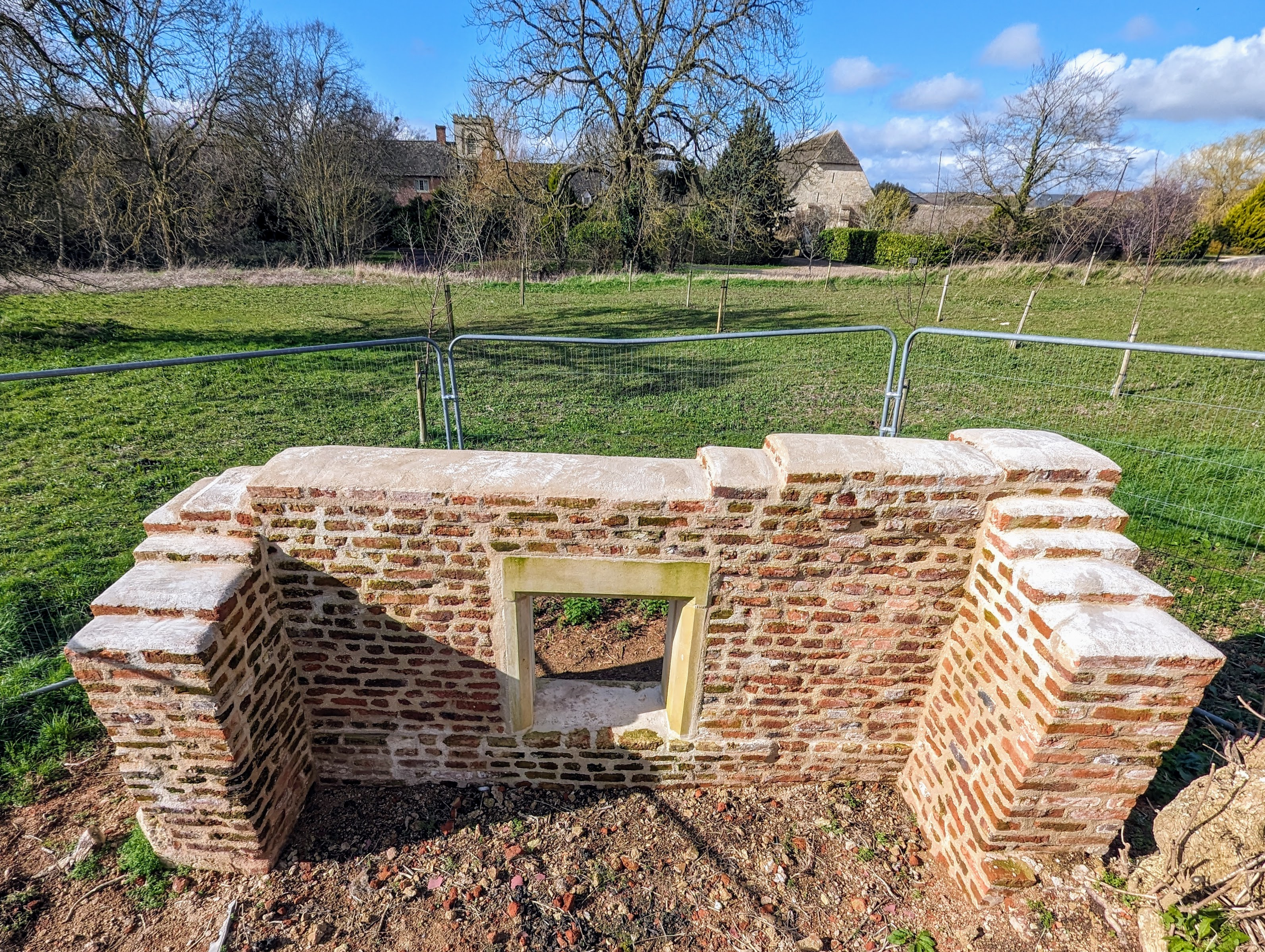
Well head

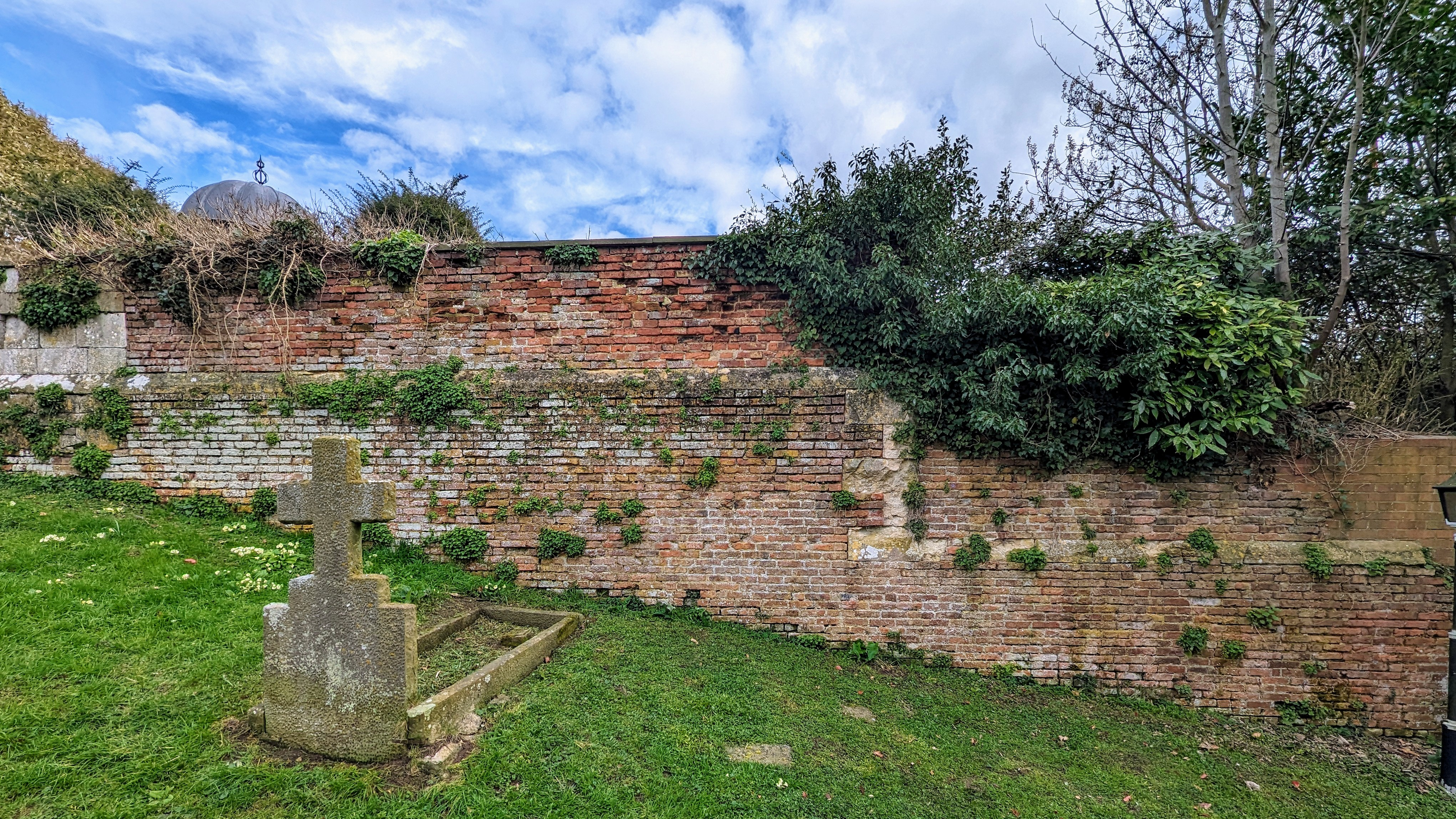
South wall

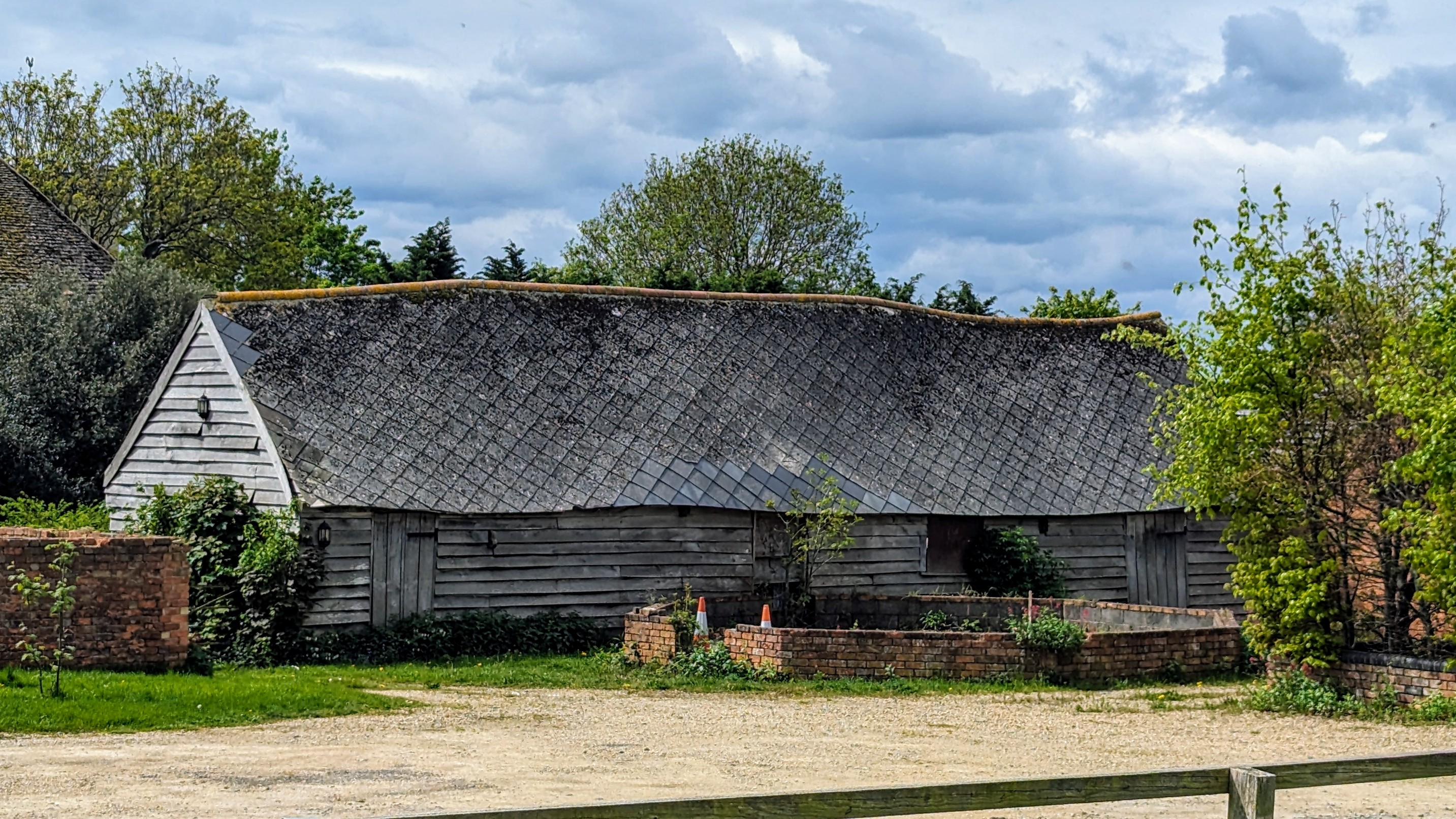
Outbuilding with horse engine shed foundation

== Sources ==
- Verey, David; Brooks, Alan (2002). Gloucestershire 2: The Vale and The Forest of Dean: Vale and Forest of Dean Pt. 2 (Pevsner Architectural Guides: Buildings of England) (3rd ed.). Yale University Press. ISBN 978-0300097337.
