= Abbey Gatehouse, Tewkesbury =

Gatehouse in Tewkesbury, Gloucestershire, England

Coordinates: 51.991137°N 2.161110°W

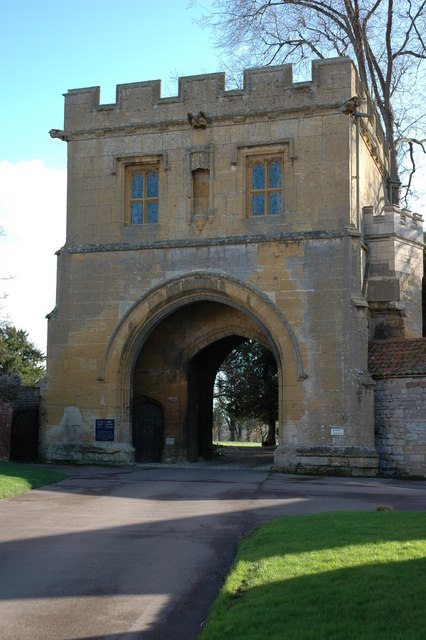
Abbey Gatehouse, Tewkesbury

Abbey Gatehouse is a gatehouse building to Tewkesbury Abbey, in Tewkesbury, Gloucestershire, England. It is a Grade I listed building.

== History ==
The building was constructed in stone ashlar around 1500 A.D, and has a single large room at first-floor level accessed by a narrow spiral stair. It survived the dissolution of the monasteries in 1540, but by the early 19th century the building had fallen into disrepair and was derelict. In 1849 the then owner, John Martin, M.P. for Tewkesbury, employed the services of local architect James Medland to undertake its repair and it was fully restored.

In the 20th century the building was used for various parish uses, but the difficult access restricted its useful purpose. In 1986 a lease was negotiated with the Landmark Trust, who set about refurbishing and conserving it, and providing facilities to suit its current use as holiday accommodation.
