= St John the Baptist's Church, Tredington =

Church of St John the Baptist
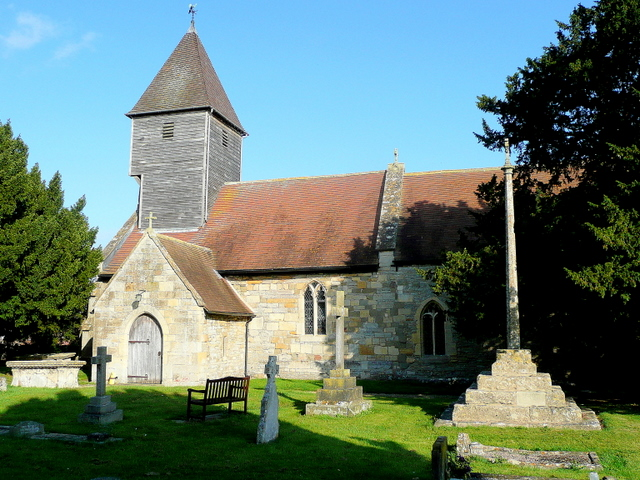
- Church of St John the Baptist
- 51°57′49.68″N 2°08′22.96″W
- OS grid reference: SO 90498 29492
- Country: England
- Denomination: Church of England

Architecture
- Heritage designation: Grade I listed
- Designated: 4 July 1960

Administration
- Diocese: Gloucester

St John the Baptist's Church is an Anglican church in Tredington, Gloucestershire, England, and in the Diocese of Gloucester. It is Grade I listed. The earliest parts of the church date from the 12th century, and the plan of the building is little changed from that time.

== History and description ==
The church, in existence by the 12th century, was originally a chapel of ease to Tewkesbury Abbey, being included in 1341 among the chapelries of Tewkesbury. It was recorded in 1572 as a parish church.

The building is of ashlar and coursed rubble; inside, the walls are bare of paint or plaster. There is a chancel, nave and south porch, and a west timber-framed tower. The south and north doorways, the chancel arch and one window in the chancel date from the 12th century, together suggesting that the plan of the building is not much changed from that time. The tower was erected in 1700, replacing a bell-cot, and rebuilt in 1883; the rebuilding, funded by John and Elizabeth Surman, included a pyramidal roof and a clock.

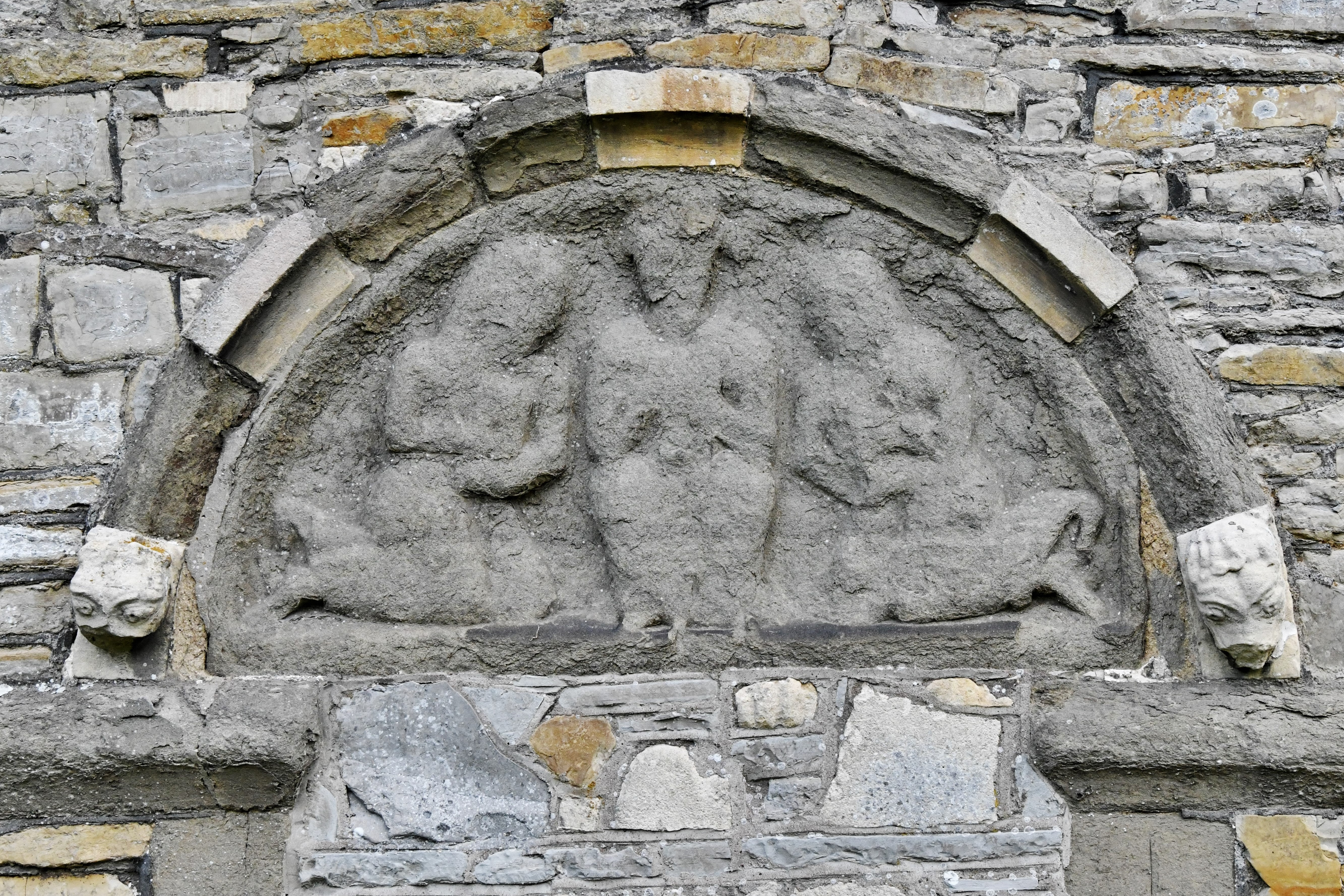
The tympanum above the north door

There is a Norman arch over the south doorway: it has two orders, both decorated with chevrons and with alternating sandstone and limestone voussoirs. There is a blocked north doorway, dating from the 12th century, with a carved sandstone tympanum above, now badly weathered. It depicts a seated figure flanked by two kneeling figures, each holding a book. The hood mould around the tympanum is of alternating sandstone and limestone and has animal head-stops.

The south porch has a datestone showing the date 1624 and initials CB, thought to be those of Charles Bick. One of the stone flags in the floor of the porch has an embedded fossilised skeleton of an ichthyosaurus.

=== Interior ===
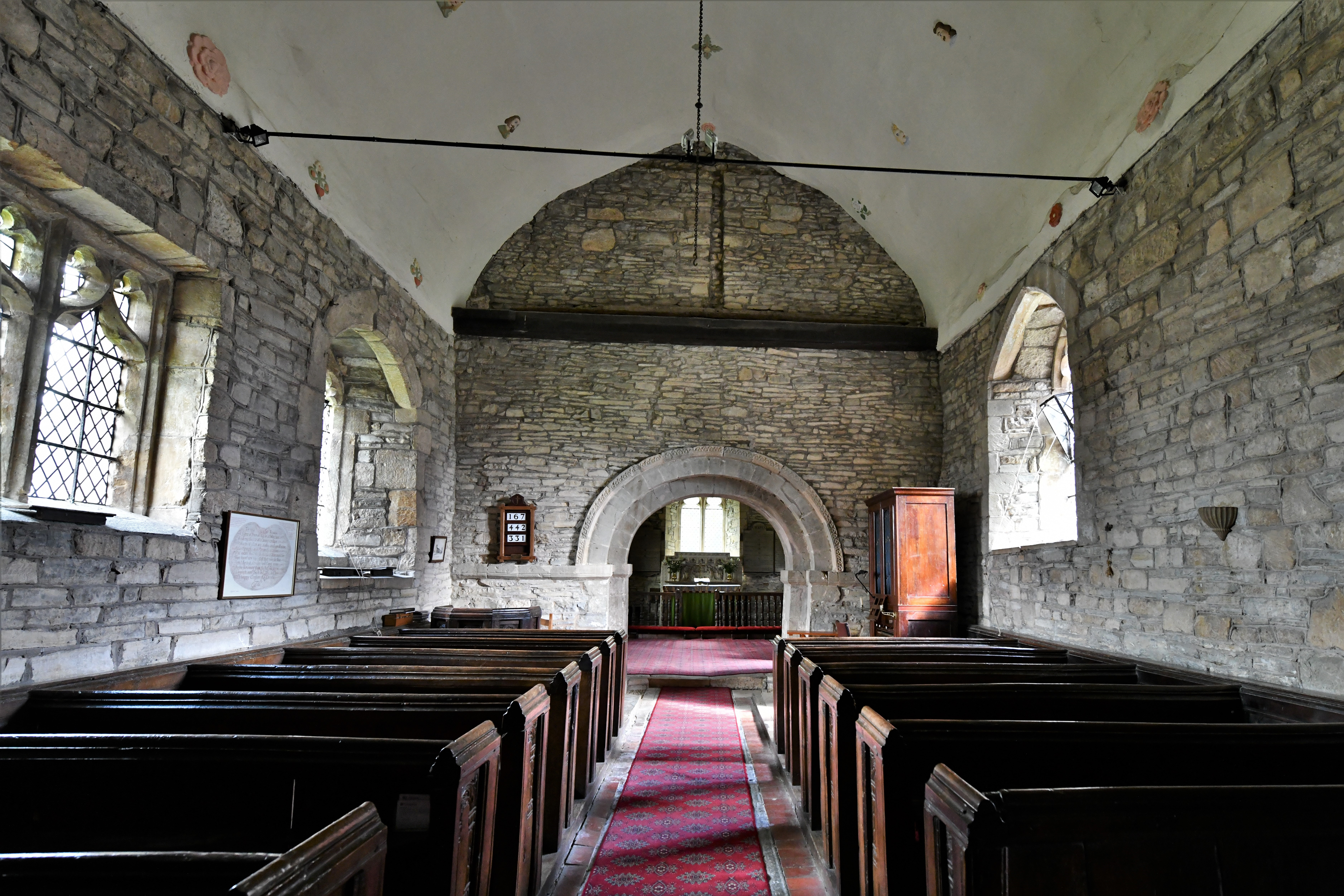
The nave, looking towards the Norman chancel arch

Inside, the wide chancel arch has on the nave side two orders and a decorated hood mould. In the chancel, there is a long stone bench set against the north wall, and one of the windows in the south wall, narrow and round-headed, is Norman. The altar-rails date from the early 17th century. There are monumental inscriptions in the chancel including several for members of the Surman, Cartwright and Bick families in the 17th and 18th centuries.

The pews and oak pulpit have similar Jacobean-style carvings, and are thought to date from the late 18th century. There is a coat of arms on the west wall of the nave of the Surman family, for many years lords of the manor at Tredington Court.

=== Churchyard ===
In the churchyard is a tall slender cross shaft, on a square plinth with four steps, dating from the 14th century. It is Grade II listed. The cross at the apex is 19th or 20th-century.
