= Mythe Railway Nature Reserve =

Nature reserve in Gloucestershire, England

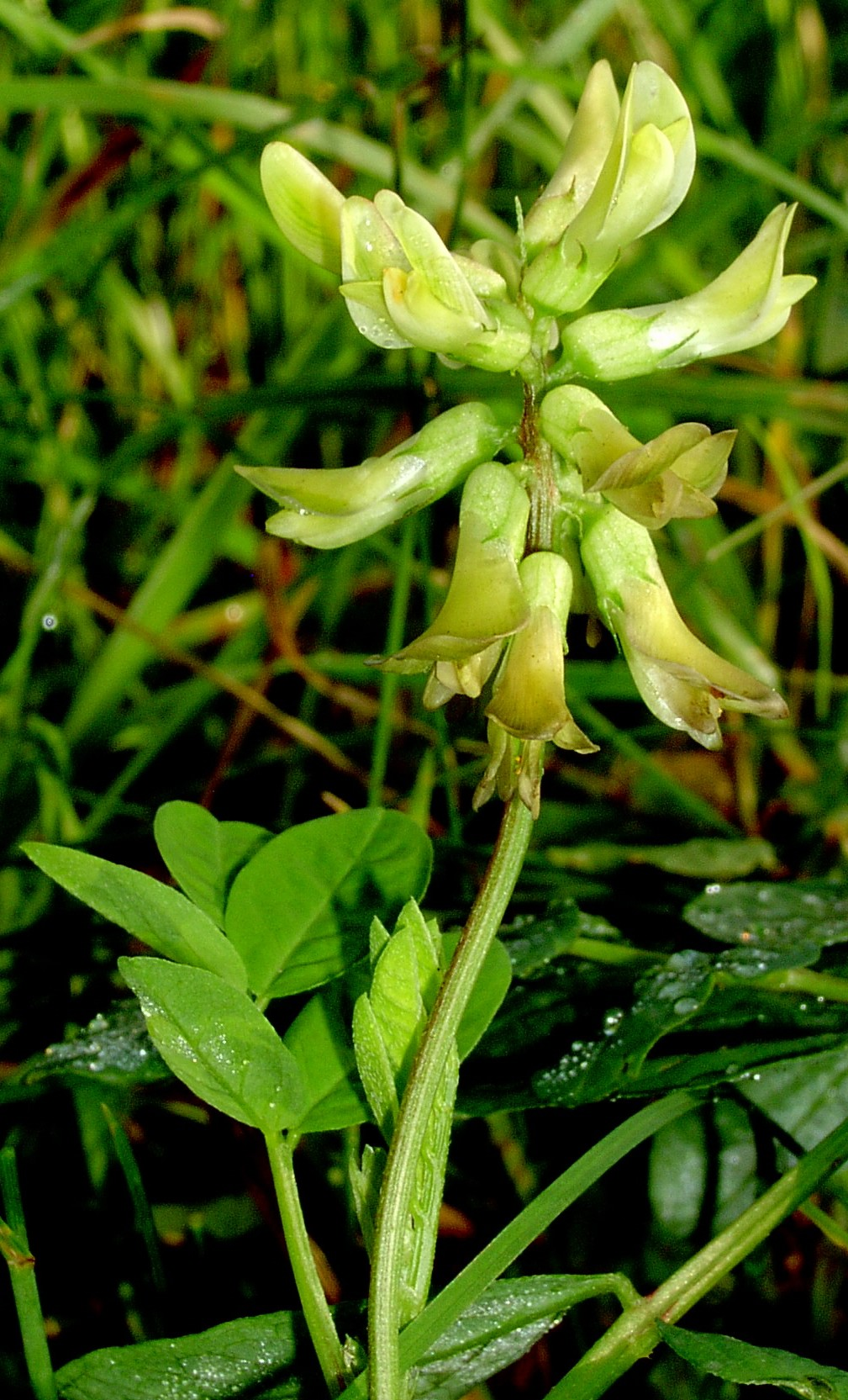
- Wild liquorice (Astragalus glycyphyllos)

- Location within Gloucestershire
- Type: Gloucestershire Wildlife Trust nature reserve
- Location: north of Tewkesbury
- Coordinates: 52°0′20.41″N 2°9′55.08″W
- Area: 7 acres (2.8 ha)
- Created: 1974 (lease) 1984 (purchase)
- Operator: Gloucestershire Wildlife Trust
- Status: Open all year

Mythe Railway Nature Reserve (grid reference SO887341) is a 2.8-hectare (6.9-acre) nature reserve in Gloucestershire. The site is listed in the ‘Tewkesbury Borough Local Plan to 2011’, adopted March 2006, Appendix 3 'Nature Conservation',' as a Key Wildlife Site (KWS).

The site is owned and managed by the Gloucestershire Wildlife Trust. It was held under lease from Tewkesbury Town Council for ten years from 1974. It was purchased by the Trust in 1984.

== Location and habitat ==
The reserve is west of the A38 road and about one mile north of Tewkesbury. It lies between two rivers being the Severn and the Avon. The word 'Mythe' indicates a strip of land between two rivers. The reserve is a 700-yard stretch which starts from close to the northern entrance to Mythe Tunnel and is on the western slope of Mythe Hill.

The railway ran from Ashchurch to Great Malvern and was closed in 1961. It had operated for about one hundred years. Part of the old Salt Way from Droitwich runs below and parallel with the railway, called Paget's Way. This track provides access to the reserve.

The Tewkesbury and Malvern Railway on this section was constructed through an outcrop of Keuper Marl and thus has a range of plants which are unusual within the wider area. The site also provides warm, sheltered conditions. An osier bed and flood meadows adjoin the site, but these are not part of the nature reserve. There is a platform at the top of the embankment which provides good views over the Severn.

== Flora ==
The reserve supports two uncommon legumes being narrow-leaved everlasting-pea and wild liquorice. The embankments have colonised naturally and support yellow-wort, lady's bedstraw, ploughman's-spikenard, field scabious and marjoram. The track bed supports common restharrow, wild strawberry and common toadflax.

There are tree growing along the top of the embankment. These include wild service-trees. Also present are hawthorn, blackthorn, dog-rose, bramble, spindle, ash and field maple.

== Bird life ==
Recorded for the site are spotted flycatcher, fieldfare, goldfinch, marsh tit, jay, green woodpecker, great spotted woodpecker and lesser spotted woodpecker.

== Invertebrates ==
Recorded are common blue, small copper and marbled white butterflies. Dragonflies include azure damselfly and southern aeshna.

== Other interest ==
Turtle dove, reed bunting and sedge warbler breed in the adjoining Osier bed. Waterfowl may be viewed on the flood meadows.

== Conservation ==
The scrub management is balanced to maintain the grassy areas of the embankment but to ensure nesting areas for the bird life.

== Publications ==
- Kelham, A, Sanderson, J, Doe, J, Edgeley-Smith, M, et al., 1979, 1990, 2002 editions, 'Nature Reserves of the Gloucestershire Trust for Nature Conservation/Gloucestershire Wildlife Trust'
- 1981, revised 1985, 'Mythe Railway Nature Reserve', Gloucestershire Trust for Nature Conservation
- ‘Nature Reserve Guide – discover the wild Gloucestershire on your doorstep’ - 50th Anniversary, January 2011, Gloucestershire Wildlife Trust
