= Oxenton =

Village in England

Coordinates: 51.980846°N 2.0639736°W

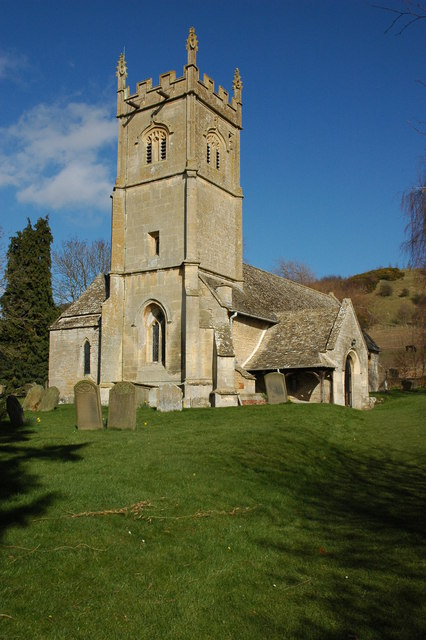

- Location within Gloucestershire
- Area: 7.719 km^{2} (2.980 sq mi)
- Population: 162 (2011 census)
  - Density: 21/km^{2} (54/sq mi)
- Civil parish: Oxenton
- District: Tewkesbury
- Shire county: Gloucestershire
- Region: South West
- Country: England
- Sovereign state: United Kingdom
- Police: Gloucestershire
- Fire: Gloucestershire
- Ambulance: South Western

Oxenton is a village and civil parish 11 miles (18 km) north east of Gloucester, in the Tewkesbury district, in the county of Gloucestershire, England. In 2011 the parish had a population of 162. The parish touches Alderton, Ashchurch Rural, Gotherington, Teddington and Stoke Orchard. It is on the west side of Oxenton Hill, a northern outlier of the Cotswolds. Oxenton has a parish meeting.

== Landmarks ==
There are 22 listed buildings in Oxenton. Oxenton has a church called St John the Baptist and a village hall.

== History ==
The name "Oxenton" means 'Ox hill'. Oxenton was recorded in the Domesday Book as Oxendone. On 1 April 1935 Woolstone parish was abolished and merged with Oxenton.
