= Alstone, Tewkesbury =

Village in Gloucestershire, England

Coordinates: 51.99005°N 2.02762°W

Alstone
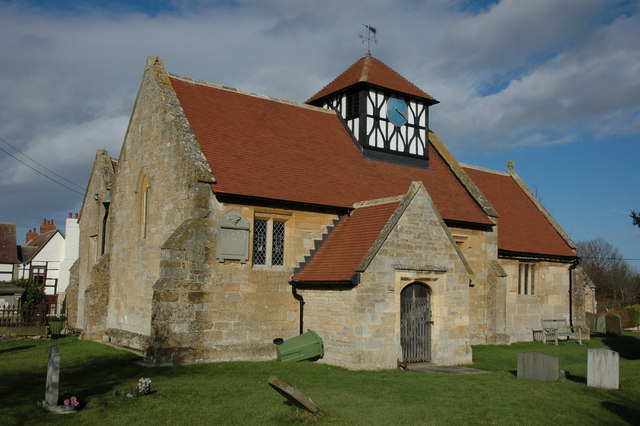
- Alstone Church

- Location within Gloucestershire
- Civil parish: Teddington
- District: Tewkesbury
- Shire county: Gloucestershire
- Region: South West
- Country: England
- Sovereign state: United Kingdom

Alstone is a village and former civil parish, now in the parish of Teddington, in the Tewkesbury district, in the county of Gloucestershire, England, situated between the towns of Tewkesbury and Winchcombe. In 1931 the parish had a population of 50.

Until 1844 Alstone was part of an exclave of the county of Worcestershire.

Alstone became a parish in 1866, on 1 April 1935 it was abolished and merged with Teddington.
