= Sudeley =

Civil parish in Gloucestershire, England)

Coordinates: 51.9248°N 1.9859°W

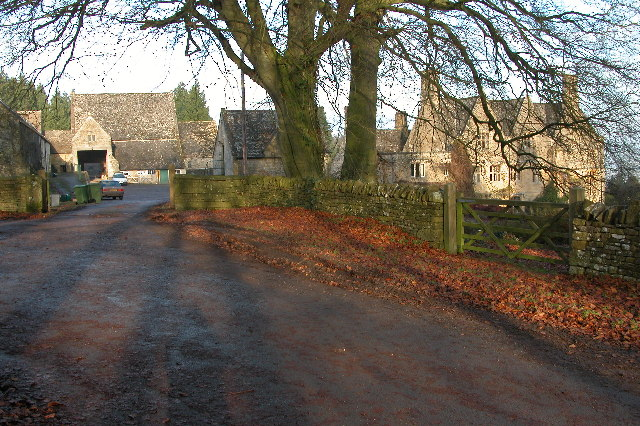

- Location within Gloucestershire
- Civil parish: Sudeley
- District: Tewkesbury
- Shire county: Gloucestershire
- Region: South West
- Country: England
- Sovereign state: United Kingdom
- Post town: Winchcombe
- Postcode district: GL54
- Police: Gloucestershire
- Fire: Gloucestershire
- Ambulance: South Western

Sudeley is a civil parish in the district of Tewkesbury, in the county of Gloucestershire, England. The parish includes the village of Charlton Abbots.

== History ==
The parish was formed on 1 April 1935 from the parishes of Charlton Abbots and Sudeley Manor and part of Sevenhampton. The name "Sudeley" means 'South wood/clearing' or perhaps, 'shed wood/clearing'. Sudeley was recorded in the Domesday Book as Sudlege.

== Places of interest ==
The parish is home to Sudeley Castle, a Grade I listed building.
