= Chaceley =

Village in Gloucestershire, England

Coordinates: 51.974169°N 2.2087843°W

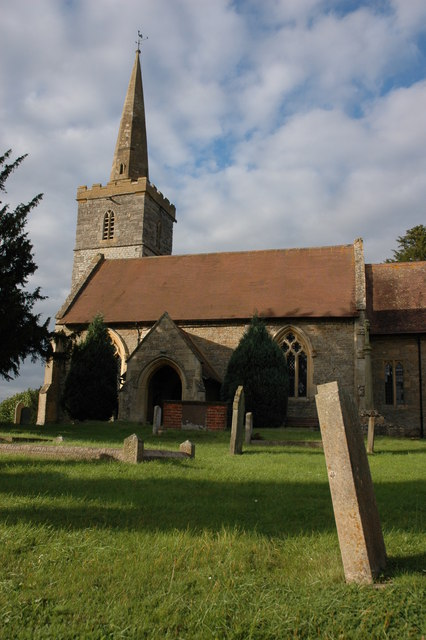

- Location within Gloucestershire
- Area: 6.703 km^{2} (2.588 sq mi)
- Population: 125 (2011 census)
  - Density: 19/km^{2} (49/sq mi)
- Civil parish: Chaceley
- District: Tewkesbury
- Shire county: Gloucestershire
- Region: South West
- Country: England
- Sovereign state: United Kingdom
- Police: Gloucestershire
- Fire: Gloucestershire
- Ambulance: South Western

Chaceley or Chaseley is a village and civil parish 8 miles (13 km) north of Gloucester, in the Tewkesbury district, in the county of Gloucestershire, England. In 2011 the parish had a population of 125. The parish touches Deerhurst, Eldersfield, Forthampton, Tewkesbury and Tirley.

== Etymology ==
The name Chaceley is first attested in a charter of 972 (surviving in an eleventh-century manuscript), as Ceatewesleah. From the Domesday Book of 1086, through the fourteenth century, the name appears in forms such as Chad(d)esleia and Chad(d)eslega. A closer precursor to the modern form is attested from 1185, as Chaseleia, with Chaseley appearing in the seventeenth century. The form Ched(d)eslega is also attested a couple of times, on one occasion datable to 1167.

Scholars agree that the last element of the name derives from the common Old English work lēah ("cleared land amidst woodland"). But the origin of the beginning of the name is uncertain. There has been speculation that it might derive from a personal name such as *Cēatwe, but recent commentators prefer the suggestion that the names derives from the Common Brittonic words that survive in modern Welsh as coed ("wood") and either a place-name-forming suffix ow or the noun yw ("yew"). Thus the name once meant "forest-place" or "yew-forest". No longer understood by Old English-speakers, it then became part of a new place-name meaning something like "cleared land at Cedow".

== History ==
On 1931 the parish was transferred from Worcestershire to Gloucestershire. On 1 April 1965 44 acres were transferred to Eldersfield parish.

== Landmarks ==
There are 20 listed buildings in Chaceley. Chaceley has a church called St John the Baptist and a village hall.
