= Woolstone, Gloucestershire =

Village in Gloucestershire, England

Coordinates: 51.9710°N 2.0567°W

Woolstone
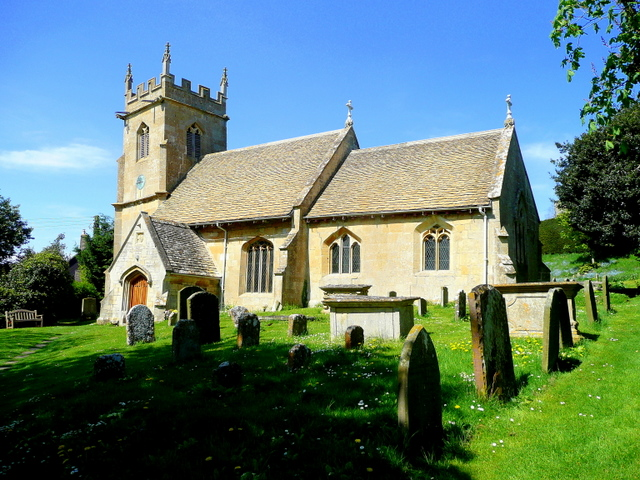
- Woolstone church

- Location within Gloucestershire
- Civil parish: Oxenton
- District: Tewkesbury
- Shire county: Gloucestershire
- Region: South West
- Country: England
- Sovereign state: United Kingdom
- Police: Gloucestershire
- Fire: Gloucestershire
- Ambulance: South Western

Woolstone is a village and former civil parish now in the parish of Oxenton, in the Tewkesbury district, in the county of Gloucestershire, England. It is about 5 miles (8 km) miles from the town of Cheltenham. The village is on the southern side of Crane Hill and on the north bank of the Tirle Brook. In 1931 the parish had a population of 85. Woolstone has a church called St Martin's Church which is grade II* listed.

== History ==
The name "Woolstone" means 'Wulfsige's farm/settlement'. Woolstone was recorded in the Domesday Book as Olsendone. On 1 April 1935 the parish was abolished and merged with Oxenton.
