= Stanway, Gloucestershire =

Village in Gloucestershire, England

Coordinates: 51.98992°N 1.914005°W

Stanway
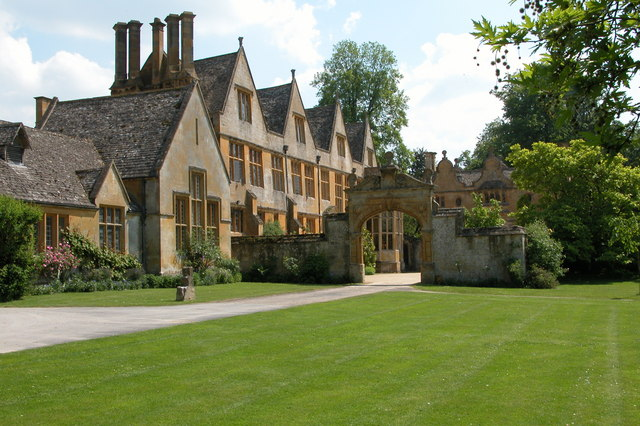
- Stanway House

- Location within Gloucestershire
- Population: 343
- Civil parish: Stanway
- District: Tewkesbury
- Shire county: Gloucestershire
- Region: South West
- Country: England
- Sovereign state: United Kingdom
- Post town: Cheltenham
- Postcode district: GL54
- Police: Gloucestershire
- Fire: Gloucestershire
- Ambulance: South Western

Stanway is a small village and civil parish in the county of Gloucestershire, England, and about 1 mile south of Stanton: both villages are on the Cotswold Way. The parish includes the villages of Didbrook, Hailes, Taddington and Wood Stanway. The population of the parish at the 2011 census was 343. It is part of the Tewkesbury Borough Council area.

The village is dominated by Stanway House, a Jacobean manor house, owned by the Earl of Wemyss and March, undergoing a long 21st century restoration.

The demesne estate has the single highest gravity-fed fountain in the UK at just over 300 feet. It was restored for operation in 2004 and can be seen from nearby hills when it spurts. Taddington to the east has the source of the Windrush.

The gate of Stanway House is the finish of the 1st Stage (and start of the 2nd Stage) of the Cotswold Way Relay race.

St Peter's Church was rebuilt in the 12th century, the tower added in the 13th century and the whole building thoroughly restored in 1896. The Tithe Barn was built in the 14th century for Tewkesbury Abbey. The bell tower contains a ring of five bells dating from (in order 1-5 wish founders) 2014 (Whitechapel, London) 1625 (Worcester Foundry, possibly James Keene), 1904 (Bond of Burford), 1826 (Rudhall, Gloucester) and 1634 (Unknown founder). They are hung for English Change Ringing and were restored in 2015. The largest (Tenor) bell is a maiden (untuned) bell and is listed for preservation. It weighs just over 11cwt.

Stanway War Memorial is south of the village against the B4077 road and the southernmost end of the Stanton Road. The bronze of St George and the Dragon is by Alexander Fisher, the stone column and plinth by Sir Philip Stott carved by Eric Gill. The war memorial in the church chancel is also by Fisher and Gill.

Stanway has a cricket pitch, a fenced ground, in the middle of a field. The field has an undulating surface, which was reportedly made uneven to make landing difficult for – possibly hypothetical – German gliders during the Second World War. The cricket ground – itself flat – possesses a pavilion, which is built on staddle stones, and was the gift of the author J. M. Barrie who stayed at Stanway House in the 1920s. It is famous lore among the area, that Barrie formed his own "literary cricket team", promising the club he would help pay for the pavilion if he took a hat-trick.

In 1993 the manor house reopened its brewery, one of only two coal-fired brewing houses in the country.

== Location ==
- Taddington is east of and higher than most of Stanway, in the parish.
- Wood Stanway lies a little less than a mile to the south of Stanway, on the other side of the B4077.

== Gallery ==
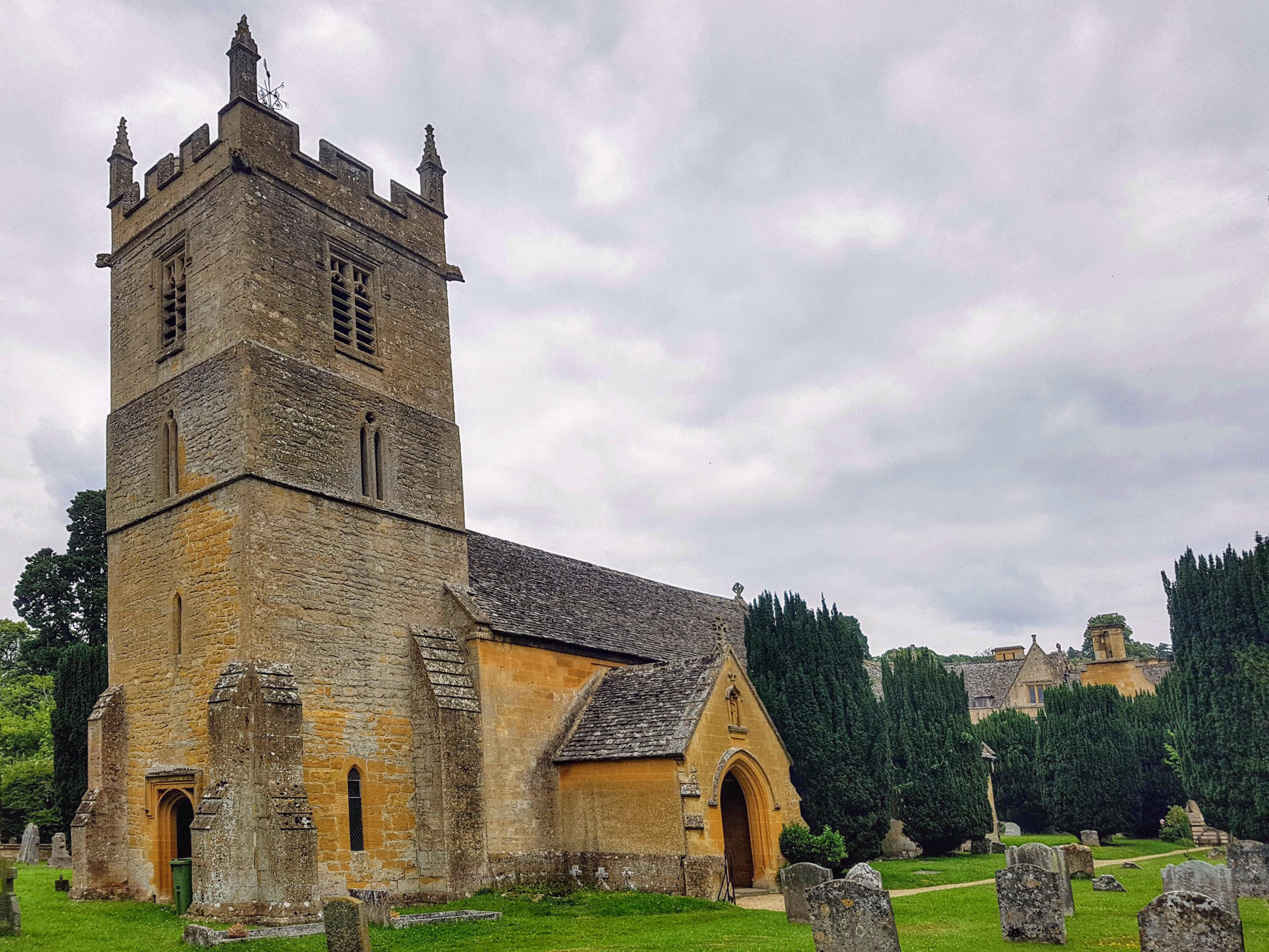
St Peter's Church

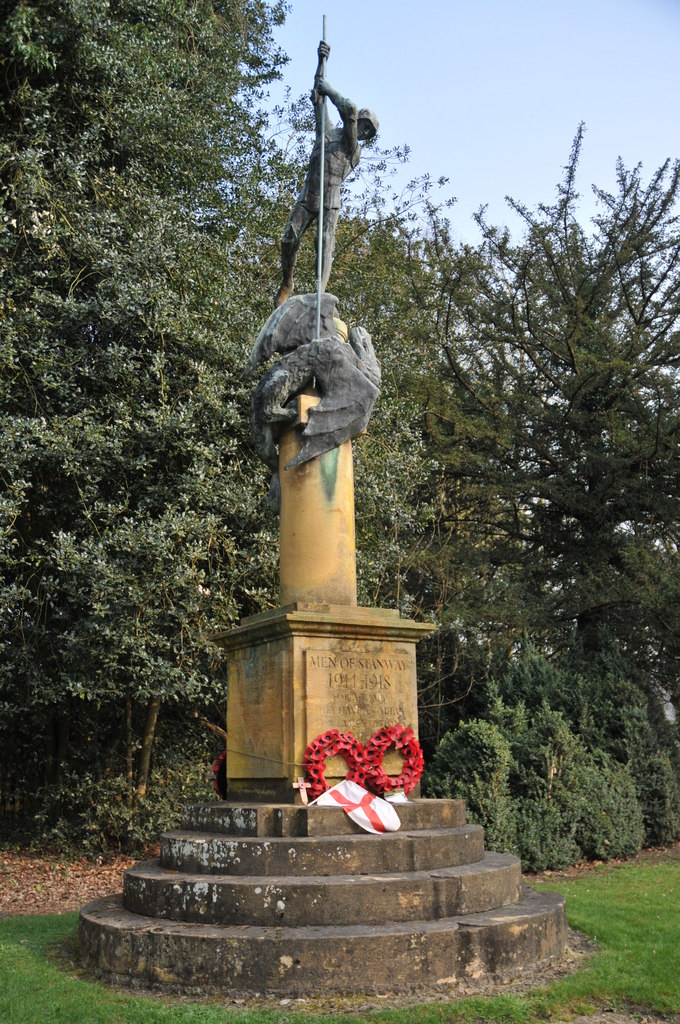
The war memorial

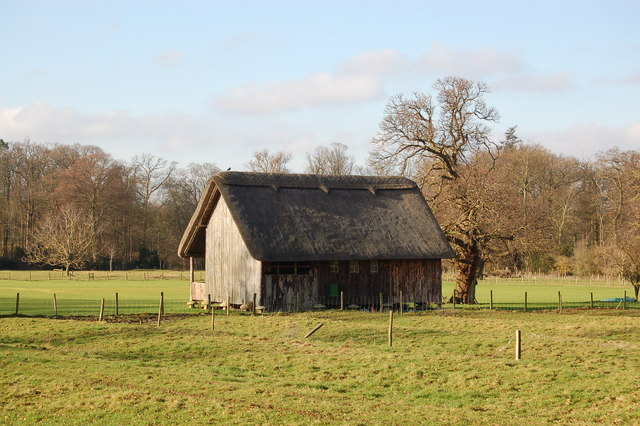
The J. M. Barrie cricket pavilion
