= Alexander Fisher (painter) =

English painter

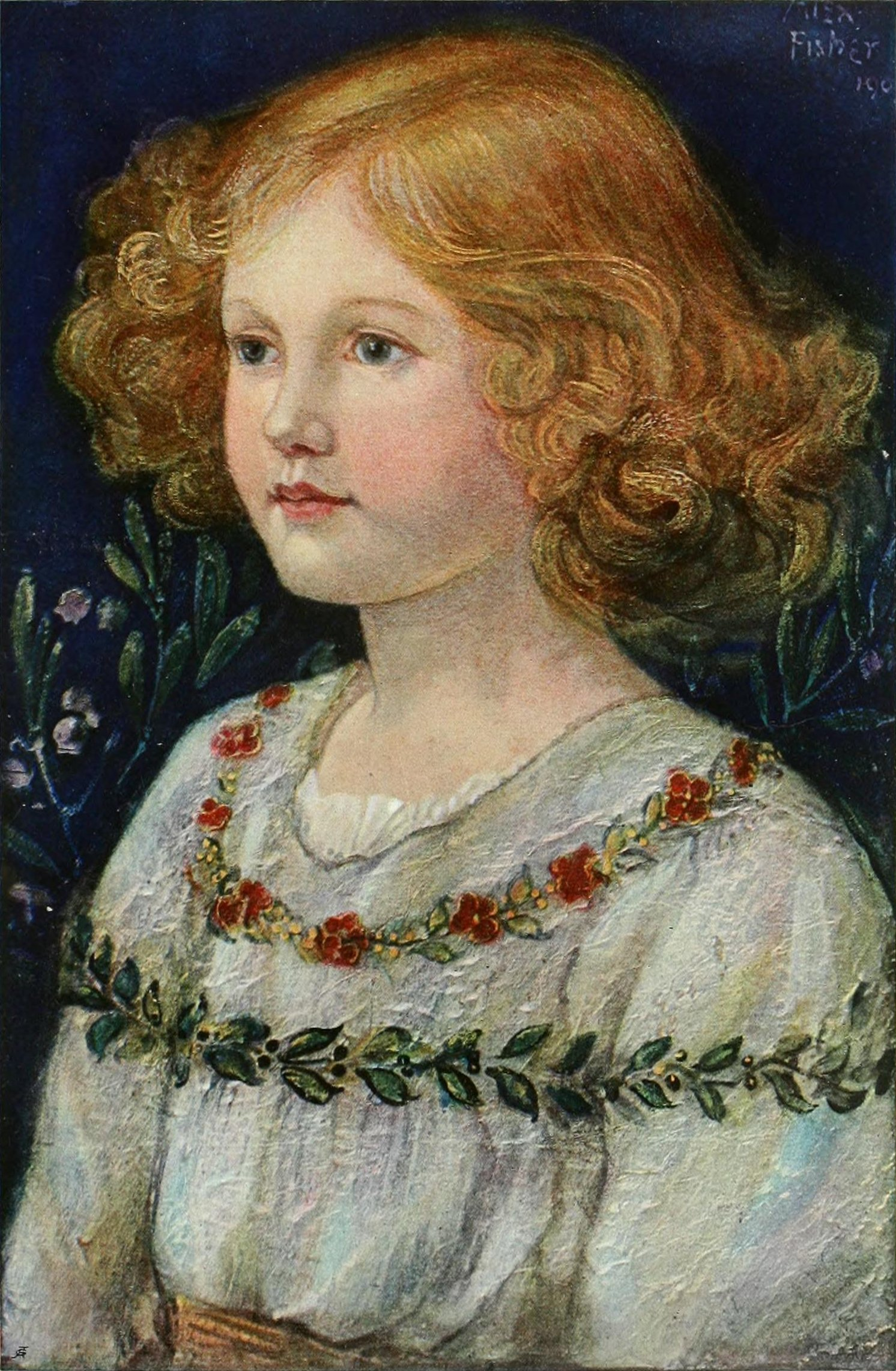
Enamel portrait of John Noble's daughter Rosemary

Alexander Fisher (1864 – 1936), was an English silversmith and painter active in the Arts and Crafts movement in London. He was a teacher at the Slade School of Art and wrote a book about enameling and the article on "Enamel" for the Encyclopædia Britannica. His book, The art of enamelling upon metal: with a short appendix concerning miniature painting on enamel was published in 1909.

== Biography ==
He was an enamelist reviving the methods of the Limoges school of enameling. He started as a painter and silversmith, but travelled to Limoges to learn enameling techniques. On his return, he set up a studio in London and took on pupils. Nelson Dawson, Ernestine Mills, and Oswald Reeves were among his pupils.

The Albert & Victoria Museum in London contains decorated objects and paintings by Fisher in its collection.

== Bibliography ==
- —— (1906). The art of enamelling upon metal: with a short appendix concerning miniature painting on enamel. The Studio.
