= Teddington, Gloucestershire =

Village in Gloucestershire, England

Coordinates: 51°59′45″N 2°3′10″W

Teddington
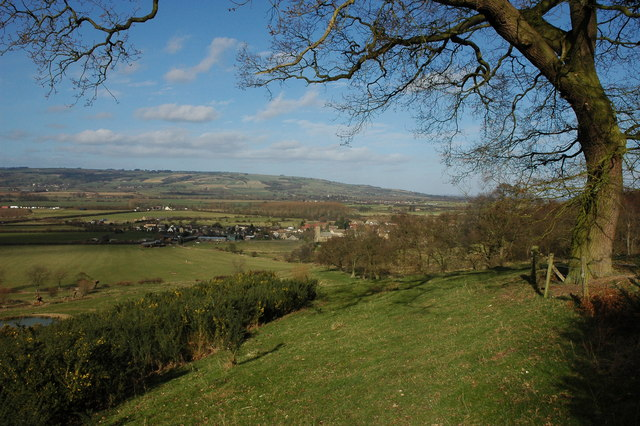
- Teddington viewed from near the Belt

- Location within Gloucestershire
- Population: 393 (2011 Census)
- District: Tewkesbury
- Shire county: Gloucestershire
- Region: South West
- Country: England
- Sovereign state: United Kingdom
- Post town: Tewkesbury
- Postcode district: GL20
- Police: Gloucestershire
- Fire: Gloucestershire
- Ambulance: South Western
- UK Parliament: Tewkesbury

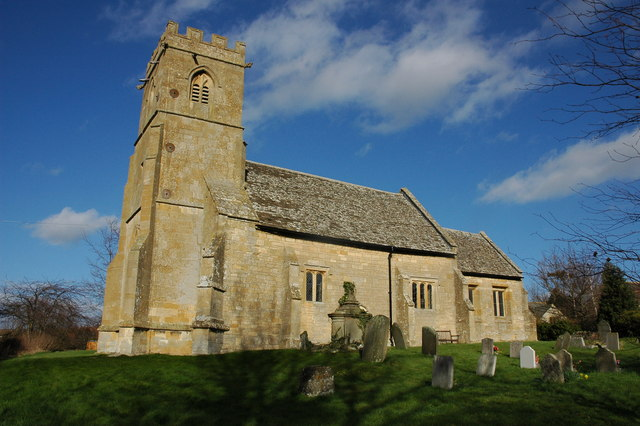
St Nicholas' Church in Teddington

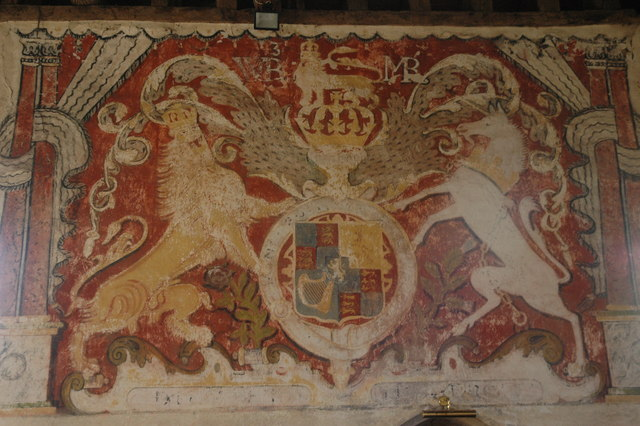
Mural of the Lion and the Unicorn in St Nicholas' Church, dating to 1689

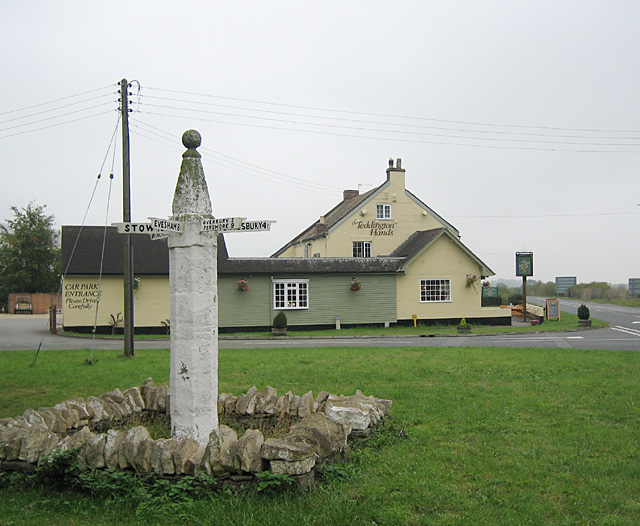
Teddington Hands, an ancient sign post pointing in six directions

Teddington is a village and parish in Gloucestershire, England.

== Population ==
The village had a population of less than 300, of which the majority were professional commuters and elderly pensioners. The population increased to 393 at the 2011 census. It has an archaic water pump, a village hall and some property dating from the 18th century and earlier. Nearby is the "Teddington Hands" pub, the name of which refers to the crossroads sign that was renovated as part of the 2000 Millennium celebrations. Opposite the pub and outside a Texaco service station is a standing stone of purportedly mystical significance and is believed to be over 2,000 years old.

== History ==
The village dates from the 8th century. The Teddington Hands Inn (nearby but not in the village) was originally known as the Cross Hands Inn and the name change only took place in the late 1980s after construction of the Teddington Hands Roundabout which realigned the Stow road away from the side of the premises due to a high volume of serious road traffic accidents. The area gets its name from the historic fingerpost which formerly stood at the crossroads but now stands adjacent to the entrance to the pub. The finger post is a listed structure.

During the Second World War an American military base was in the field to the rear of the pub and Joe Louis the heavyweight boxer fought an exhibition match in the field and all the surrounding villagers were invited. Glenn Miller also entertained troops in an adjacent field and visited the pub for refreshments prior to going to Cheltenham to perform a further concert. The following day he left from a nearby airfield for France. He and the plane he was travelling in was never seen again. The current theory being is small plane was hit by bombs discharged from returning allied bombers over the channel. So the Teddington Hands Inn is possibly the last pub Glenn Miller ever visited.

== Sights ==
The village has an ancient church that is thought to date from the 12th century. The interior wall has a partially faded mural of the Lion and the Unicorn that dates from the second half of the 17th century. It also contains an arch sourced from Hailes Abbey after the latter was destroyed following the dissolution of the monasteries.

== Surrounding area ==
The villages of Teddington and Alstone, separated by the tiny hamlet of Bengrove lie in gently rolling countryside near the foot of the Cotswold escarpment, almost equidistant from the towns of Cheltenham, Tewkesbury and Evesham. Each a distinct community but their proximity to each other and their small size, a combined adult population of almost 330, means that the people who live here join for social occasions and religious observances.

Teddington and Alstone now lie in the Anglican Diocese of Worcester, although they have been part of Gloucestershire since 1932, falling within the borough and Parliamentary constituency of Tewkesbury.

The existence of this parish began when the standing stone was founded and was thought to bring good-natured happenings and luck. Travellers came into the area looking to see the stone until there was a whole community of travellers and settlers. After a few years there were thriving businesses and schools worthy for education of children. Even today people moving house or coming into retirement like to travel to Teddington for its famous brews and the "mystical significance" of the standing stone.

== See also ==
- Taddington, Gloucestershire
- Toddington, Gloucestershire
