= Washburn =

Washburn or Washburne may refer to:

== Places ==
=== Canada ===
- Washburn, Ontario, a rural community

=== United States ===
- Washburn, Illinois, a village
- Washburn, Iowa, an unincorporated town and census-designated place
- Washburn, Maine, a town
  - Washburn (CDP), Maine, a census-designated place and village within the town
- Washburn, Missouri, a city
- Washburn, North Dakota, a city
- Washburn, Tennessee, an unincorporated community
- Washburn, Texas, an unincorporated community
- Washburn, West Virginia, an unincorporated community
- Washburn, Wisconsin, a city
- Washburn, Bayfield County, Wisconsin, a town adjacent to the city
- Washburn, Clark County, Wisconsin, a town
- Washburn County, Wisconsin

== Geographical features ==
=== England ===
- River Washburn, North Yorkshire, England

=== United States ===
- Mount Washburn, Yellowstone National Park, Wyoming
- Washburn Island, Massachusetts
- Washburn Lake, Minnesota

== Schools in the United States ==
- Washburn University, a liberal arts university in Topeka, Kansas
- Washburn Institute of Technology, formerly Kaw Area Technical School in Topeka, Kansas
- Washburn Rural High School, Topeka, Kansas
- Washburn High School, Minneapolis, Minnesota
- Washburn School, Washburn, Tennessee
- Washburn Preparatory School (1894–1911), San Jose, California
- Carleton W. Washburne Middle School, Winnetka, Illinois

== Other uses ==
- Washburn (surname)
- Washburn House (disambiguation), various places
- Washburne House, Galena, Illinois, on the National Register of Historic Places
- Washburne Historic District, Springfield, Oregon, United States
- Washburne State Wayside, Oregon
- Washburn Tunnel, in the suburbs of Houston, Texas, United States
- Washburn Field, Colorado Springs, Colorado, the stadium of Colorado College and the now-defunct Colorado Springs Blizzard soccer team
- USS Washburn (AKA-108), a United States Navy attack cargo ship
- Camp Washburn, on Washburn Island, Massachusetts, a World War II United States Army camp
- Washburn Guitars, a manufacturer of guitars
- Ives Washburn, Inc., an American publisher acquired by David McKay Publications

== See also ==
- Bank of Washburn, Washburn, Wisconsin, on the National Register of Historic Places
- Washbourne (disambiguation)
