= Monsell =

Monsell is a surname. Notable people with the surname include:

- Bolton Eyres-Monsell, 1st Viscount Monsell, GBE, PC (1881–1969), British Conservative Party politician, Chief Whip, First Lord of the Admiralty
- Elinor Mary Monsell (1871–1954), Irish born illustrator, engraver and portrait painter
- Graham Eyres-Monsell, 2nd Viscount Monsell (1905–1994), served in the Intelligence Corps during the World War II, becoming Lieutenant Colonel
- Harriet Monsell (1811–1883), founded the Community of St. John Baptist, an order of Augustinian nuns in the Church of England dedicated to social service
- J. R. Monsell (1877–1952), Irish illustrator
- John Samuel Bewley Monsell (1811–1875), Irish Anglican clergyman and poet
- Talbert Monsell Forrest (1923–1999), Jamaican politician
- William Monsell, 1st Baron Emly PC (1812–1894), Anglo-Irish landowner and Liberal politician

== See also ==
- Eyres Monsell, southern suburb of the city of Leicester, England
- Viscount Monsell, of Leicester in the County of Leicester, a title in the Peerage of the United Kingdom
- Monsell, Ontario in the Muskoka District Municipality in Ontario, Canada
- Monascella
- Moonspell
- Moselle
