= Winchcombe Rural District =

Former local government area in the UK

Coordinates: 51.953°N 1.968°W

Winchcombe
- Area
  - 1911: 55,259 acres (223.63 km^{2})
  - 1931: 54,742 acres (221.53 km^{2})
- Population
  - 1901: 8,709
  - 1931: 8,334
- History
  - Created: 1894
  - Abolished: 1935
  - Succeeded by: Cheltenham Rural District, North Cotswold Rural District
- Status: Rural district
  - HQ: Winchcombe

Winchcombe was, from 1894 to 1935, a rural district in the Cotswolds area of England. It included parts of two administrative counties: Gloucestershire and Worcestershire.

== Formation ==
The rural district was created by the Local Government Act 1894 as the successor to the Winchcombe Rural Sanitary District. The rural district was governed by a directly elected rural district council (RDC), which replaced the rural sanitary authority that had comprised the poor law guardians for the area.

== Parishes ==
The district consisted of twenty-nine civil parishes. Twenty-eight parishes were in Gloucestershire, while the parish of Cutsdean was a detached part of Worcestershire. In 1931 the county boundaries were altered and Cutsdean was transferred to Gloucestershire. However another parish in the rural district, Beckford, was transferred from Gloucestershire to Worcestershire at the same time. Two years later Beckford was transferred back to Worcestershire and to Evesham Rural District.

The following parishes were in the district:

- Alderton
- Alstone
- Beckford (until 1931)
- Bishop's Cleeve
- Buckland
- Charlton Abbots
- Cutsdean
- Didbrook
- Dumbleton
- Gotherington
- Great Washbourne
- Guiting Power
- Hailes
- Hawling
- Little Washbourne
- Pinnock and Hyde
- Prescott
- Roel
- Snowshill
- Southam and Brockhampton
- Stanley Pontlarge
- Stanton
- Stanway
- Sudeley Manor
- Temple Guiting
- Toddington
- Winchcombe
- Woodmancote
- Wormington

== Abolition ==
Under the Local Government Act 1929 county councils were given the duty of reviewing the districts within their county. The County of Gloucester Review Order 1935 came into effect on 1 April 1935, and led to the abolition of a number of small urban and rural districts in the county. Winchcombe Rural District was dissolved, with its area redistributed between Cheltenham Rural District and a new North Cotswold Rural District.
