= Alderton, Gloucestershire =

Village in Gloucestershire, England

Coordinates: 51.998°N 1.999°W

Alderton
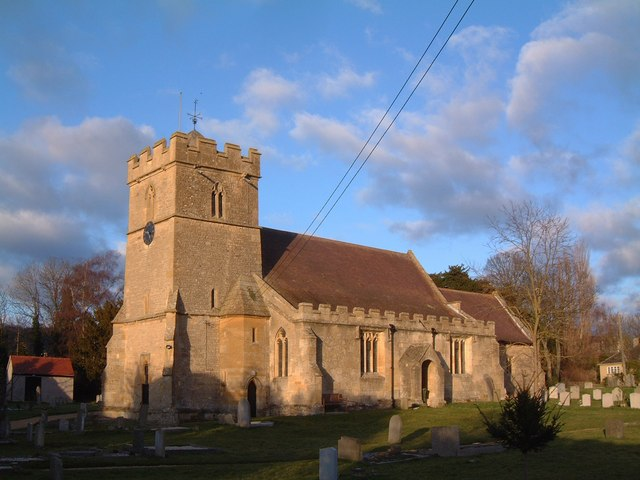
- St Margaret's parish church

- Location within Gloucestershire
- Population: 747 (2011)
- OS grid reference: SP001332
- Civil parish: Alderton
- District: Tewkesbury
- Shire county: Gloucestershire
- Region: South West
- Country: England
- Sovereign state: United Kingdom
- Post town: Tewkesbury
- Postcode district: GL20
- Dialling code: 01242 62
- Police: Gloucestershire
- Fire: Gloucestershire
- Ambulance: South Western
- UK Parliament: Tewkesbury
- Website: Alderton Village

Alderton is a village and civil parish in the Tewkesbury district of Gloucestershire, England.

The village is about 15 miles (24 km) north of Cheltenham, 6 miles (10 km) east of Tewkesbury, 7.5 miles (12 km) south of Evesham and 15 miles (24 km) west of Stow-on-the-Wold. The main roads are the B4077 (Stow Road) and the A46.

The parish has 1,170 residents.

== Etymology ==
Alderton is listed in the Domesday Book as Aldritone meaning the tun of Ealdhere's people.

== Church and chapel ==
The Church of England parish church of St Margaret of Antioch may originate from the Anglo-Saxon era. The current building is mostly 14th century and was restored in 1890–92. St Margaret's ecclesiastical parish forms part of the Alderton benefice that incorporates the nearby villages of Dumbleton, Little Washbourne and Great Washbourne. The benefice is administered from St Peter's church, Winchcombe.

Alderton Methodist chapel was built in 1899. It is now a private house.

== Neighbourhoods ==
=== Alderton Fields ===
Alderton parish includes the satellite settlement of Alderton Fields, which is conjoined with Gretton Fields, Gretton. The distinctiveness of Alderton Fields, as a separate entity to Gretton Fields, was the subject of controversy when in the early 2000s, a road sign declared the whole area to be named Gretton Fields. The sign has since been moved to the Gretton parish boundary, and a new sign for Alderton Fields erected.

=== Oak Hill ===
The name of the hill between Alderton and Dumbleton is the subject of local rivalry. There are three peaks to the hill, which are distinctively and separately named Dumbleton Hill, Alderton Hill and Oak Hill on Ordnance Survey maps. To avoid controversy, the local primary school - which has two sites, one each in Alderton and Dumbleton - took the name Oak Hill. However, local residents will use the three names Oak Hill, Dumbleton Hill and Alderton Hill interchangeably to refer to the same hill, rather than the individual peaks.

== Facilities ==
The village has the Gardners Arms pub, a local garage and petrol station, and a village shop that includes a post office. There is also the Junior campus of Oak Hill Primary School - the Infant campus being in nearby Dumbleton. There is a number of pubs in the outlying areas around the village, including the Hobnails Inn at Little Washbourne. A milkman continues to provide doorstep delivery of dairy and bakery goods on certain days of the week - including milk sourced locally from dairy farms in the parish (although pasteurisation occurs at the Cotteswold Dairy plant in Tewkesbury).

Most of the residents are either retired or commute to jobs in nearby Tewkesbury, Cheltenham or Evesham. A small number of people work in farming: there is a large dairy farm in the parish, plus sheep and wheat farming. Others work in tourism: there are several bed and breakfast guest houses, and a number of houses available as holiday lets. The Winchcombe Camping and Caravanning Club has a large campsite on the B4077 near Gretton.

There is a free public WiFi hotspot provided from nearby Frampton Cottages. ADSL broadband is available throughout the parish.

In December 2006 a book documenting life in the village, along with some of its history, was published. The book was featured in the April 2007 edition of Country Life.

== Architecture and environment ==
Lying on the edge of both the Cotswolds and the Vale of Evesham, the village incorporates both Cotswold stone and red brick architecture, in addition to wattle and daub half-timbered thatched buildings, plus more modern houses and bungalows with Cotswold stone cladding. There are also a small number of council houses with white pebbledash. Several houses in the outlying areas of the parish are built in a Victorian style using local red brick manufactured from a now-disused clay mine on the top of the nearby Oak Hill (also called Dumbleton Hill or Alderton Hill); these were originally constructed as farmworkers' cottages for the Dumbleton Hall estate (Dumbleton Hall itself is now a hotel).

A footpath system connects the village over the wooded Oak Hill to the nearby village of Dumbleton. These footpaths are known locally as "The Dungeons" due to the deep channel that they cut into the hillside and the darkness of overhanging trees. Oak Hill itself remains a managed estate, with organised game bird shooting and rearing of deer for sale to other game estates. A number of gamekeepers ensure public safety by directing ramblers to keep to marked footpaths.

== Sources ==
- Elrington, C.R., ed. (1965). "Parishes: Alderton with Dixton". A History of the County of Gloucester, Volume 6. Victoria County History. pp. 189–197.
- Verey, David (1970). Gloucestershire: The Vale and the Forest of Dean. The Buildings of England. Vol. 2. Harmondsworth: Penguin Books. pp. 80–81.
