= Washbourne =

Washbourne or Washbourn may refer to:

== People ==
- Enga Washbourn (1908–1988), New Zealand artist and writer
- Richard Washbourn (1910–1988), New Zealand naval officer, brother of Enga
- Mona Washbourne (1903-1988), English actress
- Thomas Washbourne (1606-1687), English clergyman and poet

== Places ==
- Washbourne, Devon, England, a hamlet

== See also ==
- Great Washbourne, Gloucestershire, England, a village
- Little Washbourne, Gloucestershire, England, a village
- Washburn (disambiguation)
