= Washburn (surname) =

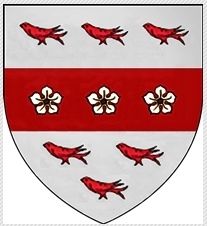
Arms of the Washbourne family of Washbourne & Wichenford" - "Argent on a fess between six martlets gules three cinquefoils of the field" (Papworth's Armorials)

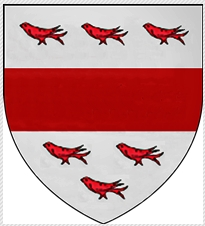
Arms of Sir John Washborne of Washbourne, Bretforton & Orleton in Estham (formally of Dufford) - "Argent a fess between six martlets gules" (Burke's General Armory)

Washburn (alternatively Wasseburne, Wasseborne, Wasshebourne, Wassheborne, Washbourne, Washburne, Washborne, Washborn, Wasborn, Washbon) is a toponymic surname, probably of Old English origin, with likely Anglo-Norman and Norman-French influences after the Conquest, as the name evolved.

== Origins ==
=== Worcestershire and Gloucestershire ===
This family, of Norman origin, can be traced through the lands in Worcestershire and Gloucestershire, namely the little hams of "Little Washbourne" and "Great Washbourne". Little Washbourne, historically in the parish of Overbury, and the manor thereon, eventually becoming known as "Wasseburne Militis" or "Knyghtes Wasshebourne", for the many from this line that bore that honour.

In the Herald's College, London, Vol. I., page 54, is given: Washbourne. "A name of ancient Norman descent; the founder was knighted on the field of battle by William the Conqueror and endowed with the lands of Little Washbourne and Great Washbourne, Counties of Gloucester and Worcester".

The name may have come from the Saxon for "from the flooding brook," with "wash" meaning "swift moving current of a stream," and "burn" referring to a brook or a small stream. It may have originated from the River Isbourne, which flowed near Little and Great Washbourne.

The surname has several origins in England:

- from Waseborne in Devon, a small settlement on the River Wash, a tributary of the River Dart
- from Washbourne in Gloucestershire, now known as Great Washbourne, or its neighbour Little Washbourne (now in Gloucestershire but formerly in Worcestershire)
- from the River Washburn in Yorkshire, i.e., referring to someone living on the banks of the river.

=== The Washburn name and variations ===
The name was anciently "Wasseburn" or "-born". C. W. Bardsley's Dictionary of English and Welsh Surnames states that "Wasse" was anciently and still is a common surname in Yorkshire. It is a place name derived from the various river and sea beaches subject to overflow by floods and tides, hence known as wasses and now as cashes. "Wasseburn" signified a flowing stream. The little ham that stood upon its banks took its name from the stream, and the proprietor or lord of the village was so and so de Wasseborn, just as the parson was the most important person in the parish. The form "Wasseborn" is the form first met with about 1100; and "Wasseborn" or "-burn" continued in common use by the family with the occasional addition of a final "e" until about the middle of the 17th century when the family wrote the name "Washbourne", a form which still prevails in England.

Through all the first two periods, writers of public documents, even of wills, felt themselves at liberty to suit their own convenience or taste in spelling the name, so that great varieties of spelling are found in public documents and varieties in the same document. Thus in the will of John Washburn of Bengeworth, it is "Wassheburns"; in his wife's "Wasborn"; in his son's "Wasburne" and in the inventory "Wasborne"; in the burgess' will "Washborne"; in his wife's "Wasburne" and "Washborne"; in the public registers of Bengeworth pretty uniformly "Wasborne". John the emigrant wrote his name "Washborn". In America three forms of spelling have prevailed – the most common "Washburn", "Washborn", and "Washburne", with even a greater variety of spelling of the name than is found in England, and not always by outsiders.

=== The Family seated at Little Wasseborne ===
Early writer's suggested that the first to use the name, was Sir Roger d'Wasseburne, ancestor of the American immigrant Washburns' of Plymouth Colony.

Washbourne Manor at Little Washbourne, was the ancient seat of the family, shown in Doomsday for that of Urse d'Abitot, and later held by "William son of Samson", in the time of Henry II (1154–1189). In 1280, Sir Roger d'Wasseburne paid a subsidy of 15s at Washbourne. Roger is shown as "of Washbourne, Little Comberton and of Stanford". His son Sir John d'Wasseburne, is recorded as "of Washbourne, Bretforton & Orleton in Estham". This Roger and John of the 1200s, are suggested as having been the first to use the surname, but this may not be correct.

Descendant in the male line of the "Knights Washbourne", the first American colonist of the family, being that of John Washborn (Sr.), b. 1597 in Bengeworth, England, came to Plymouth Colony in c. 1631. His son, John Washburn (Jr.), b. 1620, also in Bengeworth, sailed to New England in 1635 on the Elizabeth & Ann, with his mother Margery and brother Phillip. He married in 1645, Elizabeth Mitchell, daughter of Experience and Jane (Cooke) Mitchell, of Duxbury, Plymouth Colony. She was the granddaughter of Francis Cooke, who came to America on the Mayflower. They settled first in Duxbury and had eleven children, including the first notable set of Seven Brothers in the American Washburn line. It has been suggested that a likely 90% of the American Washburns hail from one of these "Seven Brothers".

Another contributor to the American Washburn line, a younger brother of John Sr., William Washburne, the immigrant ancestor to Connecticut Colony, and later Hempstead, Long Island, did not join his brother John Washburn in Plymouth Colony. He remained in England, where he raised a large family, and finally sailed with his in-laws to New England. They settled first in Stratford, Connecticut Colony, with the Nichols', eventually settling in Hempstead. He and his wife, Jane Nichols, had 9 or 10 children.

According to the 2000 U.S. Census, there were 19,505 Washburns in the United States, making it the 1,685th most common name in the country. There are also a number of Washburns in Canada, many of whom are descendants of United Empire Loyalist Ebenezer Washburn.

== Coat of arms ==
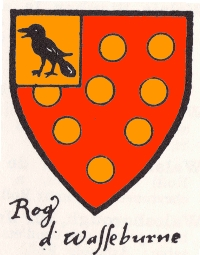
Arms of Sir Roger d'Wasseburne - "Gules bezantée on a canton or a raven sable" - (Joseph Foster)

=== "Gules bezantée on a canton or a raven sable" ===
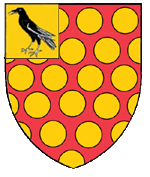
The first coat of arms met with for this family were recorded in the St George's Roll, c. 1285 for Sir Roger d'Wasseburne. The blazon, "Gules bezantée on a canton or a raven sable", suggested to early writers a familial connection to the Houses of la Zouche ("Gules bezantée") and le Corbet ("Or a raven sable"), but this connection has yet to be corroborated. It is possible that these arms were borne, rather, in feudal homage to these Houses, but again, this possibility is conjecture. The later recording of these same arms is shown here, by Joseph Foster in 1902, and suggests a slightly different blazon, "Gules ten bezants 4, 3, 2, 1" for la Zouche. This is actually a very common variation in heraldry and is noted so in the description of the arms on the page for Zouche.

=== "Gules bezantée on a canton or a cross sable" ===
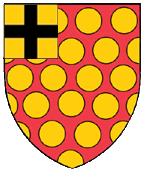
Another coat of arms as shown in Burkes General Armory for "Washborne" – "Gules bezantée on a canton or a cross sable". The specific Washborne family member that bore these arms is, as yet unknown.

=== "Argent a fess between six martlets gules" ===
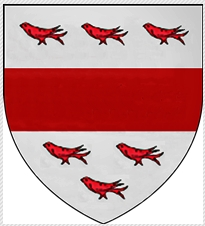
When the vast estates that Urse d'Abitot had accumulated were usurped from his son Roger, a substantial portion of the same, including the lands of Little Washbourne, were ultimately bestowed upon his sister's husband, Sir Walter Beauchamp of Elmley. The Washbourne family that resided at Little Washbourne thereafter, did so as under-tenants to their now over-lords, the Beauchamps of Elmley Castle. The arms for this branch of Beauchamps' were "Gules a fess between six martlets or", as shown next.

Sir John d'Wasseburne, formally of Dufford, son of Sir Roger, is the first Washbourne to be suggested as having borne the Beauchamp "a fess between six martlets" arms, changing the tincture's to the Washbourne colors of Argent and Gules as shown.

=== "Gules a fess between six martlets or" ===
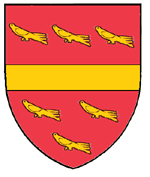
The arms for Sir Walter Beauchamp of Elmley Castle, bore a red shield with gold fess and martlets, and the Washbournes' bore a silver shield with red charges, as shown above. This feudal homage was also borne by and recorded for several other families. Members of the Wysham, Walshe, Waleys, Burdett, Blount, Cardiff and other families, all bore these "fess between six martlets" arms, in differing tinctures. All of these other families are recorded as marrying into the Beauchamp family.

=== "On a fess between six martlets three quatrefoils slipped sideways" ===
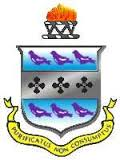
Washburn College in Topeka, Kansas, adopted a variation of the Washbourne Arms, using creative license to alter the tinctures (colors), to its school's colors, and used it as its own logo. The college, originally chartered as "Lincoln College", changed its name to "Washburn College", after a substantial pledge was received from Massachusetts Industrialist Ichabod Washburn. Since becoming "Washburn University", the school has abandoned the Washburn Arms logo. They're now using a stylized "W" in its place. The school mascot "The Ichabod", is still in use.

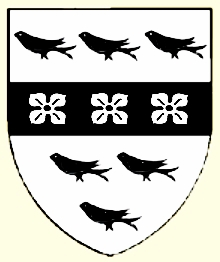
Arms of Anthony Washeborne of Bosbury - "Arg. on a fess between six martlets Sa. three quatre-foils of the field" - (Per the 1569 Visitation of Herefordshire for Washeborne)

=== "Argent on a fess between six martlets sable three quatrefoils of the field" ===
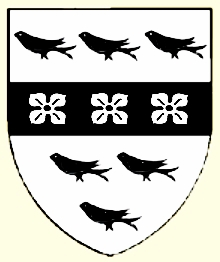
These Arms have been attributed to Anthony Washeborne of Bosbury, in Herefordshire. It is generally accepted that it was he who commissioned the Visitation on which these arms are blazoned. Differenced both in tincture (sable instead of gules), and the charges on the fess, from those showing "quatrefoils slipped sideways" or the "cinquefoils of the field" varieties.

=== "Argent on a fess between six martlets gules three cinquefoils of the field" ===
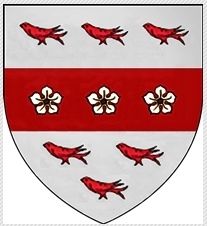
These are the Arms shown in the Chancel Tomb at St. Laurence Church in Wichenford, for John Washborne Esquire, Sheriff of Worcestershire, who had married both Mary Savage and Eleanor Lygon, and for his father Anthony Washborne Esquire of Wichenford Court. This main branch of the family were usually styled "of Washbourne and Wichenford", and the direct male line ceased with William Washbourne, Esq., of Wichenford and Pytchley. These Arms are the same as those uncovered from the old St. Peters (Evesham Abbey c. 1400s), and also as recorded in Papworth's Armorials and Burke's General Armory.

== Monuments at St. Laurence Church, Wichenford ==
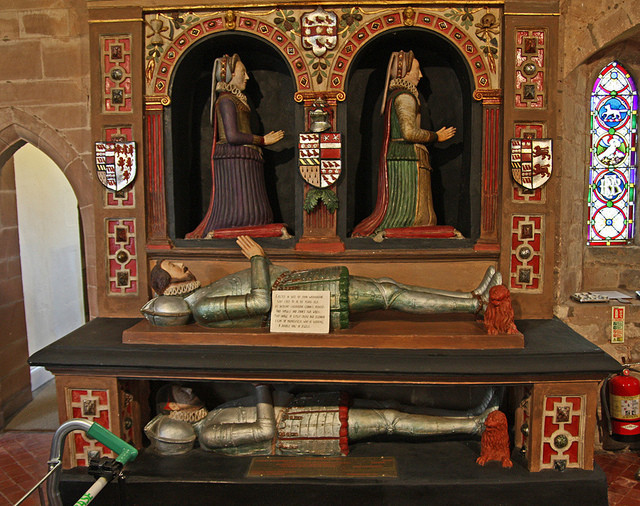
Washbourne monument at St Laurence's Wichenford

On the north side of the chancel is an altar tomb with two effigies in 17th-century armour, one on the slab and one beneath it. Behind are two female figures kneeling in recesses, with a classic cornice and ornament above crudely coloured and gilt. An inscription records that John Washbourne at the age of eighty-four built the monument for himself (the upper figure), his two wives Mary Savage and Eleanor Lygon, and his father Anthony (the lower figure).

There are four shields, the centre and highest one of the Washbourne arms. Below this is a shield quarterly of Washbourne quartered with Poer and Dabitot. To the west is a shield of these arms impaling the six lions of Savage. To the east is the same impaling the two lions passant of Lygon.

Thomas Habington gives us an early 1600s description of both monuments:

“In the North side of the chancel is an ancient tomb of alabaster on the ground. Upon it was delineated a man armed, all but his head, under which lyeth his helmet with a wreath and thereon a flame of fire; at his feet a lion. On his right hand his wife with a little dog at her feet. Between them the Washbourne’s arms impaling a chevron.

The inscription on the edge face of the stone:

"Hic jacunt Corpora Johannis Washbourne .... Armigeri .... & Margeriae Powere uxoris sua. Necnon et Elizabeth uxoris ....* ... ... de Bradley in Com. Derbia qui obiit 13 Mai 1454"

This tomb sheweth the match of Washborn with Poher’s co-heiress, which brought the name of Washbourne first into Wichenford.”

“On the south side of the chancel there is another monument of alabaster on the ground also in the same Fashion, a man armed as before with the wife on the right hand; the arms much defaced but still so discernable as to shew the arms of the Washbournes

The inscription:

"Hic iacet Johannies Washborne Armr filius et Hieres Normanni Washborne Armigeri, qui quidem filius obiit die mensis AD ****"

== People with the surname Washburn ==
- Abigail Washburn (born 1977), clawhammer banjo player and singer
- Anne Washburn, 21st century American playwright
- Barbara Washburn (1914–2014), first woman to climb Denali, the tallest mountain in North America; wife of Bradford
- Beverly Washburn (born 1943), actress
- Bradford Washburn (1910–2007), explorer, mountaineer, photographer, cartographer, and director of the Boston Museum of Science (1939–1980); husband of Barbara
- Cadwallader C. Washburn (1818–1882), son of Israel Washburn; U.S. representative from Wisconsin (2nd District 1855–61, 6th District 1867–71); general in the Union Army during the Civil War; governor of Wisconsin (1872–74)
- Carolyn Washburn, newspaper editor and journalist
- Cephas Washburn (1793–1860), noted Christian missionary and educator who worked with the Native Americans; father of Edward Washburn
- Charles Ames Washburn (1822–1889), son of Israel Washburn; presidential elector for California, 1860; U.S. diplomatic commissioner to Paraguay (1861–63); U.S. minister to Paraguay, 1863–68; novelist; invented an early typewriter
- Charles Grenfill Washburn (1857–1928), Member of Massachusetts House of Representatives (1897–98); member of Massachusetts Senate (1899–1900); U.S. representative from Massachusetts (3rd District, 1906–11)
- Chris Washburn (born 1966), American retired National Basketball Association player
- Claude Carlos Washburn (1883–1926) American writer
- Deric Washburn (born 1937), screenwriter
- Diane Washburn (born 1932), former fashion model
- Ebenezer Washburn (1756–1826), businessman and political figure in Upper Canada; member of the Legislative Assembly of Upper Canada
- Edward Washburn (1831–1860), artist; son of Cephas Washburn
- Elihu B. Washburne (1816–1887), "Watchdog of the Treasury"; son of Israel Washburn; U.S. Representative from Illinois, 1853–69 (1st District 1853–63, 3rd District 1863–69); U.S. Secretary of State, 1869; U.S. Minister to France, 1869–77; candidate for Republican nomination for president, 1880; candidate for Republican nomination for vice president, 1880
- Emory Washburn (1800–1877), Massachusetts state representative (1826–28), state senator (1841–42) and governor (1854–55); professor at Harvard Law School
- F. L. Washburn (1860–1927), zoology professor and State Entomologist of Minnesota
- George Washburn (1833–1915), missionary and educator; president of Robert College
- George Washburn (1914–1979), Major League Baseball player
- Hempstead Washburne (1852–1918), Mayor of Chicago, Illinois (1891–93)
- Henry D. Washburn (1832–1871), Union Army general during the Civil War; U.S. Representative from Indiana (7th District, 1866–69); as Surveyor-General of Montana Territory in 1870, led the Washburn Expedition into what is now Yellowstone National Park
- Ichabod Washburn (1798–1868), owner of the world's largest wire mill, the Washburn and Moen Manufacturing Company; co-founder of the Worcester Polytechnic Institute (1865)
- Israel Washburn (1784–1876), father of Israel Washburn Jr., Elihu Benjamin, Charles Ames, and William D. Washburn; member of the Massachusetts House of Representatives (1815–16, 1818–19)
- Israel Washburn, Jr. (1813–1883), son of Israel Washburn; brother of Elihu Benjamin, Cadwallader Colden, Charles Ames and William D. Washburn; Member of Maine House of Representatives (1842); U.S. representative from Maine (6th District 1851–53, 5th District 1853–61); governor of Maine (1861–63)
- James R. Washburn (1921–2007), member of the Illinois House of Representatives; mayor of Morris, Illinois
- Jarrod Washburn (born 1974), Major League Baseball pitcher
- Lalomie Washburn (1941–2004), R&B singer
- Lemuel K. Washburn (1846–1927), American Freethought writer and atheist
- Lucy Washburn (1848–1939), high school education pioneer
- Margaret Floy Washburn (1871–1939), first woman to receive a doctorate in psychology; professor
- Marion Foster Washburne (1863-1944), American author, lecturer, educator
- Mary Washburn (1907–1994), athlete
- Peter Thacher Washburn (1814–1870), governor of Vermont (1869–70)
- Phoebe Washburn (born 1973), installation artist
- Ray Washburn (born 1938), Major League Baseball pitcher
- Steve Washburn (born 1975), ice hockey player
- Ted Washburn (born 1941), politician, member of the Montana House of Representatives
- William B. Washburn (1820–1887), U.S. Representative from Massachusetts 9th District, (1863–71); governor of Massachusetts (1872–74); U.S. senator from Massachusetts (1874–75)
- William D. Washburn (1831–1912), son of Israel Washburn; father of William Drew Washburn Jr.; Member of Minnesota House of Representatives (1861); U.S. representative from Minnesota (3rd District 1879–83, 4th District 1883–85); U.S. senator from Minnesota (1889–95)
- William Drew Washburn Jr. (1863–1929), American politician and businessman

== People with the surname Washburne ==
- Ben Washburne (born 2001), American Paralympic rower
- Carleton Washburne (1889–1968), American educator
- Elihu B. Washburne (1816–1887), American politician
- Hempstead Washburne (1852–1918), American politician
- Ray Washburne (born 1960), American businessman and political fundraiser
- Thomas Washburne (born c. 1963), American politician

== Fictional characters ==
- Dr. Geoffrey Washburn, in the novel The Bourne Identity
- Hoban "Wash" Washburne, in the Joss Whedon science fiction series Firefly
- Marcellus Washburn, in the 1962 film The Music Man

== See also ==
- Washbourne (disambiguation)

== Sources ==
- Papworth's Ordinary of British Armorials, by John Woody Papworth, 1820–1870; Morant, Alfred William Whitehead, 1828–1881, ed, p. 809
- Burke: The General Armory of England, Scotland, Ireland and Wales, by Sir Bernard Burke, Harrison, London, 1884, p. 1080
- Joseph Foster – Some Feudal Coats of Arms, J. Parker Oxford & Co., 1902
- Herald's College, London, Vol. I., page 54, Washbourne.
- Bardsley: C. W. Bardsley's Dictionary of English and Welsh Surnames, p. 795
- Ebenezer Washburn: His Ancestors and Descendants, by Geo. T. Washburn (a family story of 700 years)
- Political Graveyard
