= Thomas Washbourne =

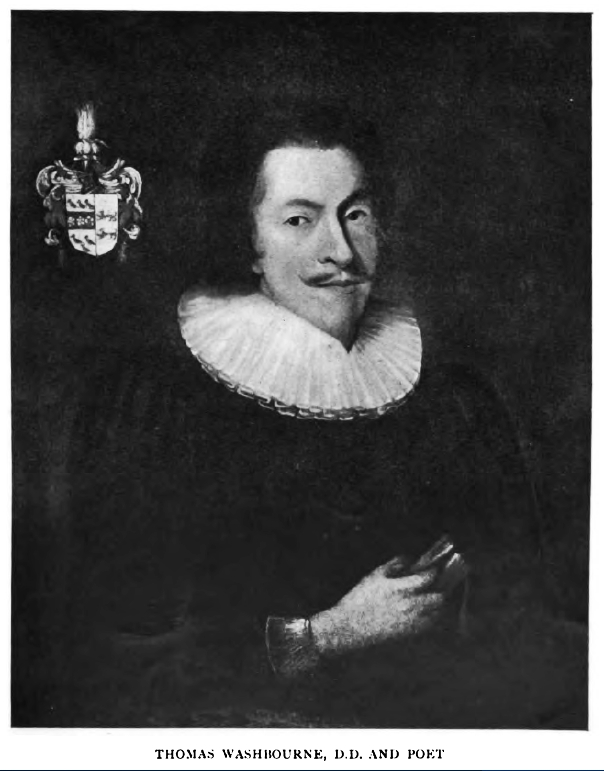
Rev. Dr. Thomas Washbourne, D.D.

Thomas Washbourne (1606–1687) was an English clergyman and poet, known for his 1654 book Divine Poems. The Poems of Thomas Washbourne, D.D., was published in 1869, edited by Alexander Grosart, and kept Washbourne's name as a religious poet alive.

He was born at Wichenford Court, in Worcestershire, of the Armigerous Knights Washbourne line, and educated at Balliol College, Oxford. In 1642, he became rector of Dumbleton, while a prebendary canon of Gloucester Cathedral.

He married Dorothy, daughter of Samuel Fell DD, Dean of Christ Church and sister of John Fell, Bishop of Oxford.

He died on 6 May 1687.
