= Henry Eyre =

Henry Eyre may refer to:

- Henry Eyre (barrister) (1628–1678), politician and lawyer
- Henry Eyre (British Army officer) (1834–1904), British Army officer and politician

== See also ==
- Henry Eyres, British viscount and WW2 lieutenant-colonel
