= Washburn House =

Washburn House may refer to:

- Washburn House (Guy, Arkansas), listed on the National Register of Historic Places (NRHP)
- George Washburn House, Calais, Maine, NRHP-listed
- Gov. Israel Washburn House, Orono, Maine, NRHP-listed
- Salmon Washburn House, Taunton, Massachusetts, NRHP-listed
- Alvin and Grace Washburn House, Orem, Utah, NRHP-listed

== See also ==
- Washburne House, Galena, Illinois, NRHP-listed
