= Wichenford =

Village in Worcestershire, England

Coordinates: 52.243637°N 2.311928°W

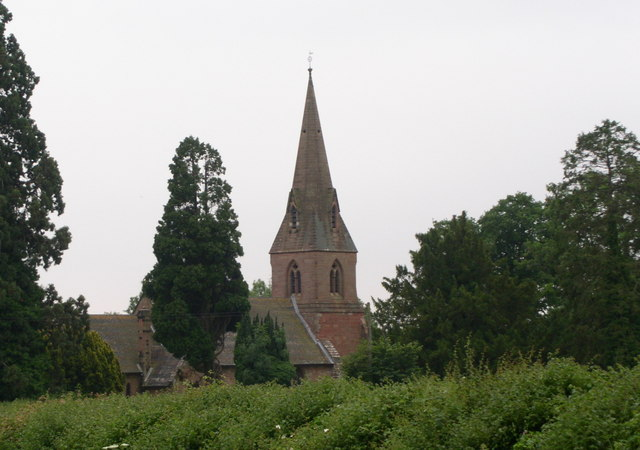
- Wichenford Church

- Location within Worcestershire
- Population: 606
- OS grid reference: SO787606
- District: Malvern Hills
- Shire county: Worcestershire
- Region: West Midlands
- Country: England
- Sovereign state: United Kingdom
- Post town: WORCESTER
- Postcode district: WR6
- Police: West Mercia
- Fire: Hereford and Worcester
- Ambulance: West Midlands
- UK Parliament: West Worcestershire

Wichenford is a village and civil parish (with Kenswick) in the Malvern Hills District in the county of Worcestershire, England. It lies 7 miles (11 km) to the north-west of the city of Worcester and has a population of c 400 for around 250 households. Primary education is provided at nearby Hallow, and at Martley, which also has a secondary school. The civil parish population was 606 in 2021.

== History ==
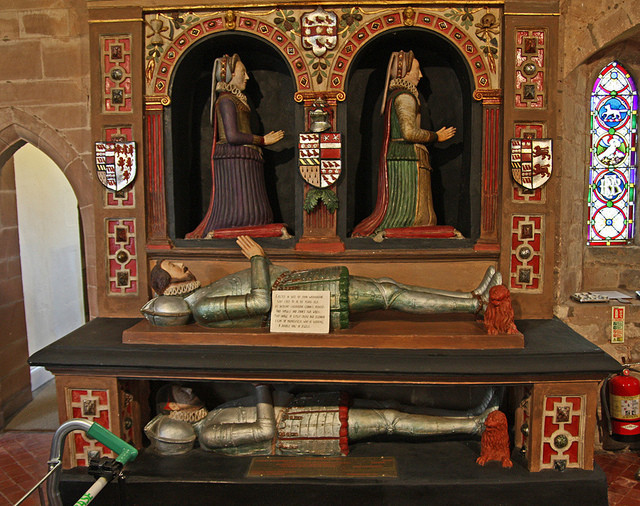
Washbourne monument at St Laurence's Wichenford

Two Roman coins were found in the parish of Wichenford during an excavation at Woodend Farm which took place a few years before 1848. The coins are from the times of Victorinus and Constans of the early 4th century.

The name Wichenford probably derives from the Old English wiceford meaning 'wych elm ford'.

During the Anglo-Saxon period, Wichenford was gifted by Offa of Mercia (The Midland King) to the Church of Worcester in the later part of the 8th century.

=== Church of St Lawrence ===
A church or chapel has existed at Wichenford from early times with mention of a chapel which was attached to the church of St. Helen, Worcester around 1234. Parts of the present church of St Lawrence date from about 1320. Evidence from pre-Reformation wills reveals that there was formerly an image or statue of Saint Michael in the chancel.

=== Wichenford Court and Manor ===
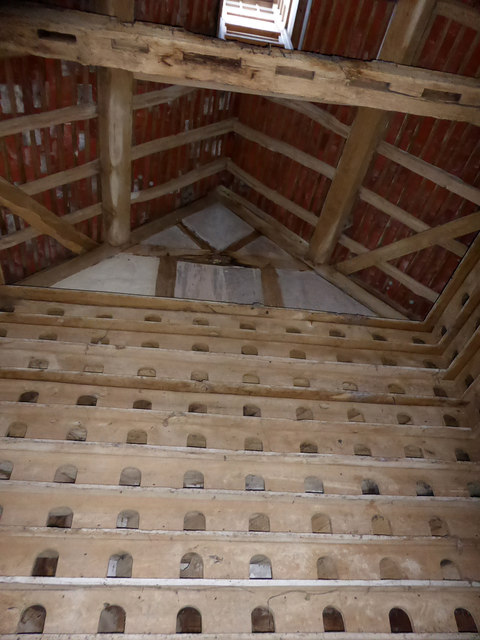
Inside Wichenford Dovecote

The manor of Wichenford belonged to the Washbourne or Washburn family, and there are two monuments with effigies and family heraldry in the church. The estate came into the Washbourne family from Margaret le Poher (d. 1454) who married John Washbourne, and her sister Agnes married another landowner in the village James de Habingdon.

It is said that around the year 1400, this Margaret Washbourne stabbed a French prisoner to death in Wichenford Court or ordered his execution, following a battle fought a few miles north of Wichenford on Woodbury Hill between forces loyal to Henry IV of England and Owain Glyndŵr from Wales who was supported by a contingent of French troops. A captured French nobleman was brought to Wichenford Court where he was murdered, a story which has persisted through the centuries, and there is allegedly still a bloodstain on the landing of the Court from the stabbed French gentleman. According to Robert Peach's 1896 history of the Washbourne family, the prisoner was one of the Bourbon Princes.

In 1651, John Washbourne of Wichenford arrived at Pitchcroft in Worcester with "forty horse" to support Charles II of England. Although it is not clear what happened to him, he may have been killed at the subsequent Battle of Worcester as there is no reference to him after that and his wife was recorded as a widow in 1653.

Wichenford Court, a partly moated manor house, has a timber-framed 17th-century dovecote, with 557 nesting boxes, now in the care of the National Trust. 17th-century panelling from Wichenford Court was removed to decorate Kenswick Manor by the Britten family in 1895. Blanche Cecile Britten, a daughter of Charles Colville, 1st Viscount Colville of Culross, and Rear-Admiral Richard Britten, resided at Kenswick and endowed several charitable foundations.

Wichenford Court and its grounds were restored after 1969, when the last tenant farmer, Mr Pugh, was fatally injured in an accident at work. This prompted the owner Lt. Col. Patrick Britten and his wife Elizabeth to decide to live in the house as their main residence.

=== 1961 air incident ===
On the evening of 7 February 1961, BAC Jet Provost 'XF893', from RAF Tern Hill in Shropshire, hit a tree, and skidded across the road to Martley.

23 year old Abbas Masry, of the Lebanese Air Force, was killed. It was his first solo flight, at night.

In August 1960 he had been banned from driving, for one month, by Market Drayton Magistrates, for taking a bend at 50mph, hitting a hedge, and somersaulting. He had only five hours previous driving on British roads.

== Community ==
Following the Poor Law Amendment Act 1834 Wichenford Parish ceased to be responsible for maintaining the poor in its parish. This responsibility was transferred to Martley Poor Law Union.

Wichenford School, now closed, was founded by the landowner Skynner G. Woodroffe in 1847 and a new building erected in 1848 was augmented around the year 1875.

The Wichenford branch of the Women's Institute was started in 1944. In the 1950s, the parish council arranged for Queen's Estate to be constructed and to make sure that the residents were able to park their cars.

Wichenford parish was joined with Kenswick parish, which had its own chapel, in 1972 for local government arrangements. In 1973, the parish council erected a bus shelter near Castle Hill and installed the first street lighting in the village which was at Queen's Estate.

== No Shops ==
Until the mid-1990s Wichenford had both a village shop with Post Office and a village bakery, both now closed down. The two shops were situated at opposite sides of the village green, in the centre of the village. Wichenford also has a pub, the Mason's Arms, which is situated on the road to Martley and is not near the village centre.

== Village Hall ==
Wichenford Memorial Hall stands opposite the church and is used by local societies and for a variety of functions. The hall has modern kitchen facilities and a "committee room" with a bar area.

There is a "War Memorial" plaque within the hall to those from the village that have lost their lives while serving their country.

== Open Gardens and Village Fete ==
Biennially in odd-numbered years, several village residents open their private gardens to the public over a weekend in June; the 2017 event raised over £10,000 for local charities. In even-numbered years, a mid-July fete is held at The Memorial Hall to raise funds for local organizations.

== Millennium Green ==
In the year 2000 the Millennium Green was opened.

== In fiction ==
Julius Falconer's 2010 publication The Wichenford Court Murder is an entirely fictional story set in the 20th century and has no connection or coverage of the murder at Wichenford Court that took place in the early 1400s.

== Notable residents ==
- Thomas Washbourne (1606–1687), poet
- Charles Colville, 5th Viscount Colville of Culross, lived for at time at Abingdon Cottage

== Bibliography ==
- Beach, A. J; Beach, E. M (1979). The Story of Wichenford. Upton-upon-Severn, Worcestershire: Severn Side Printers.
