= St Mary's Church, Little Washbourne =

Coordinates: 51.9994°N 2.0172°W

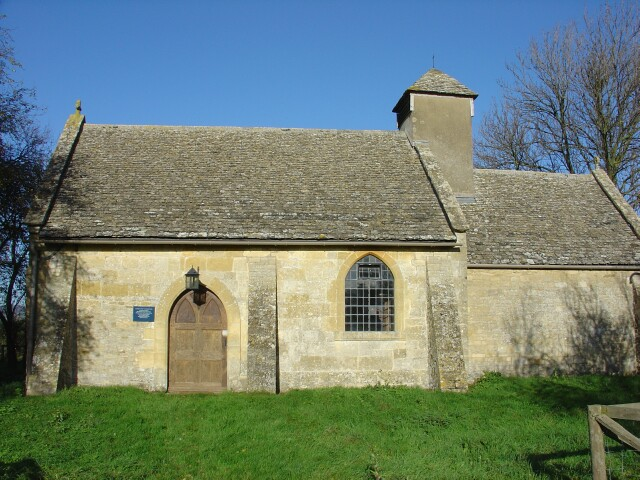
- St Mary's Church, Little Washbourne, from the south

- Location in Gloucestershire
- OS grid reference: SO 989 334
- Location: Little Washbourne, Gloucestershire
- Country: England
- Denomination: Anglican

Architecture
- Functional status: Redundant
- Heritage designation: Grade II*
- Designated: 4 July 1960
- Architectural type: Church
- Groundbreaking: 12th century
- Completed: 18th century

Specifications
- Materials: Limestone, Cotswold slate roofs

St Mary's Church, is a historic Anglican church at Little Washbourne in the civil parish of Dumbleton, Gloucestershire, England under the care of the Churches Conservation Trust. It is recorded in the National Heritage List for England as a designated Grade II* listed building.

== History ==
The church dates from the 12th century. Alterations were made to it in the 18th century, when the north wall and part of the south wall were rebuilt.

== Architecture ==
=== Exterior ===
St Mary's is constructed in limestone, with Cotswold slate roofs. Its plan is simple, consisting of a five-bay nave and a two-bay chancel with a roof at a slightly lower level. At the west end of the roof of the chancel is a bellcote with rendered walls, some weatherboarding, and a pyramidal roof. In the south wall of the nave are three buttresses, a window under a pointed arch, and a doorway also with a pointed arch. At the west end of the church are pilaster buttresses, and a window under a pointed arch. The north wall of the nave also has three buttresses. The chancel is supported by buttresses, one on both the north and south walls, and two on the east wall. Also in the east wall is a window under a pointed arch. In the north wall of the chancel is a slit window dating from the 12th century.

=== Interior ===
The floor of the church is flagged, and the walls are limewashed. Inside the church are panelled box pews, an octagonal pulpit with a sounding board, communion rails, and a communion table, all dating from the 18th century. The octagonal stone font dates from a similar period. There are traces of paintings on the walls. On the north wall of the chancel is a monument in white and grey marble to the memory of William Hill who died in 1786.

== See also ==
- List of churches preserved by the Churches Conservation Trust in the English Midlands
