= Monascella =

Scientific classification
- Kingdom: Fungi
- Division: Ascomycota
- Class: Eurotiomycetes
- Order: Onygenales
- Family: Onygenaceae
- Genus: Monascella; Guarro & Arx

Type species
- Monascella botryosa Guarro & Arx

Genus of fungi

Monascella is a genus of fungi within the Onygenaceae family. This is a monotypic genus, containing the single species Monascella botryosa.
