= Washburn, West Virginia =

Washburn
- Unincorporated community
- Location within the state of West Virginia Washburn (the United States)
- Coordinates: 39°08′32″N 81°02′48″W
- Country: United States
- State: West Virginia
- County: Ritchie
- Elevation: 751 ft (229 m)
- Time zone: UTC-5 (Eastern (EST))
  - Summer (DST): UTC-4 (EDT)
- GNIS ID: 1549979

Washburn is an unincorporated community in Ritchie County, in the U.S. state of West Virginia.

== History ==
A post office called Washburn was established in 1891, and remained in operation until 1963. The community was named after Cyrus Washburn, who was instrumental in securing the town a post office.
