= F. L. Washburn =

American entomologist

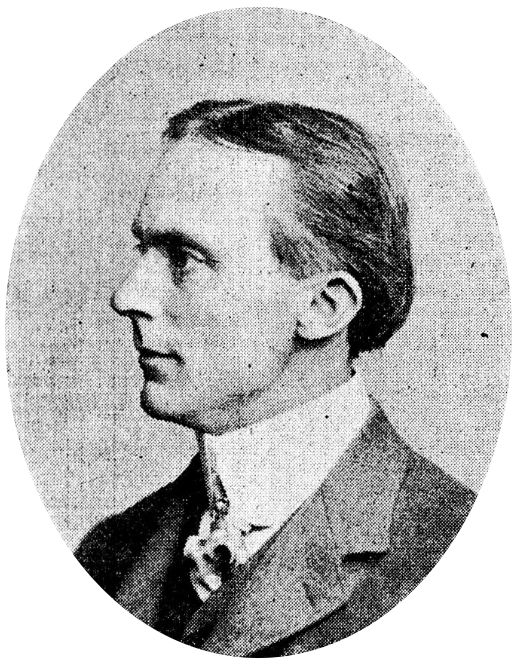

Frederic Leonard Washburn (April 12, 1860 – October 15, 1927) was an American zoologist. Born in Brookline, Massachusetts, he earned a B.A. (1882) and M.A. (1895) from Harvard University. Between 1888 and 1902 he was professor at Oregon State Agricultural College and biologist for the State of Oregon. He was Minnesota State Entomologist, professor, and chief of the Division of Entomology at University of Minnesota from 1902 to 1918. He was the 1911 president of the American Association of Economic Entomologists was made a fellow of the Entomological Society of America in 1924. His books include Injurious Insects and Useful Birds, and Insects of Minnesota.
