= Alvin and Grace Washburn House =

Historic residence in Orem, Utah, United States

- U.S. National Register of Historic Places
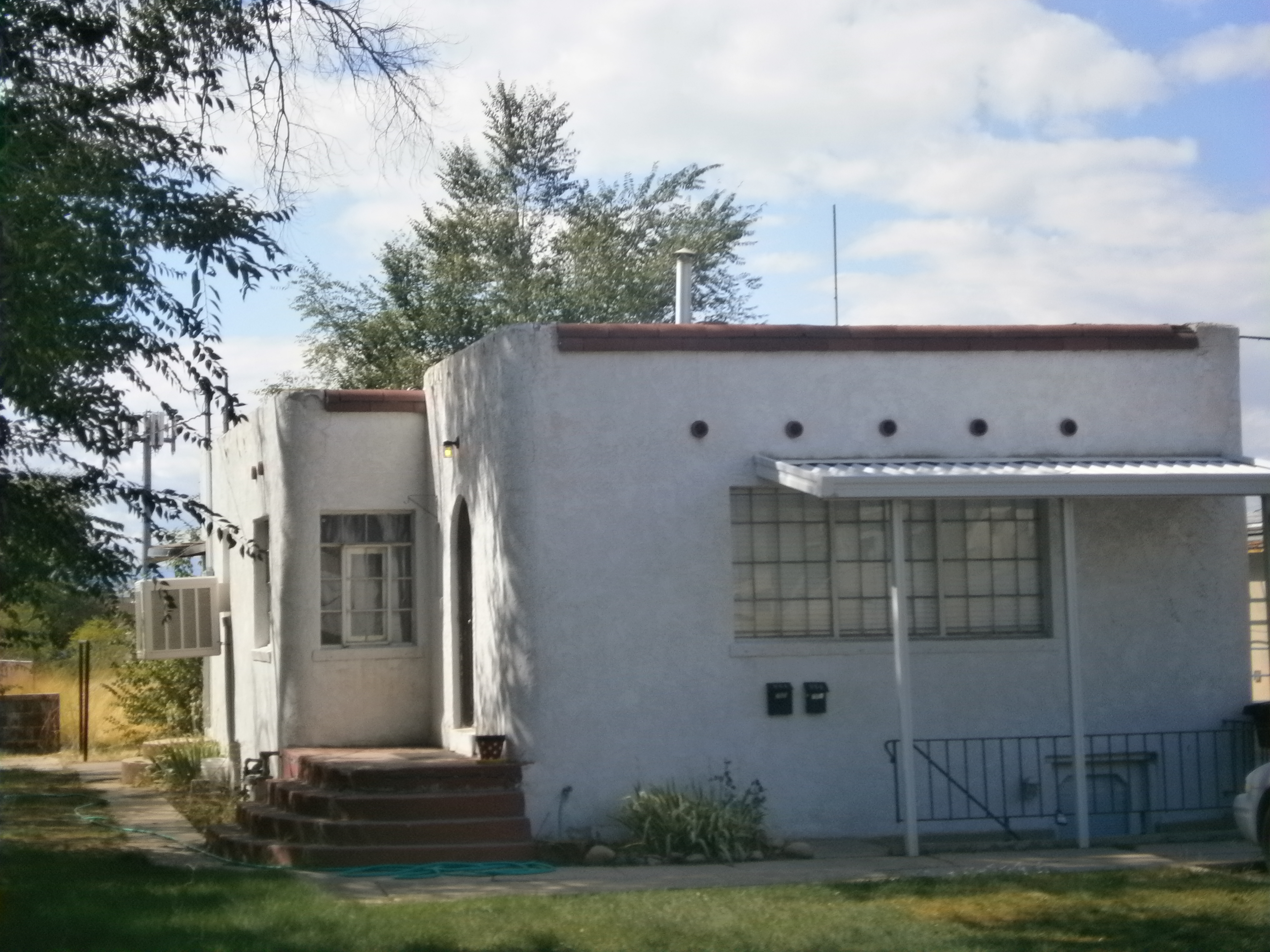
- Alvin and Grace Washburn House, September 2019

- Location within Utah Location within the United States
- Location: 753 North 100 West; Orem, Utah; United States
- Coordinates: 40°18′41″N 111°41′53″W
- Area: 0.5 acres (0.20 ha)
- Built: 1938
- Architectural style: Pueblo Revival, International Style
- MPS: Orem, Utah MPS
- NRHP reference No.: 99001629
- Added to NRHP: December 30, 1999

The Alvin and Grace Washburn House is a historic residence in Orem, Utah, United States, that is listed on the National Register of Historic Places (NRHP).

== Description ==
The house is located at 753 North 100 West and was built in 1938. It is architecturally unique in Orem.

It was listed on the NRHP December 30, 1999.

== See also ==
- National Register of Historic Places in Utah County, Utah
