= Graham Eyres-Monsell, 2nd Viscount Monsell =

English intelligence officer (1905–1993)

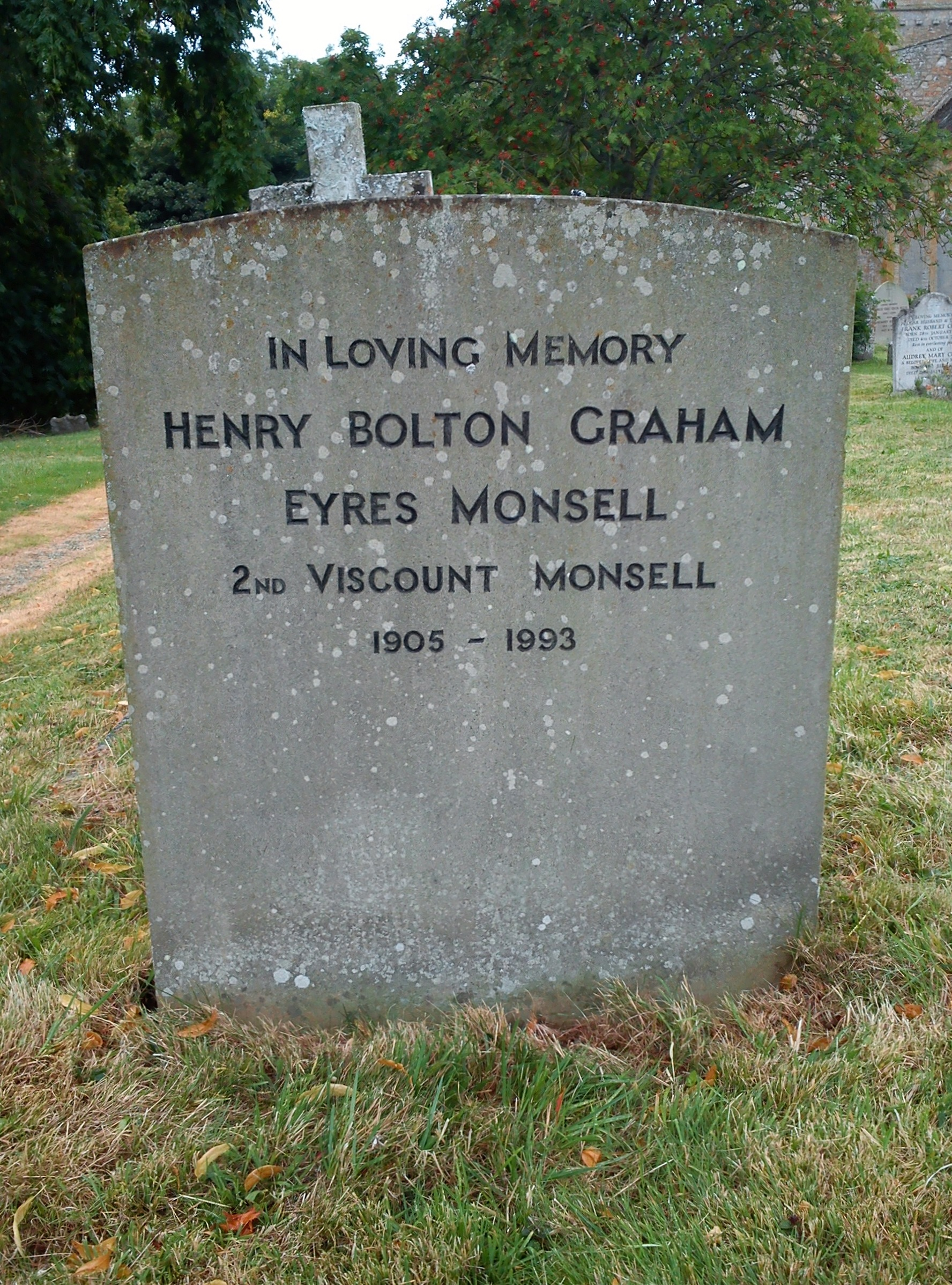
St Peter's church, Dumbleton, churchyard: Grave of the 2nd Viscount Monsell

Henry Bolton Graham Eyres-Monsell, 2nd Viscount Monsell (21 November 1905 – 28 November 1993) served in the Intelligence Corps during the Second World War, reaching the rank of lieutenant colonel. He was mentioned in dispatches on 16 September 1943 and recommended for the MBE for his services to security during the planning stages of Operation Torch. No confirmation of this latter award has been found. However, he was awarded the United States Medal of Freedom with Bronze Palm.

He was the son of Bolton Eyres Monsell and his wife Sybil (née Eyres). His father, who was Conservative Member of Parliament for Evesham from 1910 to 1935, served as Conservative Chief Whip from 1923 to 1929, and First Lord of the Admiralty from 1931 to 1936 and became Viscount Monsell in 1935. The second Lord Monsell had three sisters, one of whom, Joan was a photographer who married Paddy Leigh Fermor.

A homosexual bachelor, he died without issue. The title Viscount Monsell is now extinct. The Cotswolds family seat, Dumbleton Hall, is now a hotel.

== Arms ==
Coat of arms of Graham Eyres-Monsell, 2nd Viscount Monsell

Crest
1st a lion rampant Proper holding between his paws a mullet of the arms (Monsell). 2nd upon a mount Vert a human leg couped at the thigh in armour quarterly Sable and Or the spur Gold on either side three cinquefoils slipped Vert the leg charged for distinction with a cross-crosslet Argent (Eyres).
Escutcheon
Quarterly 1st & 4th Argent on a chevron between three mullets Sable a chevron slipped Or (Monsell) 2nd Sable on a chevron nebuly plain cottised between three cinquefoils Or as many woolpacks Proper and for distinction a canton Argent (Eyres) 3rd Per fess Argent and Or a fess chequy Gules and Argent in chief a lion rampant between two crosses pattée Gules and for distinction a canton Sable (Kettlewell).
Supporters
On either side a sea lion per chevron Argent and Sable semée of mullets counterchanged.
Motto
Mone Sale

Peerage of the United Kingdom
Preceded by Bolton Eyres-Monsell	Viscount Monsell; 1969–1994	Extinct
