= Washburn, Bayfield County, Wisconsin =

Washburn, Wisconsin
- Town
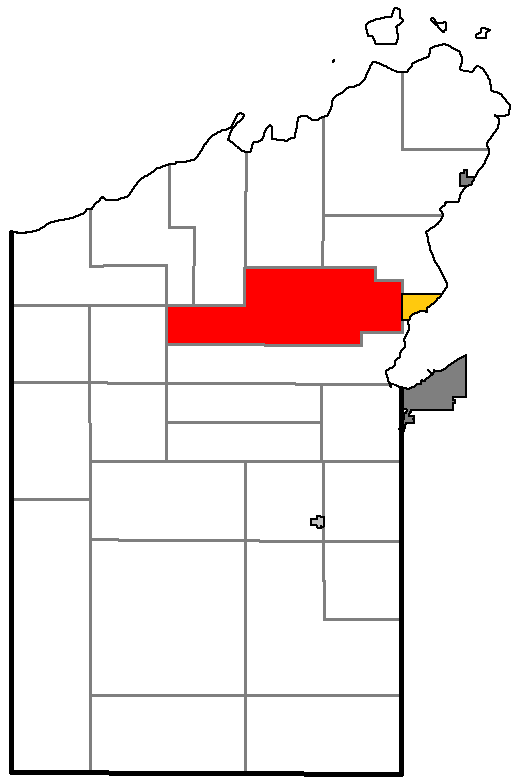
- Location of Washburn, within Bayfield County
- Coordinates: 46°39′41″N 91°4′44″W
- Country: United States
- State: Wisconsin
- County: Bayfield

Area
  - Total: 85.3 sq mi (220.8 km^{2})
  - Land: 85.1 sq mi (220.3 km^{2})
  - Water: 0.19 sq mi (0.5 km^{2})
- Elevation: 1,175 ft (358 m)

Population (2020)
  - Total: 554
  - Density: 6.51/sq mi (2.51/km^{2})
- Time zone: UTC-6 (Central (CST))
  - Summer (DST): UTC-5 (CDT)
- Area codes: 715 & 534
- FIPS code: 55-83550
- GNIS feature ID: 1584350
- Website: townofwashburn.wi.gov

There is another Town of Washburn in Clark County.

Washburn is a town in Bayfield County, Wisconsin, United States. The population was 554 at the 2020 census, up from 530 at the 2010 census. The City of Washburn is located just east of and adjacent to the town.

Wisconsin Highway 13 and County Highway C are the main routes in the community.

== Geography ==
According to the United States Census Bureau, the town has a total area of 85.3 square miles (220.8 km^{2}), of which 85.1 square miles (220.3 km^{2}) is land and 0.19 square miles (0.5 km^{2}), or 0.22%, is water.

== Demographics ==
As of the census of 2000, there were 541 people, 189 households, and 160 families residing in the town. The population density was 6.4 people per square mile (2.5/km^{2}). There were 227 housing units at an average density of 1.0 persons/km^{2} (2.7 persons/sq mi). The racial makeup of the town was 92.79% White, 0.00% African American, 4.62% Native American, 0.37% Asian, 0.00% Pacific Islander, 0.00% from other races, and 2.22% from two or more races. 0.00% of the population were Hispanic or Latino of any race.

There were 189 households, out of which 41.8% had children under the age of 18 living with them, 75.1% were married couples living together, 5.3% have a woman whose husband does not live with her, and 15.3% were non-families. 13.8% of all households were made up of individuals, and 4.8% had someone living alone who was 65 years of age or older. The average household size was 2.86 and the average family size was 3.12.

In the town, the population was spread out, with 29.6% under the age of 18, 4.4% from 18 to 24, 25.3% from 25 to 44, 31.2% from 45 to 64, and 9.4% who were 65 years of age or older. The median age was 42 years. For every 100 females, there were 113.8 males. For every 100 females age 18 and over, there were 101.6 males.

The median income for a household in the town was $46,500, and the median income for a family was $51,382. Males had a median income of $36,696 versus $24,500 for females. The per capita income for the town was $17,892. 4.6% of the population and 3.4% of families were below the poverty line. Out of the total people living in poverty, 3.0% are under the age of 18 and 17.0% are 65 or older.
