= Washburne State Wayside =

State park in Oregon, United States

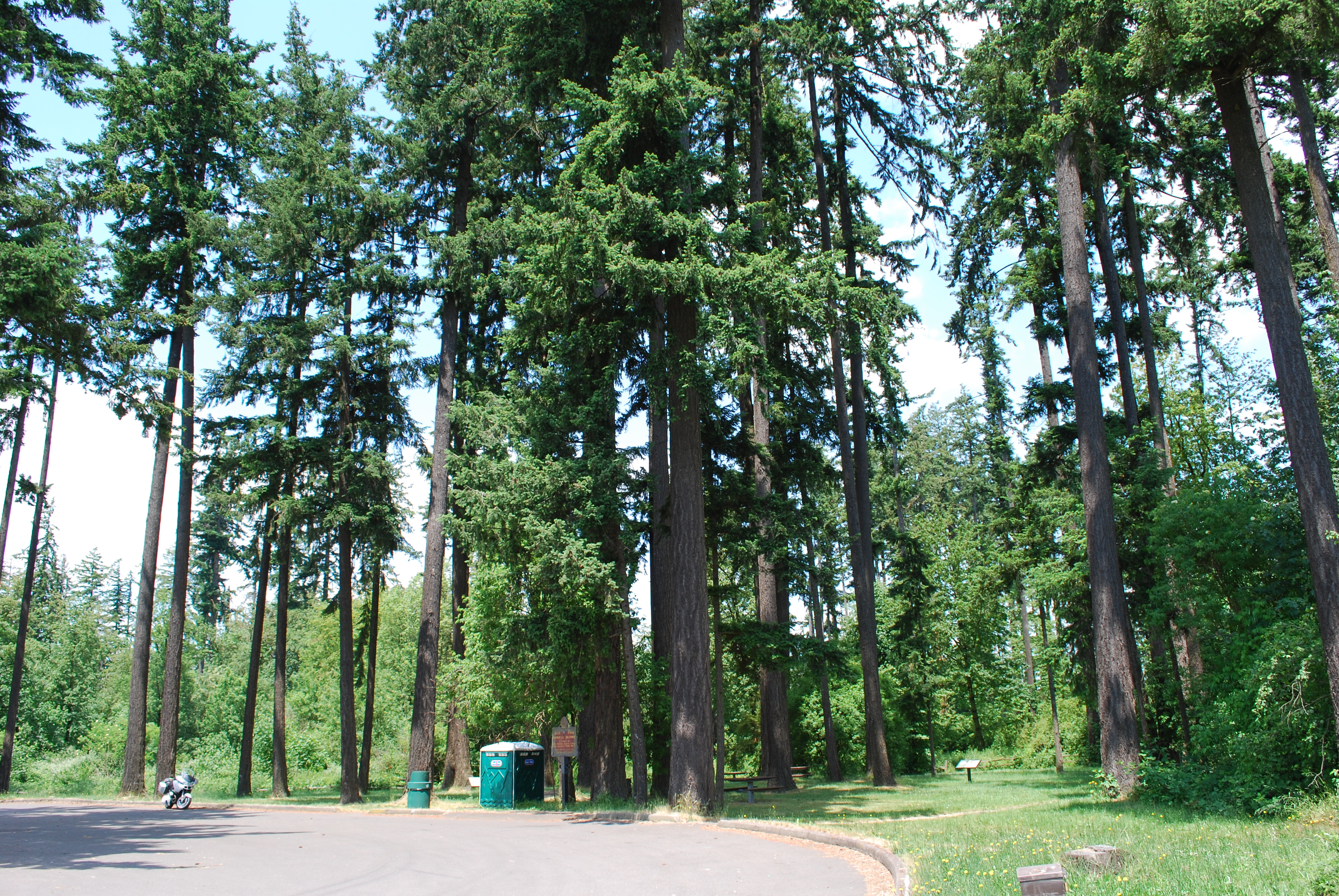
- Grove of Douglas firs at the rest stop

- Location within Oregon Location within the United States
- Type: Public, state
- Location: Benton and Lane counties, Oregon
- Nearest city: Eugene
- Coordinates: 44°16′53″N 123°14′42″W
- Area: 37.3 acres (15.1 ha)
- Operator: Oregon Parks and Recreation Department
- Visitors: about 131,000 a year
- Open: year-round
- Status: day use

Washburne State Wayside was a state park 4 miles (6 km) northwest of Junction City, in the U.S. state of Oregon. Administered by the Oregon Parks and Recreation Department, the wayside served as a rest stop for travelers on Oregon Route 99W and an interpretive center for the Applegate Trail. The state bought the land for the park in 1926 from William C. and Mae E. Washburne. It was located on the border between Lane and Benton counties.

Amenities included picnic tables, a restroom, a nature trail, and interpretive signs about the Applegate Trail. The day-use park, formerly open year-round, was visited by about 131,000 people a year. The nature trail led into a forest of second-growth Douglas fir. This is no longer a park. It is private owned land and the big trees have been logged off.

== See also ==
- List of Oregon state parks
