= Bolton Eyres-Monsell, 1st Viscount Monsell =

British politician (1881–1969)

The Right Honourable The Viscount Monsell GBE PC
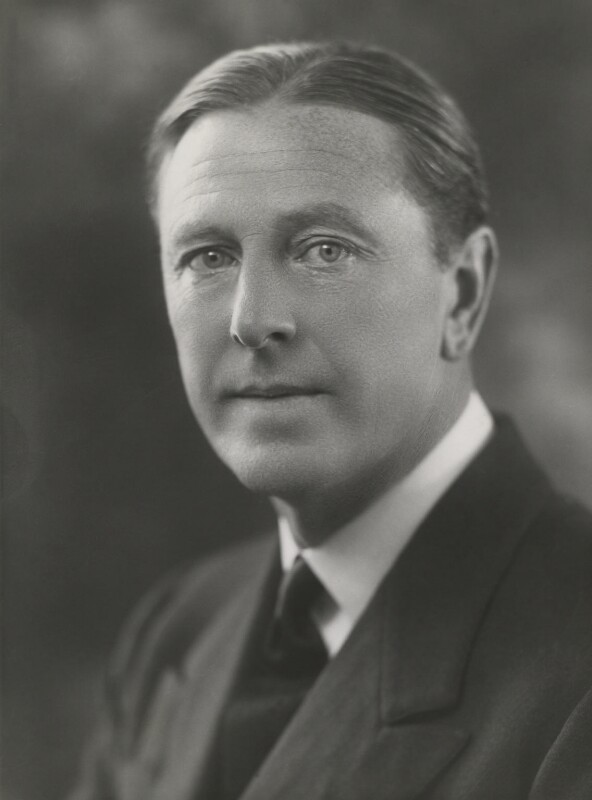

First Lord of the Admiralty
- In office November 1931 – 1936

Parliamentary Secretary to the Treasury
- In office November 1924 – June 1929

Parliamentary Secretary to the Treasury
- In office July 1923 – January 1924

Parliamentary and Financial Secretary to the Admiralty
- In office October 1922 – May 1923

Civil Lord of the Admiralty
- In office April 1921 – October 1922

Personal details
- Born: Bolton Meredith Monsell; 22 February 1881
- Died: 21 March 1969 (aged 88)

Bolton Meredith Eyres-Monsell, 1st Viscount Monsell (born Monsell; 22 February 1881 – 21 March 1969) was a British Conservative Party politician who served as Chief Whip until 1931 and then as First Lord of the Admiralty.

== Biography ==
His parents were Lt. Col. Bolton James Alfred Monsell, a soldier and a Chief Constable in the Metropolitan Police, and Mary Beverley, daughter of Sir Edmund Ogle, 6th Baronet. Bolton Monsell took the name Eyres upon his marriage to Caroline Mary Sybil Eyres in 1904, a marriage dissolved in 1950.

Eyres-Monsell served in the Royal Navy, where he was promoted sub-lieutenant on 15 July 1900, and lieutenant on 15 July 1901. In June 1902 he was posted to the newly completed torpedo boat destroyer HMS Success, serving in the Portsmouth instructional flotilla, but only two months later, in August 1902, he was transferred to the battleship HMS Magnificent, flagship of the second in command, Channel Squadron.

He was elected as Member of Parliament for the Evesham Division of Worcestershire in January 1910 general election, and served until 1935. During the First World War, he again served as a Royal Navy officer, achieving the rank of Commander and was awarded the Order of the Nile by the Sultan of Egypt. He was Civil Lord of the Admiralty from April 1921 to October 1922; then Parliamentary and Financial Secretary to the Admiralty until May 1923, Parliamentary Secretary to the Treasury from July 1923 to January 1924, and again from November 1924 to June 1929 and from September 1931 to November 1931. He became First Lord of the Admiralty in 1931, helped negotiate the Anglo-German Naval Agreement, retaining his office in government until 1936.

He was appointed a Privy Counsellor in the 1923 Birthday Honours, appointed a Knight Grand Cross of the Order of the British Empire (GBE) in 1929 and was created Viscount Monsell, of Evesham in the County of Worcester, on 30 November 1935.

He married a second time on 25 July 1950 to Essex Leila Hilary French. He was succeeded in the viscountcy by his son Graham. His second daughter, the Hon. Joan Eyres-Monsell (1912–2003), was married for the second time in 1968 to Patrick Leigh Fermor, the traveller and author. Lord Monsell's nephew was the British arctic explorer Henry George Watkins (1907–1932).

A suburb of Leicester is named Eyres Monsell after him; the housing estate was built on land he had owned before it was compulsorily purchased in the early 1950s.

== Arms ==
Coat of arms of Bolton Eyres-Monsell, 1st Viscount Monsell

Crest
1st a lion rampant Proper holding between his paws a mullet of the arms (Monsell). 2nd upon a mount Vert a human leg couped at the thigh in armour quarterly Sable and Or the spur Gold on either side three cinquefoils slipped Vert the leg charged for distinction with a cross-crosslet Argent (Eyres).
Escutcheon
Quarterly 1st & 4th Argent on a chevron between three mullets Sable a chevron slipped Or (Monsell) 2nd Sable on a chevron nebuly plain cottised between three cinquefoils Or as many woolpacks Proper and for distinction a canton Argent (Eyres) 3rd Per fess Argent and Or a fess chequy Gules and Argent in chief a lion rampant between two crosses pattée Gules and for distinction a canton Sable (Kettlewell).
Supporters
On either side a sea lion per chevron Argent and Sable semée of mullets counterchanged.
Motto
Mone Sale

== See also ==
- Dumbleton Hall

Parliament of the United Kingdom
Preceded by Charles Wigram Long	Member of Parliament for Evesham; January 1910–1935	Succeeded by Rupert de la Bère
Political offices
Preceded by Robert Sanders	Treasurer of the Household; 1919–1921	Succeeded by George Gibbs
Preceded by Leo Amery	Parliamentary and Financial Secretary to the Admiralty; 1922–1923	Succeeded by Archibald Boyd-Carpenter
Preceded by Leslie Wilson	Parliamentary Secretary to the Treasury; 1923–1924	Succeeded by Ben Spoor
Preceded by Ben Spoor	Parliamentary Secretary to the Treasury; 1924–1929	Succeeded by Tom Kennedy
Preceded by Sir Austen Chamberlain	First Lord of the Admiralty; 1931–1936	Succeeded by Sir Samuel Hoare
Peerage of the United Kingdom
New creation	Viscount Monsell; 1935–1969	Succeeded by (Henry Bolton) Graham Eyres-Monsell
