= Ebenezer Washburn =

Canadian politician

Sgt. Ebenezer Washburn, Esq., J.P., U.E. (April 8, 1756 – November 12, 1826) was a businessman and political figure in Upper Canada.

He was born in Attleboro, Massachusetts in 1756 and settled on a farm in what is now Rutland, Vermont. In 1777, he joined Major-General John Burgoyne's troops. He was captured but released to visit his father, who supported the rebels, in Keene, New Hampshire. He left on the pretext of getting his sister and escaped to Quebec, where he joined Edward Jessup's Loyal Rangers. After the war, he settled on a farm in Township No. 2 (Ernestown). Later, he moved to Hallowell Bridge (Picton), where he became a merchant and forwarder of goods.

He was elected to the 3rd and 4th Parliaments representing Prince Edward County. He helped introduce the District School Act of 1807 which established a school system in the province. Washburn aligned himself with the reformers in the Assembly on many issues, but found himself disagreeing with them on other issues. In 1808, he was appointed justice of the peace. He was one of the largest land-holders in the area at the time.

Near the end of his life, he suffered from edema. He died at Hallowell in 1826.

His son, Simon Ebenezer, became a lawyer, an alderman in Toronto and the clerk of the peace for the Home District.
