= Little Washbourne =

Village in Gloucestershire, England

Coordinates: 52.000°N 2.015°W

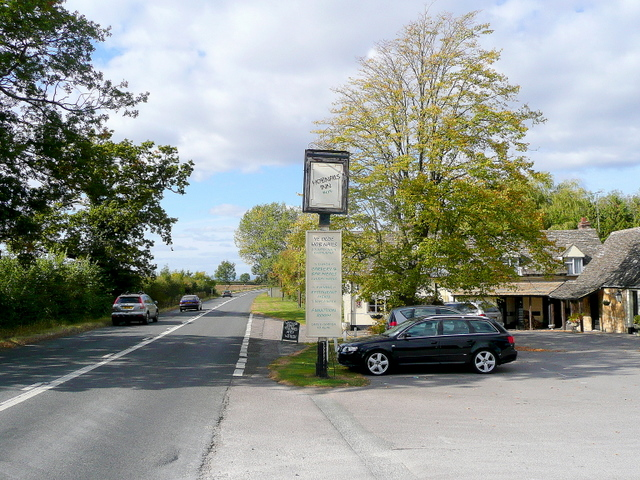
- Hobnails Inn, Little Washbourne

- Location within Gloucestershire
- OS grid reference: SO991335
- Civil parish: Dumbleton
- District: Tewkesbury
- Shire county: Gloucestershire
- Region: South West
- Country: England
- Sovereign state: United Kingdom
- Post town: Tewkesbury
- Postcode district: GL20
- UK Parliament: Tewkesbury

Little Washbourne is a village and former civil parish, now in the parish of Dumbleton, in the Tewkesbury district, in Gloucestershire, England, 6 miles (10 km) east of Tewkesbury and 6 miles (10 km) west of Evesham. In 1931 the parish had a population of 27.

St Mary's Church dates from the 12th century, and is a Grade II* listed building.

== History ==
Little Washbourne was first mentioned in a copy of a document dated to 780, in the form Uassanburnan. The name is from the Old English wæsse (genitive wæssan), meaning "swamp", and burna, meaning "stream", and so means "stream with land subject to flooding". "Little" was added much later (first recorded in the 17th century), to distinguish the place from Great Washbourne.

In 780 Offa, King of Mercia, gave land there to the monks of Worcester, and as a result the manor became a detached part of Worcestershire, separated from the rest of the county by Great Washbourne in Gloucestershire. It formed a hamlet of the Worcestershire parish of Overbury. In the 13th century the manor was held by a family who took the name Washbourne, from the place.

In 1844 Little Washbourne was transferred to Gloucestershire under the Counties (Detached Parts) Act 1844. It became a civil parish in 1866, but on 1 April 1935 the civil parish was abolished and merged into the parish of Dumbleton.
