= Viscount Monsell =

Extinct viscountcy in the Peerage of the United Kingdom

Viscount Monsell, of Evesham in the County of Worcester, was a title in the Peerage of the United Kingdom. It was created on 30 November 1935 for the Conservative politician Bolton Eyres-Monsell. The title became extinct on the death of his son, the second Viscount, in 1993.

== Viscounts Monsell (1935) ==
- Bolton Meredith Eyres-Monsell, 1st Viscount Monsell (1881–1969)
- Henry Bolton Graham Eyres-Monsell, 2nd Viscount Monsell (1905–1993)

== Arms ==
Coat of arms of Viscount Monsell

Crest
1st a lion rampant Proper holding between his paws a mullet of the arms (Monsell). 2nd upon a mount Vert a human leg couped at the thigh in armour quarterly Sable and Or the spur Gold on either side three cinquefoils slipped Vert the leg charged for distinction with a cross-crosslet Argent (Eyres).
Escutcheon
Quarterly 1st & 4th Argent on a chevron between three mullets Sable a chevron slipped Or (Monsell) 2nd Sable on a chevron nebuly plain cottised between three cinquefoils Or as many woolpacks Proper and for distinction a canton Argent (Eyres) 3rd Per fess Argent and Or a fess chequy Gules and Argent in chief a lion rampant between two crosses pattée Gules and for distinction a canton Sable (Kettlewell).
Supporters
On either side a sea lion per chevron Argent and Sable semée of mullets counterchanged.
Motto
Mone Sale
