= Dumbleton =

Village in Gloucestershire, England

Coordinates: 52.02242°N 1.97809°W

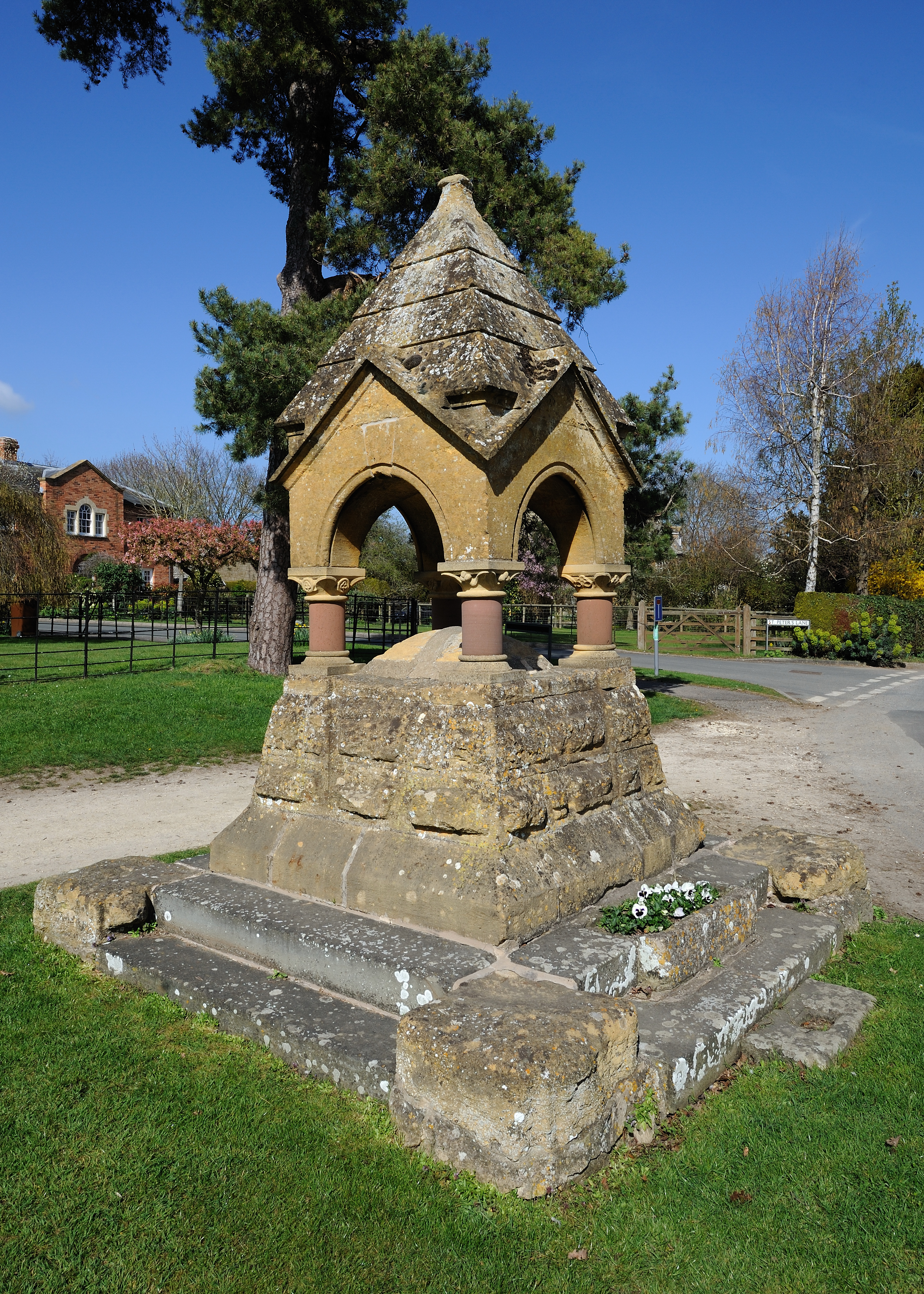
- Village Drinking Fountain

- Location within Gloucestershire
- Population: 576 (2011)
- OS grid reference: SP016360
  - London: 90 miles
- Civil parish: Dumbleton
- District: Tewkesbury
- Shire county: Gloucestershire
- Region: South West
- Country: England
- Sovereign state: United Kingdom
- Post town: Evesham
- Postcode district: WR11
- Dialling code: 01386
- Police: Gloucestershire
- Fire: Gloucestershire
- Ambulance: South Western
- UK Parliament: Tewkesbury

Dumbleton is a village and civil parish in the Tewkesbury district, in the county of Gloucestershire, England. The village is roughly 20 miles from the city of Gloucester. The village is known to have existed in the time of Æthelred I who granted land to Abingdon Abbey, and it is mentioned in the Domesday Book.

Dumbleton is on the edge of Dumbleton Hill, a foothill of the Cotswolds and is within the Cotswolds Area of Outstanding Natural Beauty. Dumbleton is mainly residential with facilities including a Village Hall from 1899, a successful Cricket Club (National Village Cup Winners 2022), a Social Club, Garden Club, Infants’ School (temporarily closed as of September 2022) and an Estate Office. The village also contains the main entrance to Dumbleton Hall, which now functions as a hotel.

The civil parish includes the village of Great Washbourne which was a separate civil parish until 1935. From 1935 to 2023 Wormington was also part of Dumbleton until the parish was split following a Community Governance Review.

== Parish church ==
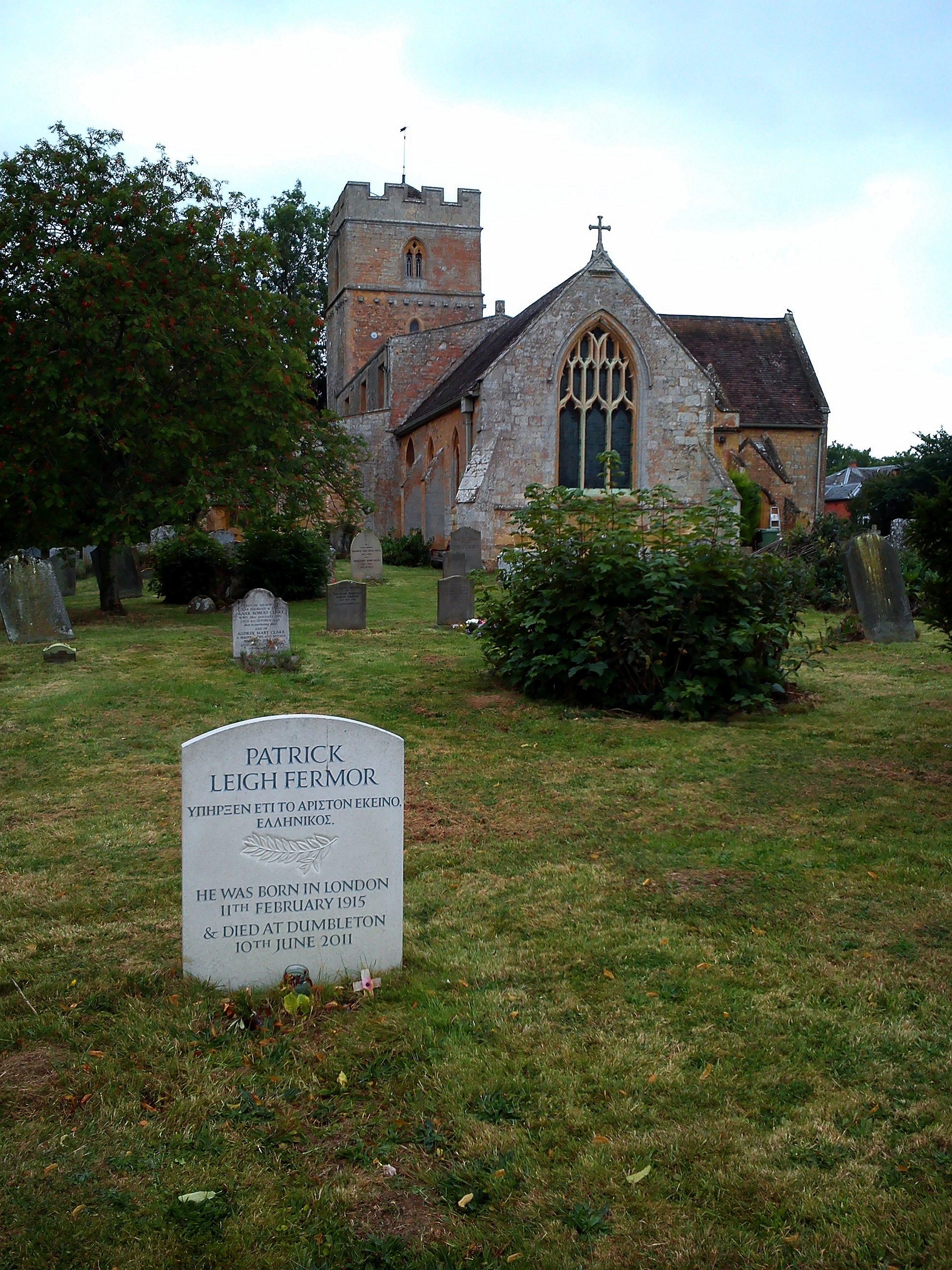
St Peter's Church and grave of Sir Patrick Leigh Fermor

St Peter's Church is of Norman origin with mainly 13th-century additions. The chancel was rebuilt in 1862. In 1960 it was designated a Grade I Listed Building.

The travel writer Sir Patrick Leigh Fermor is buried in the churchyard with his wife Joan (née Eyres Monsell) and brother-in-law Lord Monsell. Inside St Peter's Church is a memorial to their relative, Arctic explorer Gino Watkins. The merchant banker and political fundraiser Lord Hambro is also buried in the churchyard. A large painted monument dedicated to Sir Charles Percy son of the Earl of Northumberland and Dorothy Cocks, his wife, is also to be found within the church. The colourful monument of two figures kneeling over their deceased child is situated within a deep round-headed niche flanked by free-standing Corinthian columns.

The redundant St Mary's Church, Little Washbourne is also in the parish of Dumbleton. The parish was in the possession of Abingdon Abbey until the Dissolution of the Monasteries.

== The Old Rectory ==
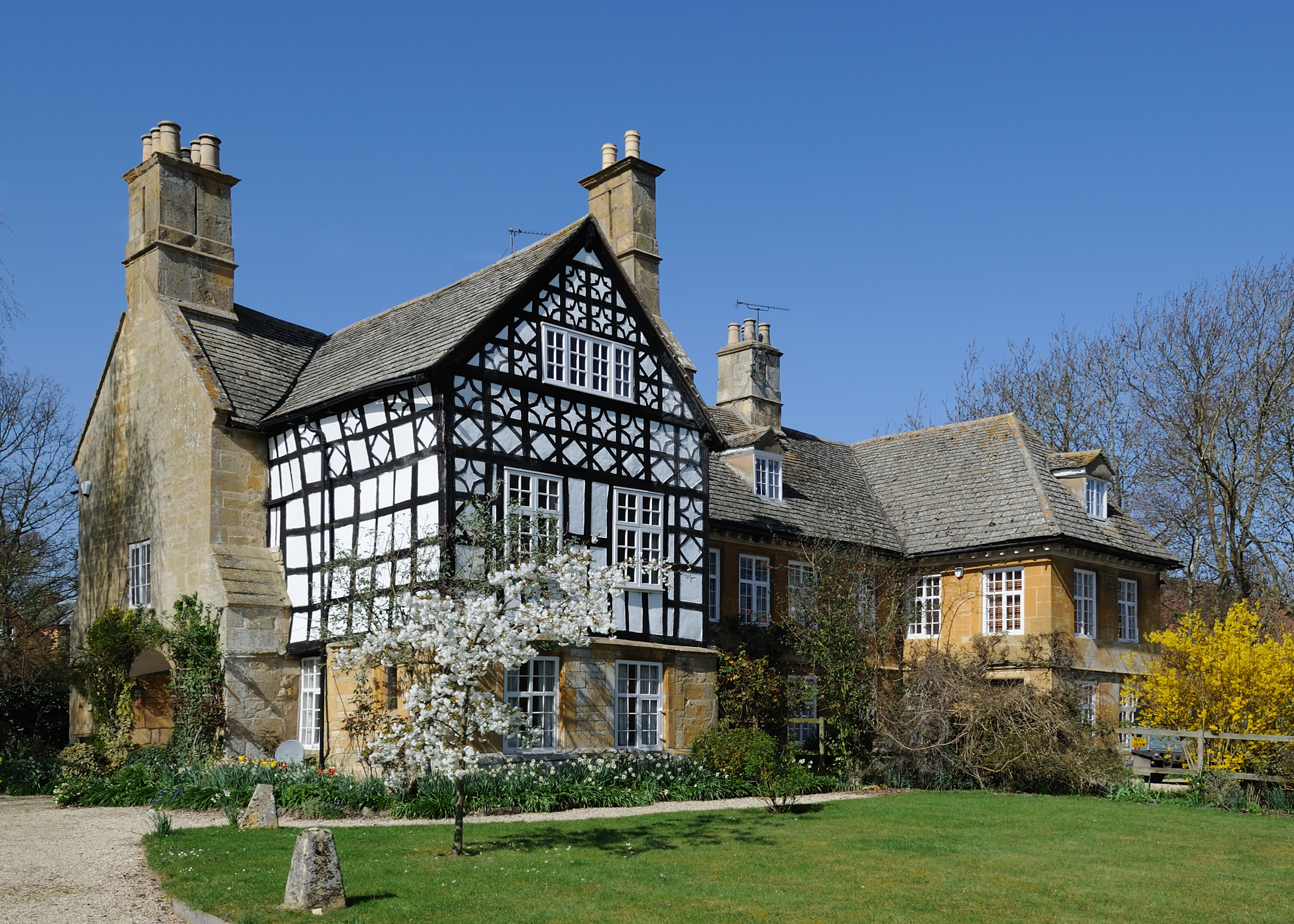
The Old Rectory

The origin and development over the years of the Old Rectory is still subject to debate. The home as it stands was constructed in the 17th century. It is divided into two wings, north and south. The south wing incorporates a 16th-century timber-framed house with detailed decorative patterning.

A blocked window at the rear of the house has a painted trompe-l'œil of another window from which the Revd. Charles Cocks is seen looking out. His likeness was copied from a painting found in Eastnor Castle. The trompe l'oeil painting was painted by artists Roy Amiss and Benoit Gardner.

Both the north and south portions of the Old Rectory are Grade II listed by English Heritage.

== Dumbleton Hall ==
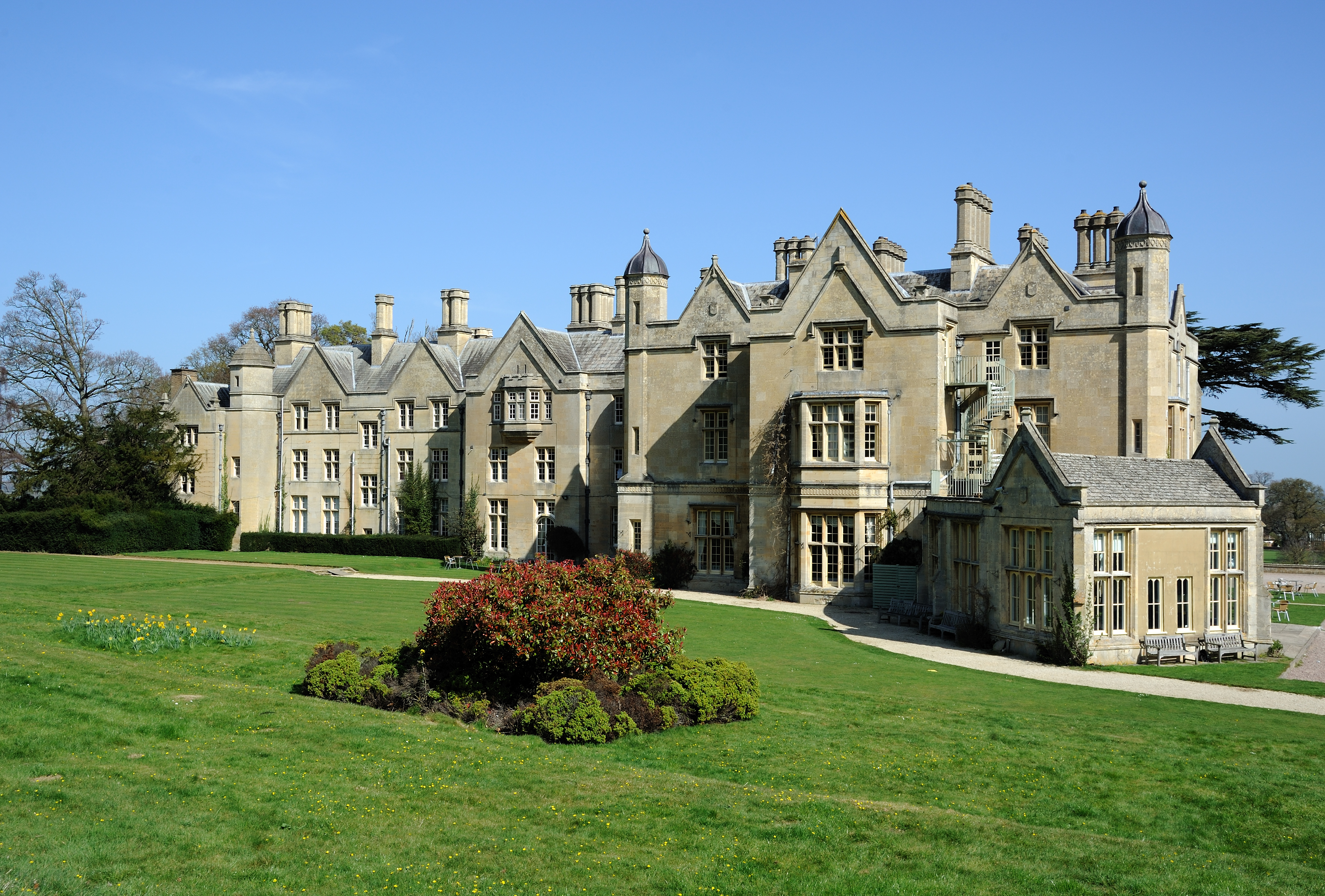
Dumbleton Hall

The original Dumbleton Hall can be traced from around 1534, as the home of the Cocks family for over 200 years. After the death of Sir Richard Cocks in the late 18th century, the Hall fell into disrepair and was eventually demolished.

Rebuilt in the mid 19th century using Cotswold stone, Dumbleton Hall became home to the Eyres family and in the 1930s, the Hall was well known for its popular house parties with regular guests including John Betjeman, later to become Poet Laureate.

During the Second World War, the Hall was allegedly considered as a suitable alternative venue for the House of Lords. It is also suggested that Hitler 'reserved' the Hall as a private residence upon his victory in Europe.

Following the death of the last member of the Eyres family to own the Hall, Caroline Mary Sybil Eyres-Monsell, Viscountess Monsell, formerly married to Bolton Eyres-Monsell, 1st Viscount Monsell, the Hall was sold and her son Graham and daughter Joan moved into the Mill House on the Dumbleton Hall estate. They were buried in Dumbleton as was Joan's husband Sir Patrick Leigh Fermor.

The Hall became a hotel in 1959.

The Music Video for 'Psycophantic Suicide' by Rock Band Wrathchild was filmed at the Hall in 2011.

Dumbleton Hall is Grade II* listed by English Heritage.

== Governance ==
The village falls in the 'Isbourne' electoral ward. This ward runs east–west and stretches from the Worcestershire boundary to Teddington. The total population of this ward taken at the 2011 census was 1,955.
