= Great Washbourne =

Village in Gloucestershire, England

Coordinates: 52.008°N 2.02°W

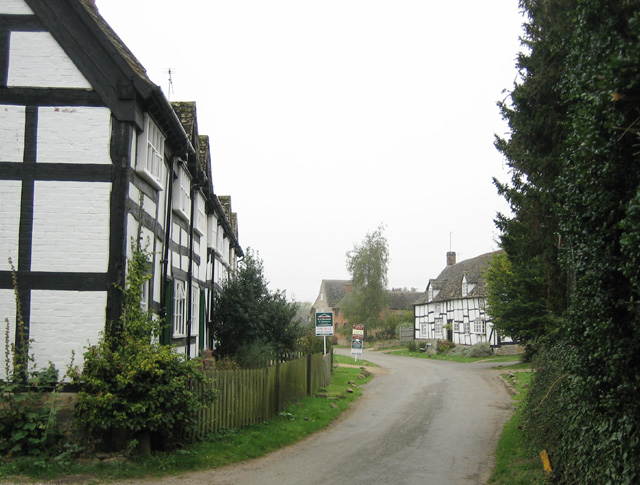

- Location within Gloucestershire
- OS grid reference: SO987344
- Civil parish: Dumbleton
- District: Tewkesbury
- Shire county: Gloucestershire
- Region: South West
- Country: England
- Sovereign state: United Kingdom
- Post town: Tewkesbury
- Postcode district: GL20
- UK Parliament: Tewkesbury

Great Washbourne is a village and former civil parish, now in the parish of Dumbleton, in the Tewkesbury district, in Gloucestershire, England, 6 miles (10 km) east of Tewkesbury and 6 miles (10 km) west of Evesham. In 1931 the parish had a population of 65.

== History ==
Washbourne was mentioned in the Domesday Book, in the form Waseborne. The name is from the Old English wæsse (genitive wæssan), meaning "swamp", and burna, meaning "stream", and so means "stream with land subject to flooding". "Great" was added much later (first recorded in the 17th century), to distinguish the place from Little Washbourne.

Washbourne was an ancient parish. In the Middle Ages the manor was held by Tewkesbury Abbey. Before the Dissolution of the monasteries it was known as Abbot's Washbourne, and for a while afterwards as King's Washbourne, to distinguish it from its neighbour, Knight's or Little Washbourne, which was a hamlet of Overbury in Worcestershire.

The parish became a civil parish in 1866, but on 1 April 1935 the civil parish was abolished and merged into the parish of Dumbleton.
