= Ismay =

Ismay may refer to:

== People ==
- Hastings Ismay, 1st Baron Ismay, British soldier and Chief of Staff during World War II
- J. Bruce Ismay, managing director of the White Star Line and survivor of the Titanic disaster
- Thomas Henry Ismay, father of Bruce, and founder of White Star Line
- Travis Ismay, American politician
- Stanley Ismay, British civil servant and judge in British India

== Places ==
- The town of Ismay, Montana
