= Wormington =

Village in Gloucestershire, England

Coordinates: 52.026°N 1.94°W

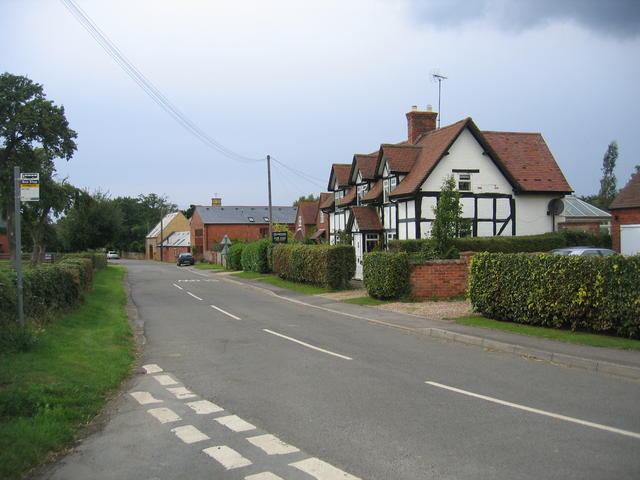
- Wormington

- Location within Gloucestershire
- OS grid reference: SP040363
- Civil parish: Wormington
- District: Tewkesbury
- Shire county: Gloucestershire
- Region: South West
- Country: England
- Sovereign state: United Kingdom
- Post town: Evesham
- Postcode district: WR11
- Dialling code: 01386
- UK Parliament: Tewkesbury

Wormington is a village civil parish in the Tewkesbury district, in Gloucestershire, England. It lies on the River Isbourne, 5 miles (8 km) north of Winchcombe and 6 miles (10 km) south of Evesham. In 1931 the parish had a population of 67.

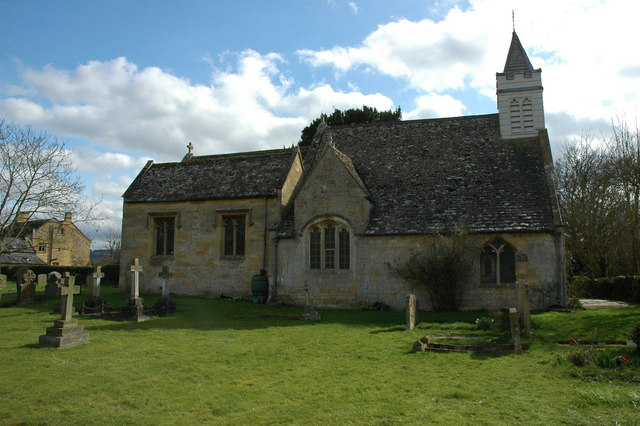
St Catherine's Church

Wormington was an ancient parish, and became a civil parish in 1866, but on 1 April 1935 the civil parish was abolished and merged into the parish of Dumbleton. On 1 April 2023 it became a parish again. The parish is governed by a parish meeting.

St Catherine's parish church is reputed to have been built in 1475 by the abbot of Hailes Abbey on the site of a 12th-century church. It is a Grade II* listed building.

Wormington Grange, a mile south of the village but just over the parish boundary in the neighbouring parish of Stanton, is a Grade II* listed country house.
