= Wormington Grange =

Country house in Stanton, Gloucestershire, England

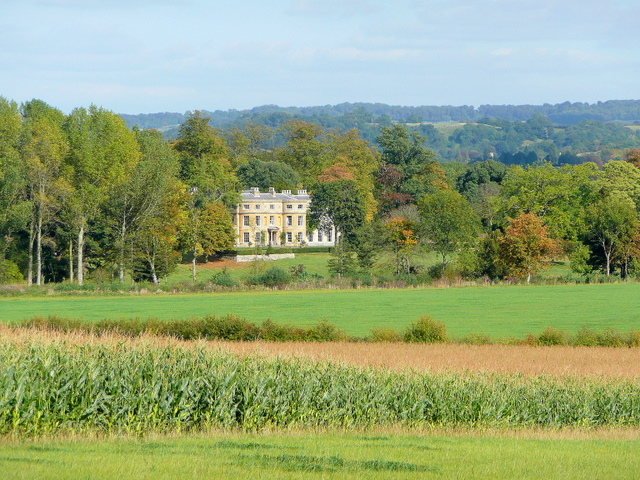

- Location within Gloucestershire

General information
- Location: Gloucestershire, England
- Coordinates: 52.0096°N 1.9332°W

Design and construction
- Designations: Grade II* Listed Building

Wormington Grange is a Grade II* listed country house in the civil parish of Stanton, Gloucestershire, England. It lies one mile (1.6 km) south of the village of Wormington.

Although the lodge appears to be of Tudor origins it is actually from the Regency period and concurrent with the Regency phase of the estate, the main house was constructed in the 1770s for Nathaniel Jeffreys. It is built of stone with a slate roof. An enlargement occurred in 1826-27 for Josiah Gist by Henry Hakewill. In the 1920s, Sir G. Dawber provided minor alterations for Mrs. Clegg. A. S. G. Butler made other changes in the mid 20th century. The full-height bow windows are attributed to Anthony Keck who was the original architect of outstanding Doric columns reminiscent of the classical Greek Temple on the Ilissus. The later additions by Hakewill included notable pilasters, particularly in a dining-room, built in the new east wing, adjacent to a grand entrance hall with ionic columns.

The house was later lived in by General Hastings Ismay, 1st Baron Ismay, KG GCB CH DSO PC DL, who remodelled the north side servants' quarters to Butler's design in 1947. Hakewill's stables nearby were neo-classical after Sir Hans Sloane's inspirational style. The Cleggs completely re-designed the gardens to which wrought iron front gates, designed by Norman Jewson appeared in about 1930. The limestone and Sussex bond brickwork stable block, which has a slate roof, was added 1827. The central store room is of two storeys with single story wings containing the horse boxes. Workshops in the stable block were used by John Evetts, the Landmark Trust furnishing manager and the grandson of Hastings Ismay, who lived in the house from the 1970s until its sale, following an auction of contents, about 2022.
