= Stanton, Gloucestershire =

Village in Gloucestershire, England

Coordinates: 52.006°N 1.902°W

Stanton
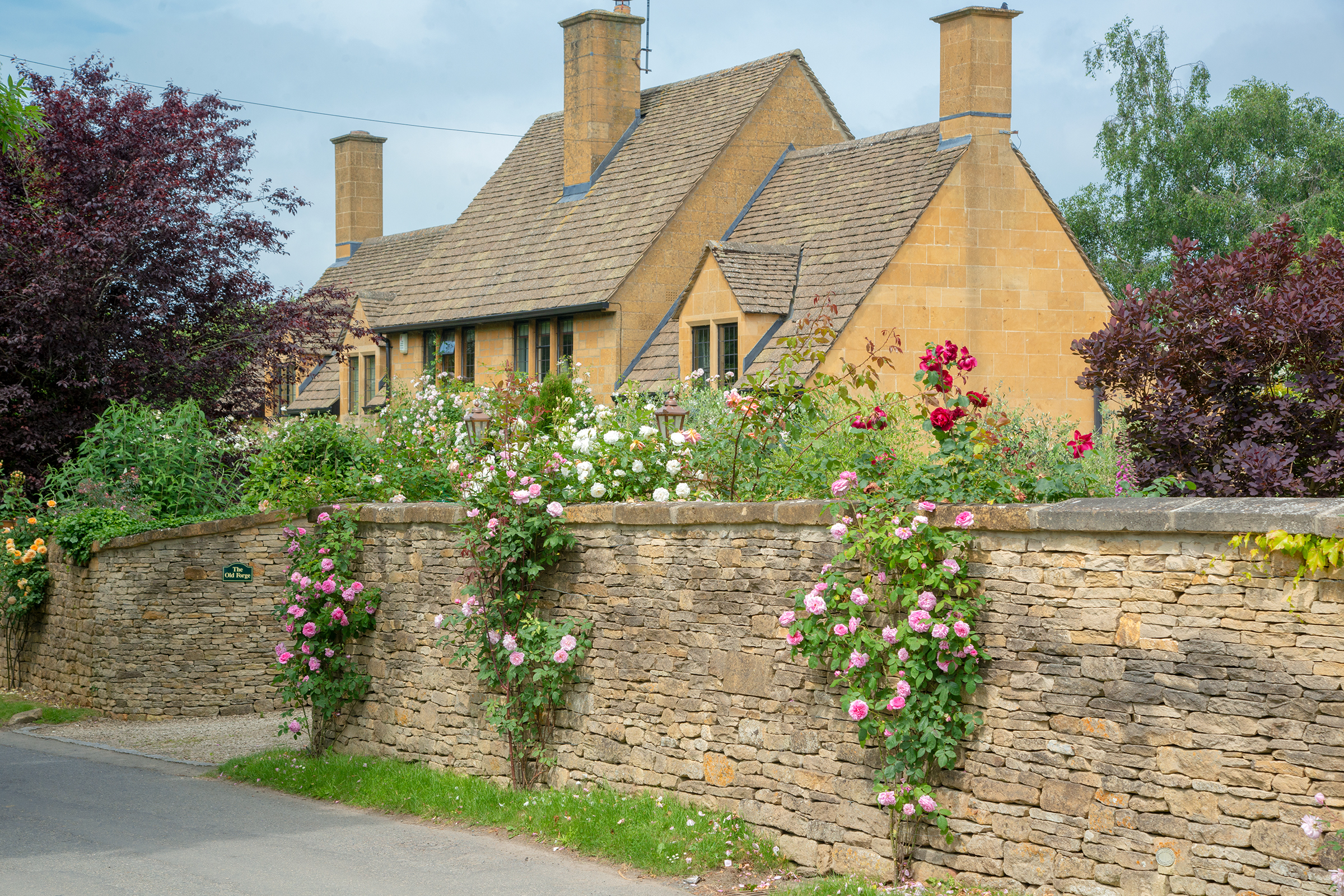
- A cottage and wall in Stanton, both built with Cotswold stone

- Location within Gloucestershire
- Population: 198 (2011 Census)
- OS grid reference: SP0634
- Civil parish: Stanton
- District: Tewkesbury Borough
- Shire county: Gloucestershire
- Region: South West
- Country: England
- Sovereign state: United Kingdom
- Post town: Broadway
- Postcode district: WR12
- Dialling code: 01386
- Police: Gloucestershire
- Fire: Gloucestershire
- Ambulance: South Western
- UK Parliament: Tewkesbury
- Website: Stanton Parish Council

Stanton is a village and civil parish in Tewkesbury Borough, Gloucestershire, England. The village is a spring line settlement at the foot of the Cotswold escarpment, about 2.5 miles (4 km) southwest of Broadway in neighbouring Worcestershire. Broadway is Stanton's postal town. The 2011 Census recorded the parish's population as 198.

The parish is about 3 miles (5 km) long on a northwest – southeast axis, embracing both low-lying land northwest of the village and high Cotswold land to the southeast. On the opposite northeast – southwest axis the parish is about 1.5 miles (2.4 km) across at its widest point. Its highest point is Shenberrow Hill on the escarpment in the southeast of the parish, 994 feet (303 m) above sea level. The low-lying northwestern part of the parish is bounded mostly by two streams, which converge and then join the River Isbourne about 0.5 miles (800 m) outside the parish. A report in 1712 indicated that the village consisted of 60 houses and 300 inhabitants, including 29 freeholders.

Much of the area of the village was owned by the Stott family from 1906 to 1949. In addition to restoring the properties, these owners built a reservoir in 1907, added lighting to the main street, improved the church, extended the school, built a swimming pool and cricket field. Today, the village has no school, post office or shops.

The village is built almost completely of Cotswold stone, a honey-coloured Jurassic limestone. Several cottages have thatched roofs. It has a high street, with a pub, The Mount, at the end. David Verey calls it "architecturally, the most distinguished of the smaller villages in the North Cotswolds". The Daily Telegraph described Stanton in 2017 as "arguably the most beautiful Cotswold village of them all" while the Huffington Post said that it's "one of the prettiest and idyllic unspoilt villages of the Cotswolds".

The Cotswold Way long-distance footpath passes through the village.

== Archaeology ==
Shenberrow, on the hill southeast of the village, is a hill fort enclosing about 2.5 acres (1 ha). It is bivallate, meaning that its defences include two concentric ditches. It was excavated in 1935, when Iron Age pottery, iron artefacts and a bronze bracelet were found. Romano-British pottery from the second century AD was also found. The fort is a Scheduled Ancient Monument.

== Manor ==
Built in 1557 by Thomas Warren, the manor belonged to Winchcombe Abbey until the Dissolution of the Monasteries and then to a series of owners, including Sir Philip Sidney Stott in the early 1900s. The English architect, civil engineer and surveyor, is credited with rescuing Stanton village from oblivion after he bought the estate in 1906. He put his fortune and skills into restoring Stanton Court and other historic buildings in the village.

== Parish church ==
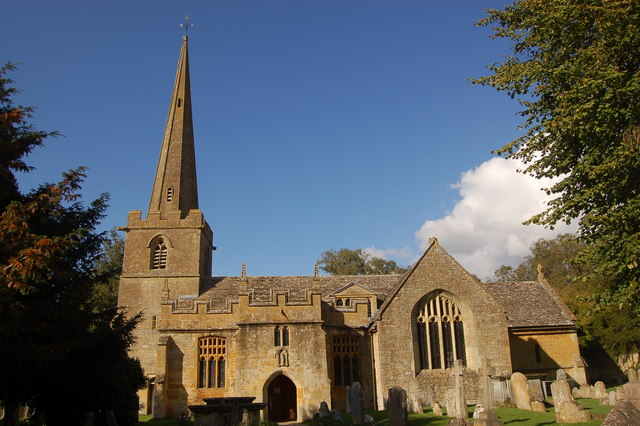
St Michael and All Angels' parish church

A church was built on this site circa 1100; the earliest remaining features are three Norman columns from about 1200 which form the north arcade. The south arcade was rebuilt with Early English Gothic pointed arches, a bay longer than the previous arcade, together with a new tower of cut stone at the West end. There are hagioscopes (squints) in both transepts, an aumbry is in the north and two more in the south transept and aisle.

The village's web site provides this comment about its early history. "It seems possible that a Saxon church on the present site was served in early times by the monks of Winchcombe Benedictine Abbey, as the Manor, tithes and patronage of Stanton were bestowed on the Abbey by Kenulf, King of Mercia in 811 AD. Unfortunately, most records were destroyed in the disastrous fire at Winchcombe Benedictine Abbey in 1151 AD."

The font, porch and parvise are 15th-century. The original pulpit and lectern date from about 1375 and were restored in 1982. There is a second pulpit added in 1684. There are medieval encaustic tiles at the east end.

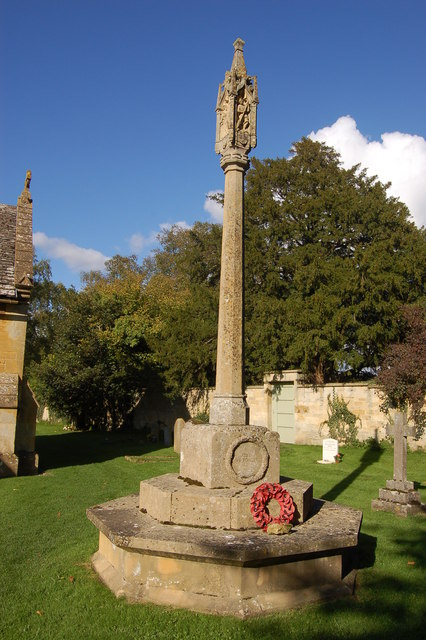
One of Stanton's two First World War memorials. This one is in St Michael's parish churchyard and was designed by Sir Ninian Comper.

Fragments of ancient painted decoration survive. There are fragments of medieval stained glass in the east window, the south transept and the west window, which also shows the White Rose of York. The reredos of 1915, the rood screen and the east windows of the chancel and transepts are by Sir Ninian Comper and Squire Stott. In the north transept are murals of the Annunciation and Purification, fragments of the medieval screen.

Still visible on the south wall is evidence of stone benches for the old and infirm, dating from when most of the congregation would stand during the parts of the service that did not require kneeling. There are medieval benches at the back of the nave: "their poppy heads ringed with the chains of shepherds' dogs". There is a wooden roundel of Mauritius Wrabury.

The west tower has a ring of six bells. Humphrey and James Keene of Woodstock, Oxfordshire cast the second, third, fourth and fifth bells in 1640. John I Martin of Worcester cast the tenor bell in 1659 and the treble in 1660. Sir Philip Stott hired designer Ninian Comper to improve the church with reredos and stained glass.

The church is a Grade I listed building.

== Historic buildings ==
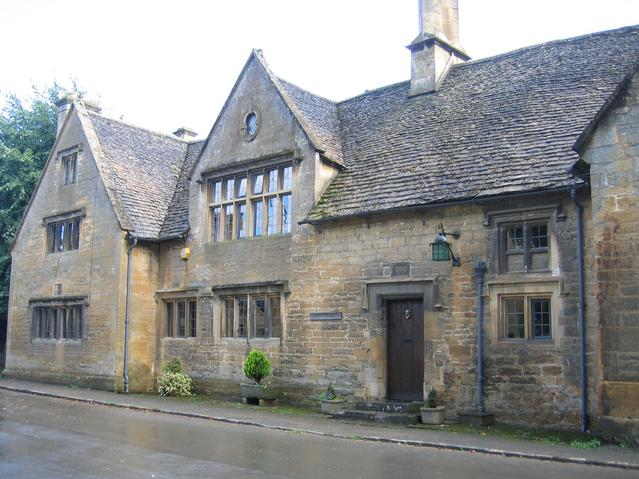
Old Manor Farmhouse

The Manor (also known as Warren House) and Warne Cottage, also called Warren House, is Elizabethan, with the year 1577 on a datestone. This was formerly manor house, and is now one house and an attached cottage. Old Manor Farmhouse, built circa 1678, is also Elizabethan.

A full 43 of the buildings in this village are Listed, all as Grade II. Some of the noteworthy properties include the following.

=== Wormington Grange ===
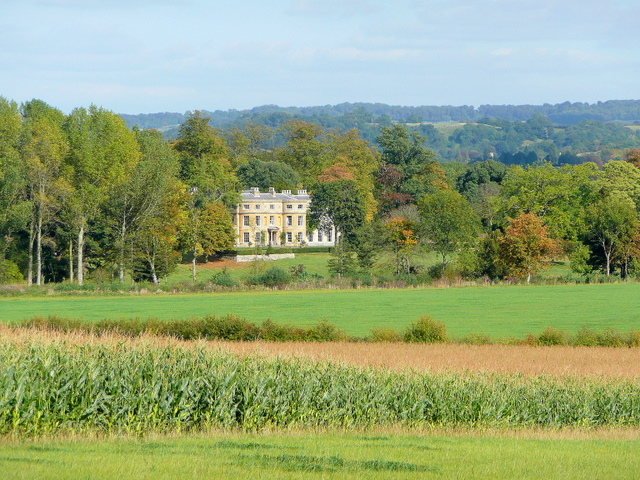
Wormington Grange

Wormington Grange was built in the 1770s. Its stables were designed by Henry Hakewill and completed in 1827. It is Grade II listed.

=== Sheppey Corner ===
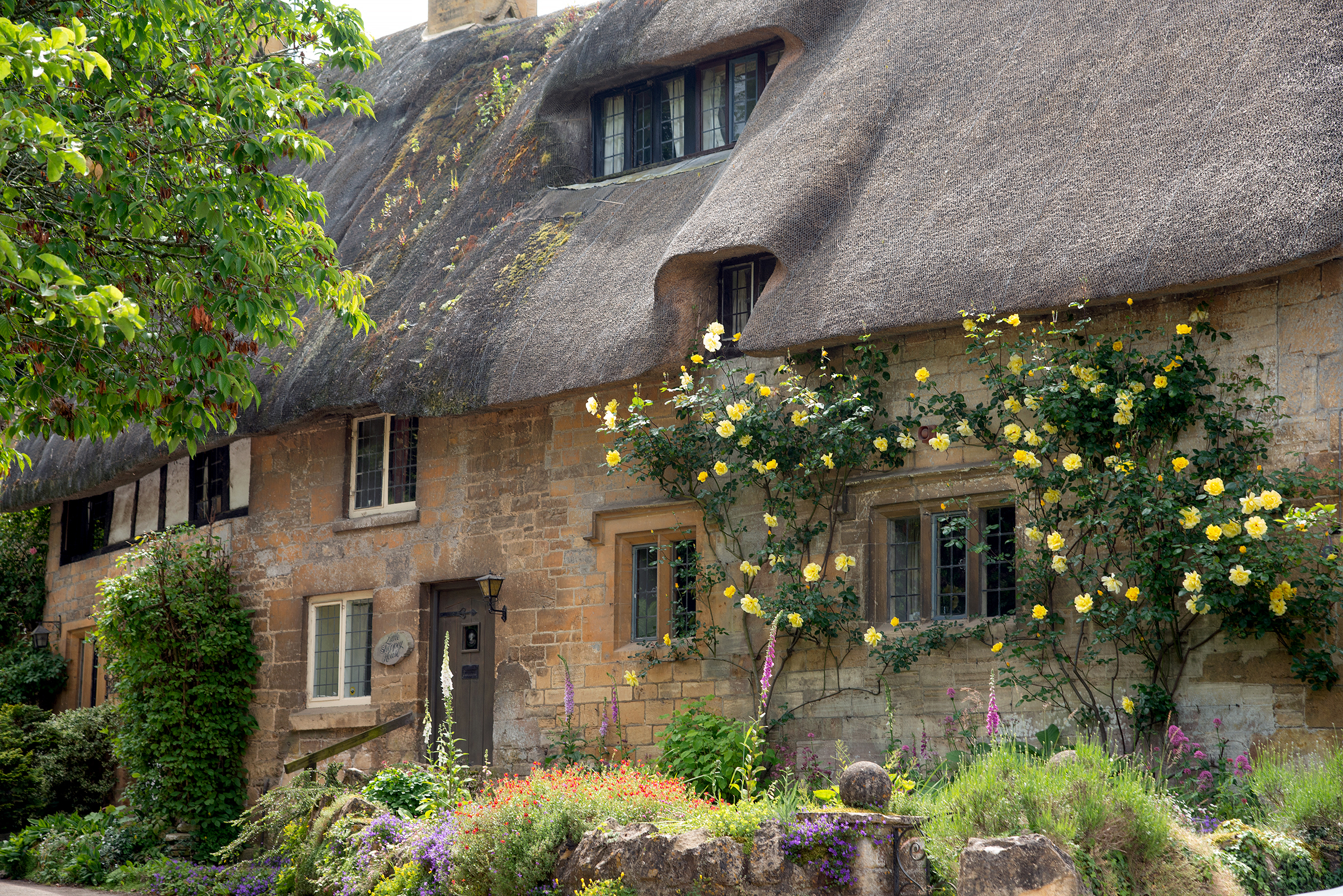
Sheppey Corner Cottage

Sheppey Corner is a thatched cottage built about 1650 at the top of the High Street. Like the rest of the village it is built of Cotswold stone. It was built as one large house and barn but was altered in the mid 18th century and then, extensively altered in 1922 for then-owner Sir P. Stott. It is now divided into three cottages that are Grade II Listed: Little Sheppey House, No 3 and Pixie Cottage.

=== Stanton Court ===
A Grade II listed building Stanton Court is a 14,644 square feet (1,360.5 m^{2}) Jacobean manor house built for the Izod family in the "early and later part" of the 17th century. It passed to their relatives, the Wynniatt family, in the early 18th century, who then extended the house adding a wing with Georgian sitting room. The house was extensively restored for Sir Philip Stott in the 20th century. As of 2023, it is for sale with a guide price of £14 million.

=== The Mount Inn ===
Though not listed, this very quaint 17th-century inn, atop a steep hill at the end of the village, is a popular spot for tourists because of its views over the Vale of Evesham and the Malvern Hills to the Black Mountains in Wales. It has an interesting history. The building was originally a farmhouse, known as "The Bank" until 1897 when it became a pub owned by Donnington Brewery and Richard Arkell. It was operated by the Troughton family until 1962. It was an off-licence facility for decades, known as "The Five Elms"; since alcoholic beverages could not be sold inside, the inn operator made cider in an outbuilding. Finally in 1947, the inn received its licence.

== Railway ==
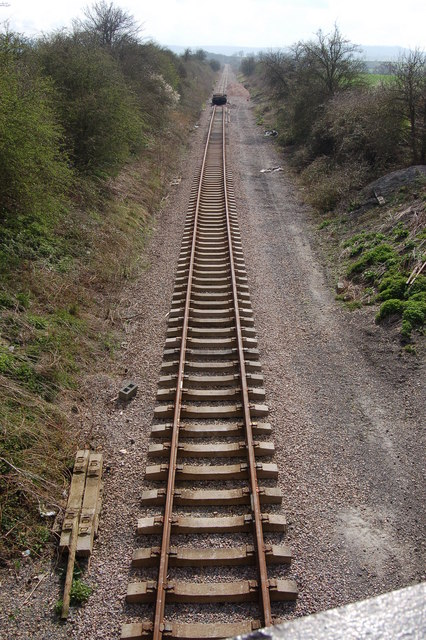
New track being laid for the restoration of the Gloucestershire Warwickshire Railway through Stanton parish

The Great Western Railway's main line between Stratford-upon-Avon and Cheltenham Spa Malvern Road was built through the parish between 1900 and 1904, passing about 0.5 miles (800 m) west of the village. The nearest station was Laverton Halt about 1 mile (1.6 km) north of Stanton. British Railways closed the line to passenger trains in 1960 and freight in 1976. The Gloucestershire Warwickshire Railway heritage railway is currently rebuilding the line.

By 2018, the line had reached beyond the Stanton Lane bridge.

== Notable residents ==
- Sir Philip Sidney Stott, 1st Baronet, English architect, civil engineer, surveyor and politician.
- Hastings Ismay, 1st Baron Ismay, British general and advisor to Winston Churchill
- Sue Barker, Tennis player and television presenter.

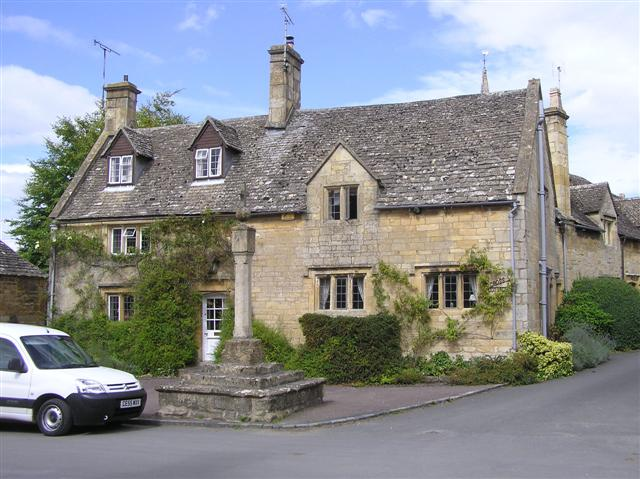
Stanton has a 17th-century sundial on the base of its former village cross. It is a Scheduled Ancient Monument. The cottages behind it are 17th- and 18th-century.

== Sources ==
- RCHME, ed. (1976). "Stanton". Ancient and Historical Monuments in the County of Gloucester Iron Age and Romano-British Monuments in the Gloucestershire Cotswolds. London: Royal Commission on the Historical Monuments of England. pp. 109–110.
- Verey, David (1970). Gloucestershire: The Cotswolds. The Buildings of England. Vol. 1. Harmondsworth: Penguin Books. pp. 412–414. ISBN 0-14-071040-X.
