= James William Best =

British Indian judge

Chief Judge of Mysore
- In office 4 November 1895 – 1907
- Preceded by: T. R. A. Thumboo Chetty
- Succeeded by: Stanley Ismay

Personal details
- Born: 14 March 1840 Madras, Madras Presidency
- Died: 14 October 1916 (aged 76) Sydney, Australia
- Education: Inner Temple
- Occupation: Judge

James William Best (14 March 1840 – 14 October 1916) was a British Indian judge and Chief Judge of the erstwhile High Court of Mysore.

== Career ==
Best was born at Madras in British India. He was the son of the Reverend James Kershaw Best, a missionary. He was educated at Wimborne Grammar School and Inner Temple. Thereafeter Best entered the Indian Civil Service in 1861. He served in several administrative branch including Judicial Department of the Madras Presidency. Best was appointed as judge of the Madras High Court in 1893. On 4 November 1895, he became the Chief Judge of Mysore High Court, under the princely state of Mysore. He later travelled to Australia and died in Sydney, New South Wales, in 1916.
