= Stanley Ismay =

British civil servant and judge (1848–1914)

Sir Stanley Ismay
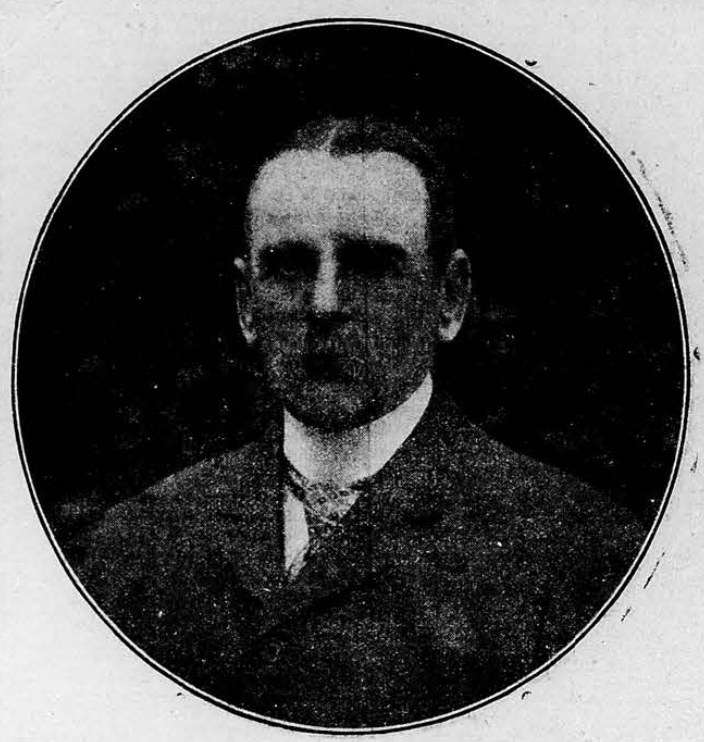
- Born: 1 July 1848; Milton-next-Sittingbourne, Kent
- Died: 8 June 1914 (aged 65); Ootacamund, India
- Occupations: Barrister, judge and colonial administrator
- Spouse: Beatrice Read
- Relatives: Hastings Ismay, 1st Baron Ismay

Sir Stanley Ismay, KCSI (1 July 1848 – 8 June 1914) was a British civil servant and judge in British India, where he spent most of his career in the Central Provinces, acting as Chief Commissioner in 1906. After resigning from the civil service, he was a member of the Imperial Legislative Council 1905–1908, and Chief Judge of the Chief Court of Mysore from 1908 to 1912.

== Career ==
Ismay was born in 1848, the son of William Ismay, of Milton-next-Sittingbourne, Kent, and educated at Bromsgrove School. He was also distant cousin to shipowner Thomas Henry Ismay.

He entered the Indian Civil Service in 1869, and arrived in India in November 1871 to take up the position of Assistant Commissioner in the Central Provinces. He was called to the Bar at Middle Temple in 1883. Following a year of special duties in Kalahandi State in 1882, he was appointed Registrar in the Judicial Commissioner′s Court in May 1884. He officiated as Inspector-General of Police and Jails in the provinces in 1885 and 1890, and published a book on Rules for the Superintendence and Management of Jails in the Central Provinces (1890). From December 1889 he was a Judge in the Small Causes Court in Jabalpur, and in January the following year he was appointed Deputy Commissioner. In January 1892 he was appointed an additional Judge in the Sessions Court and from June 1895 a Divisional Judge. After officiating as Judicial Commissioner in the Central Provinces in February 1895, he was permanently appointed to this position in June 1897. The position of Judicial Commissioner was the chief judicial appellate authority in the province, and he occasionally acted as Chief Commissioner (the highest civil authority in the province) when the holder of that office was not present, including in the absence of John Ontario Miller for three months in 1906. He retired from the Civil Service in 1906.

Ismay served as an Additional Member of the Imperial Legislative Council from 1905 until 1908. He was appointed Chief Judge (similar to Chief Justice) of the Chief Court of Mysore in 1908, and served as such until 1912. The Chief Court of Mysore was renamed High Court of Mysore in 1920, and is now the Karnataka High Court.

He was lieutenant-colonel commanding the Nagpur Volunteer Rifles.

Ismay was appointed a Companion of the Order of the Star of India (CSI) in the 1901 Birthday Honours list on 9 November 1901, and promoted to a Knight Commander (KCSI) in the Order in the 1911 Delhi Durbar Honours.

He died at Ootacamund in India on 8 June 1914.

== Family ==
Ismay married, in 1875, Beatrice Ellen Read, daughter of Hastings Read. Lady Ismay died on 8 May 1932. They had two sons and two daughters:

- Florence Edith Ismay (b.1876), who married Edward Robert Kaye Blenkinsop, CIE, Chief Secretary of the Central Provinces, and had children including Edward Blenkinsop, Frederick Blenkinsop and Rupert Blenkinsop.
- Stanley Claude Ismay (b.1878), who married in Calcutta in 1906 Grace Margaret McBean, daughter of William McBean, of Inverness, and lived in Calcutta.
- Beatrice Maud Ismay (b.1883), who married 1st Major Henry Newton Kelly, 33rd Punjabis, and 2nd (after his death) Lieutenant-Colonel Henry Malcolm Jerome Alves, DSO (1883–1940), of the Royal Artillery.
- Hastings Ismay (1887–1965), was a British Indian Army officer and diplomat, who was created Baron Ismay, and served as first Secretary General of NATO.

Government offices
Preceded by James William Best	Chief Judge of the Chief Court of Mysore; 1908-1912	Succeeded by P. S. Krishna Row
