= Hastings Ismay, 1st Baron Ismay =

British general, politician and diplomat (1887–1965)

General The Right Honourable The Lord Ismay KG GCB CH DSO PC DL
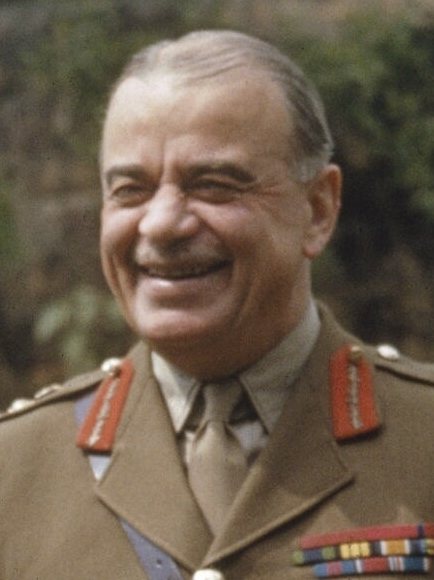
- Ismay in 1945

1st Secretary General of NATO
- In office 24 March 1952 – 16 May 1957
- Preceded by: Office established
- Succeeded by: Paul-Henri Spaak

Secretary of State for Commonwealth Relations
- In office 28 October 1951 – 12 March 1952
- Prime Minister: Winston Churchill
- Preceded by: Patrick Gordon Walker
- Succeeded by: The Marquess of Salisbury

Member of the House of Lords Lord Temporal
- In office 6 February 1947 – 17 December 1965; Hereditary peerage
- Preceded by: Peerage created
- Succeeded by: Peerage extinct

Personal details
- Born: Hastings Lionel Ismay; 21 June 1887 Nainital, North-Western Provinces, British India (now Nainital, Uttarakhand, India)
- Died: 17 December 1965 (aged 78) Wormington Grange, Stanton, Gloucestershire, England
- Spouse: Laura Kathleen Clegg
- Children: 3
- Parent: Stanley Ismay
- Nickname: Pug

Military service
- Allegiance: United Kingdom
- Branch/service: British Indian Army; British Army
- Years of service: 1905–1946
- Rank: General
- Battles/wars: First World War; Second World War
- Awards: Knight Companion of the Order of the Garter; Knight Grand Cross of the Order of the Bath; Member of the Order of the Companions of Honour; Companion of the Distinguished Service Order; Mentioned in Despatches

General Hastings Lionel "Pug" Ismay, 1st Baron Ismay (21 June 1887 – 17 December 1965) was a British politician, diplomat and general in the British Indian Army who was the first secretary general of NATO. He also was Winston Churchill's chief military assistant during the Second World War.

Ismay was born in Nainital, India, in 1887, and educated in the United Kingdom at Charterhouse School and the Royal Military College, Sandhurst. After Sandhurst, he joined the British Indian Army as an officer of the 21st Prince Albert Victor's Own Cavalry. During the First World War, he served with the Camel Corps in British Somaliland, where he joined in the British fight against Somali military leader and founder of the anti-colonial Dervish movement Mohammed Abdullah Hassan. In 1925, Ismay became an Assistant Secretary of the Committee of Imperial Defence (CID). After being promoted to the rank of colonel, he served as the military secretary for Lord Willingdon, the Viceroy of India, then returned to the CID as Deputy Secretary in 1936.

On 1 August 1938, shortly before the outbreak of the Second World War, Ismay became the committee's secretary and began planning for the impending war. In May 1940, when Winston Churchill became Prime Minister of the United Kingdom, he selected Ismay as his chief military assistant and staff officer. In that capacity, Ismay served as the principal link between Churchill and the Chiefs of Staff Committee. Ismay also accompanied Churchill to many of the Allied war conferences. For Ismay's advice and aid, "Churchill owed more, and admitted that he owed more" to him "than to anybody else, military or civilian, in the whole of the war."

After the end of the war, Ismay remained in the army for another year, and helped to reorganise the Ministry of Defence. He then retired from the military and served as Lord Mountbatten of Burma's chief of staff in India, helping to oversee its partition. From 1948 to 1951, he served as chairman of the council of the Festival of Britain, helping to organise and promote the event. Then, in 1951, when Churchill again became prime minister, he appointed Ismay Secretary of State for Commonwealth Relations.

Ismay accepted the position, but resigned after only six months to become the first secretary general of NATO in 1952. While Secretary General, Ismay is also credited as having been the first person to say that the purpose of NATO was "to keep the Soviet Union out, the Americans in, and the Germans down," a saying that has since become a common way to describe the dynamics of NATO. He served in this role until 1957, and helped establish and define the position. After retiring from NATO, Ismay wrote his memoirs, The Memoirs of General the Lord Ismay, served on a variety of corporate boards, and co-chaired the Ismay–Jacob Committee, which reorganised the Ministry of Defence once again. He died on 17 December 1965, at his home, Wormington Grange, Gloucestershire.

== Early life ==
Ismay was born in Nainital, Kumaon, India, on 21 June 1887. His father, Sir Stanley Ismay, was a member of the Viceroy's Legislative Council, and his mother, Beatrice Ellen (née Read), was the daughter of an Army colonel, Hastings Read. Ismay began his education in Britain at the Charterhouse School, and his parents hoped that after completing his education there he would attend Cambridge and enter the civil service.

Ismay, however, "had a sneaking desire to be a cavalry soldier", and after doing poorly on his final examinations at Charterhouse, he was ineligible to attend Cambridge. As a result, he entered the Royal Military College, Sandhurst, in 1904. Ismay would later write: "Sandhurst never meant nearly so much to me as Charterhouse had", but he enjoyed his time at the college and studied alongside many men who went on to become important military officers, including Lord Gort, Edgar Ludlow-Hewitt and Cyril Newall.

=== Indian Army ===
After completing the course at Sandhurst, Ismay was placed fourth overall in its examinations and was commissioned as a second lieutenant in the Indian Army. Ismay was then attached to the Gloucestershire Regiment of the British Army in Ambala, where he served a one-year mandatory apprenticeship. After leaving the regiment, Ismay did not immediately find a place in the Indian cavalry, so he spent nine months floating among positions with various British and Indian units.

In 1907, Ismay found a permanent position in the Indian cavalry, joining the 21st Prince Albert Victor's Own Cavalry, based at Risalpur. Ismay thoroughly enjoyed his time with the regiment, describing it as "blissful." In 1908, he saw his first action with the regiment, when it was sent into Afghanistan, pursuing Mohmand raiders who had taken several Hindu women as hostages. Immediately after Ismay's regiment returned from action, he was hospitalised in Peshawar due to heat stroke, but he recovered quickly and, along with the rest of his regiment, received the India General Service Medal.

In 1910, after a reorganisation of the Indian Army, Ismay's regiment moved from Risalpur to Jhelum, further from the frontier. Shortly thereafter, Ismay was appointed the adjutant of his regiment, a position which he held for four years, during which time he also read voraciously and developed a great admiration for Winston Churchill, whom he sought to emulate.

== Somaliland ==
In early 1914, just before Ismay's appointment as adjutant was set to expire, he met C. A. L Howard, another British officer serving in India, who told him about an opportunity to serve with the King's African Rifles in British Somaliland. Ismay decided that this was "just the sort of job that [he] wanted," and applied immediately. Due to his reputation "as a thorough and dependable officer of sound judgement," Ismay was appointed second in command of the Somaliland Camel Corps, a cavalry unit led by Thomas Cubitt.

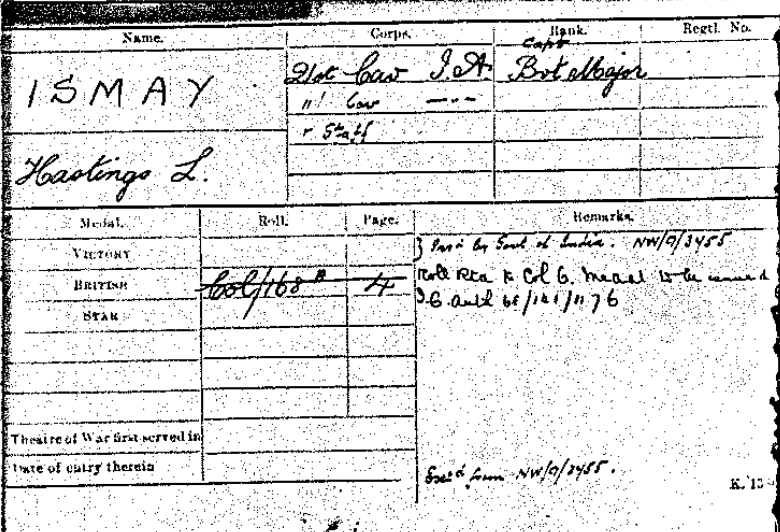
A medal card showing Ismay's entitlement to the British War Medal.

Ismay left India for Somaliland in late July 1914, and arrived on 9 August, shortly after the outbreak of the First World War in Europe. Like other officers in Somaliland, Ismay was "unhappy at being left out of the great war" and repeatedly asked for a transfer to the European front. In the end, however, Ismay's superiors decided that he was "so indispensable that, despite his longing for action in Europe, he was retained in Somaliland until 1920."

In Somaliland, the Camel Corps and other British soldiers were ordered to subdue an uprising by Mohammed Abdullah Hassan, pejoratively referred to by the British as the "Mad Mullah", who had been fighting against them for more than twenty years. Ismay's commander, Thomas Cubitt, was determined to end the rebellion forcefully and quickly, so on 17 November 1914, he launched a major assault against Hassan's fortress at Shimber Berris. In the attack, Ismay fought closely alongside Adrian Carton de Wiart, later an important British officer in both World Wars. Not long after the attack on Shimber Berris, however, the Camel Corps received orders from London "forbidding all offensive operations in Somaliland", due to the misfortunes of the Army elsewhere. As a result of this order, British operations were limited for the duration of the First World War, and Ismay's unit undertook no further major offensives.

Despite limited British activity, a few operations combined with the effort of local forces led to "a drastic weakening" of Hassan's forces by 1918. Thus, after the armistice ending the First World War, the government sent Major General Arthur Hoskins to take control of the forces in Somaliland and defeat Hassan conclusively in battle. After Hoskins arrived, his initial plan for dealing with Hassan focussed on the use of the newly formed Royal Air Force, so Ismay and the Camel Corps were consigned to a minor role. Hoskins's plans, however, were found "overscaled and far too costly", so they were shelved throughout most of 1918 and 1919.

In October 1919, plans for Hoskins's operation were finally approved, and on 21 January 1920, the attack against Hassan commenced. After several days of bombing, Ismay was ordered to lead an assault by the Camel Corps against Hassan's fortress at Jid Ali. On 27 January, Ismay's forces first attempted the attack and were repulsed by strong resistance. That night, however, Hassan and his forces fled Jid Ali to take refuge in the countryside. Ismay was assigned to track down and capture Hassan, but he "had no idea of where he was", and was forced to begin a large search.

Ismay pursued Hassan for nearly two weeks, and managed to capture many members of his family and people close to him, including seven of his sons. Hassan himself managed to evade Ismay and on 12 February, the effort to capture him was called off. Though Hassan was never captured, his power was broken, and he died in December 1920 of influenza. For his service in the effort against Hassan, Ismay received the Distinguished Service Order and was twice mentioned in despatches.

== Interwar years ==
In April 1920, Ismay left Somaliland for England. While en route, he received word that he had been nominated for a place at the Indian Army's Staff College, Quetta. Depressed by the loss of life and destruction of the First World War, Ismay turned down the nomination, and "was even seriously thinking of resigning [his] commission" in the Army. After arriving in London, Ismay was given twelve months of medical leave, and decided to stay in the army. He then attempted to reclaim his seat at the Staff College, but was told that it had already been given to someone else.

=== Marriage and service in India ===
While on medical leave, Ismay met Laura Kathleen Clegg, with whom he quickly fell in love. The two were engaged only three weeks after meeting. After four months, however, Ismay was proclaimed fit for duty, despite his remaining eight months of leave, and ordered back to India, where he rejoined his old regiment. His time back in India was relatively quiet, as there was "no serious fighting" in the area of his regiment at the time. In February 1921, Ismay took the qualifying exam for the Staff College in Rawalpindi, and passed, earning himself a seat for the next year.

In April, Ismay returned to London on leave, and married Clegg, with whom he eventually had three daughters. Ismay remained in London until February 1922, when he entered the Staff College at Quetta. Ismay excelled at the Staff College, and its commandant called him "one of the two best, if not the best, of the students who have passed through my hands." In his final thesis at the Staff College, Ismay correctly predicted that the next European war would be a total war, but he incorrectly predicted that cavalry would continue to play a role in future warfare.

After the Staff College, Ismay became Deputy Assistant Quartermaster General of the Indian Army. In that position, he worked closely with Claude Auchinleck, beginning a long-standing personal and professional relationship between the two. Ismay found that his work as Deputy Assistant Quartermaster General "was a valuable experience", but did not enjoy it.

=== Service in England ===
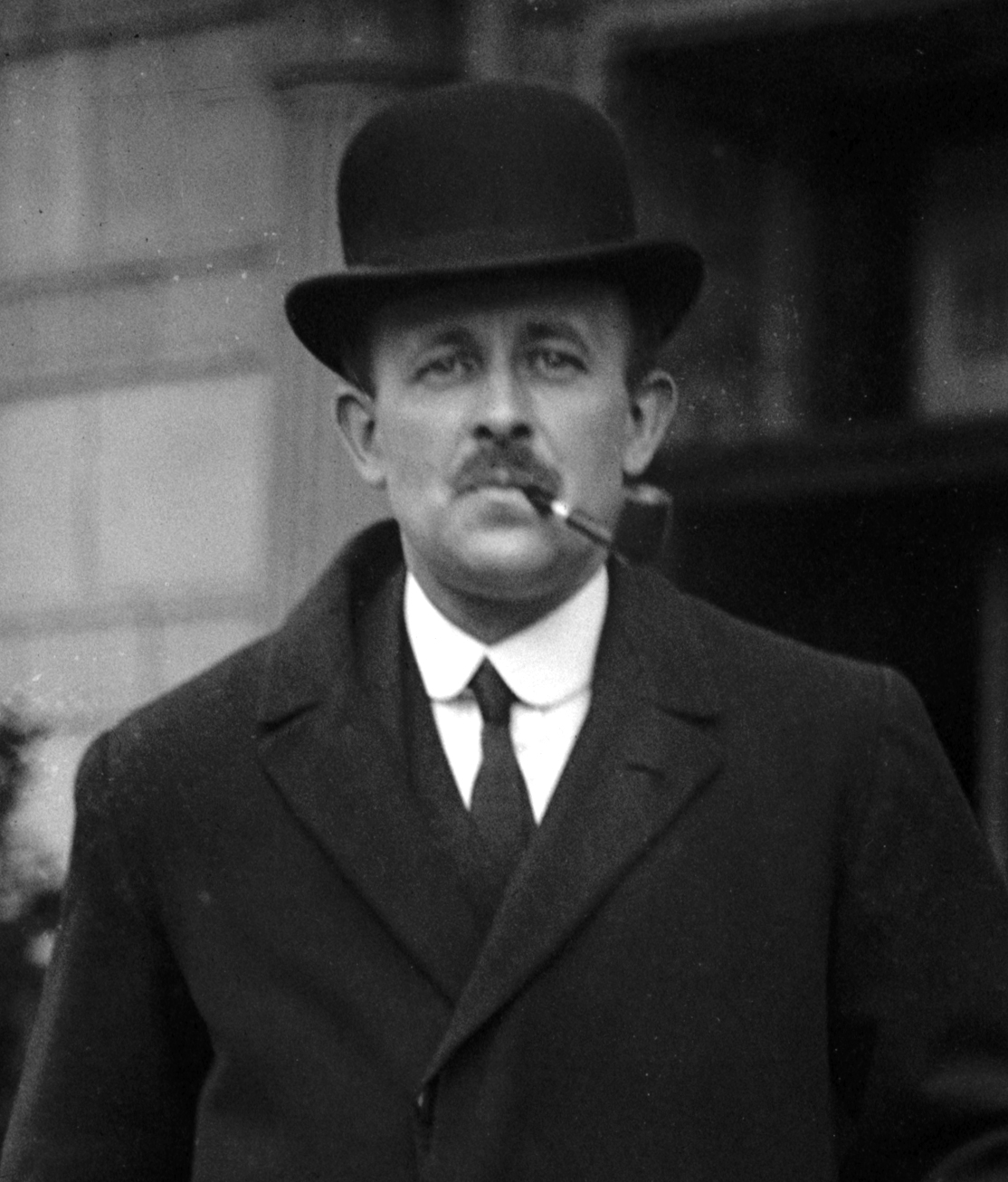
Maurice Hankey, Secretary of the Committee of Imperial Defence

In 1924, Air Vice-Marshal Philip Game suggested to Ismay that he apply for a seat at the RAF Staff College, Andover. Although Ismay "had no desire to learn to be a pilot", he was happy for the opportunity to return to England, and went to study at the college. After completing the programme, he was approached about the possibility of serving as an Assistant Secretary of the Committee of Imperial Defence (CID) under Maurice Hankey. Ismay gladly accepted the position, starting work in December 1925. In the six months between finishing the Staff College and beginning at the CID, Ismay returned to India and held a staff position at the headquarters of the Indian Army in Simla.

As Assistant Secretary, Ismay directed several of the CID's subcommittees, including those for Censorship and War Emergency Legislation, Principal Supply Officers, and Co-ordination of Departmental Action. As the Secretary of the Committee for the Co-ordination of Departmental Action, Ismay "was responsible for seeing that all plans and preparations made by Government Departments or sub-committees of the CID to meet the eventuality of war, were incorporated under appropriate headings in a document known as the War Book." This task ended up consuming most of Ismay's time as Assistant Secretary, and gave him "exceptional insight into the ways of Whitehall."

While serving as Assistant Secretary, Ismay made important friends and gained the backing of Hankey, by whom he was "greatly valued". Largely through Hankey's influence, Ismay was nominated as a Companion of the Order of the Bath in the Civil Division, an honour which he received in 1931.

=== Lord Willingdon and the War Office ===
In December 1930, after five years, Ismay left his position at the CID. He was promoted colonel and hoped to take command of the 12th Cavalry. Instead, he became the military secretary for Lord Willingdon, the newly appointed Viceroy of India.

In this role, Ismay served as the "unofficial link" between Willingdon and the Indian Army. He also led Willingdon's personal staff, and organised his many trips throughout India. Ismay was also responsible for Willingdon's safety, and took precautions after he was threatened by assassins. In December 1932, Ismay was informed that his service with Willingdon was over and that he was expected to take up a position in the War Office during the next year.

At the War Office, Ismay served as an intelligence officer with responsibility for the Middle East, Far East, the Americas, the Soviet Union, Poland and the Baltic States. Ismay enjoyed his work, and wrote that "intelligence is perhaps the most interesting of all Staff work." During his three years in the position, Ismay worked directly under Sir John Dill, who would later serve as the Chief of the Imperial General Staff.

== Committee of Imperial Defence ==
In 1936, Maurice Hankey became determined to "bring Ismay in as his deputy and eventual successor" at the CID. Hoping that the appointment would "strengthen the organization of the CID" and enhance its influence, Hankey offered Ismay the position of Deputy Secretary. Although the appointment meant that Ismay would probably never command troops again, he viewed it as an important opportunity and "accepted with scarcely a moment's hesitation." A week thereafter, Ismay received a letter offering him the command of a cavalry brigade in India, but declined, solidifying his choice to remain a staff officer.

As Deputy Secretary of the Committee of Imperial Defence, Ismay had broad responsibilities, and was "concerned with every aspect of planning and preparation for a war which seemed imminent." Ismay dealt extensively with a variety of matters and focussed much of his attention on the preparation of anti-aircraft defences and co-ordination among the military services. As the crisis in Europe escalated, however, Hankey announced his intention to retire in June 1938. Hankey hoped that one person, preferably Ismay, would inherit all of the positions he had occupied, including Secretary of the CID, clerk of the Privy Council, and secretary to the Cabinet, but the prime minister, Neville Chamberlain, decided that the positions should be split and assigned to different people.

In the end, Ismay was named only to the position of Secretary of the Committee of Imperial Defence, effective 1 August 1938. Ismay assumed the position scarcely more than a year before the outbreak of the Second World War, and the war totally dominated his time in office. Soon after Ismay took office, Hitler initiated a crisis over the Sudetenland. While Chamberlain was at the Munich Conference attempting to resolve the crisis, Ismay ordered the digging of trenches in London as protection against air attacks, should war occur. Ismay later said that he thought Britain should have gone to war at Munich instead of waiting, but said nothing at the time. As it became increasingly clear that war was inevitable in 1939, Ismay also prepared for a "smooth, simple and practically instantaneous" transition from the Committee of Imperial Defence to the War Cabinet, or whatever other wartime authority the government might choose.

== Second World War ==
With the outbreak of the Second World War, the CID was immediately absorbed into the War Cabinet as Ismay had planned. In the midst of the turmoil, Ismay was promoted to major-general, and began to work closely with Chamberlain, accompanying him on a visit to France in December 1939. Ismay disagreed with several Allied strategic choices, including the decision to try to stop the German advance in Belgium, but kept his doubts to himself.

=== Chiefs of Staff Committee ===
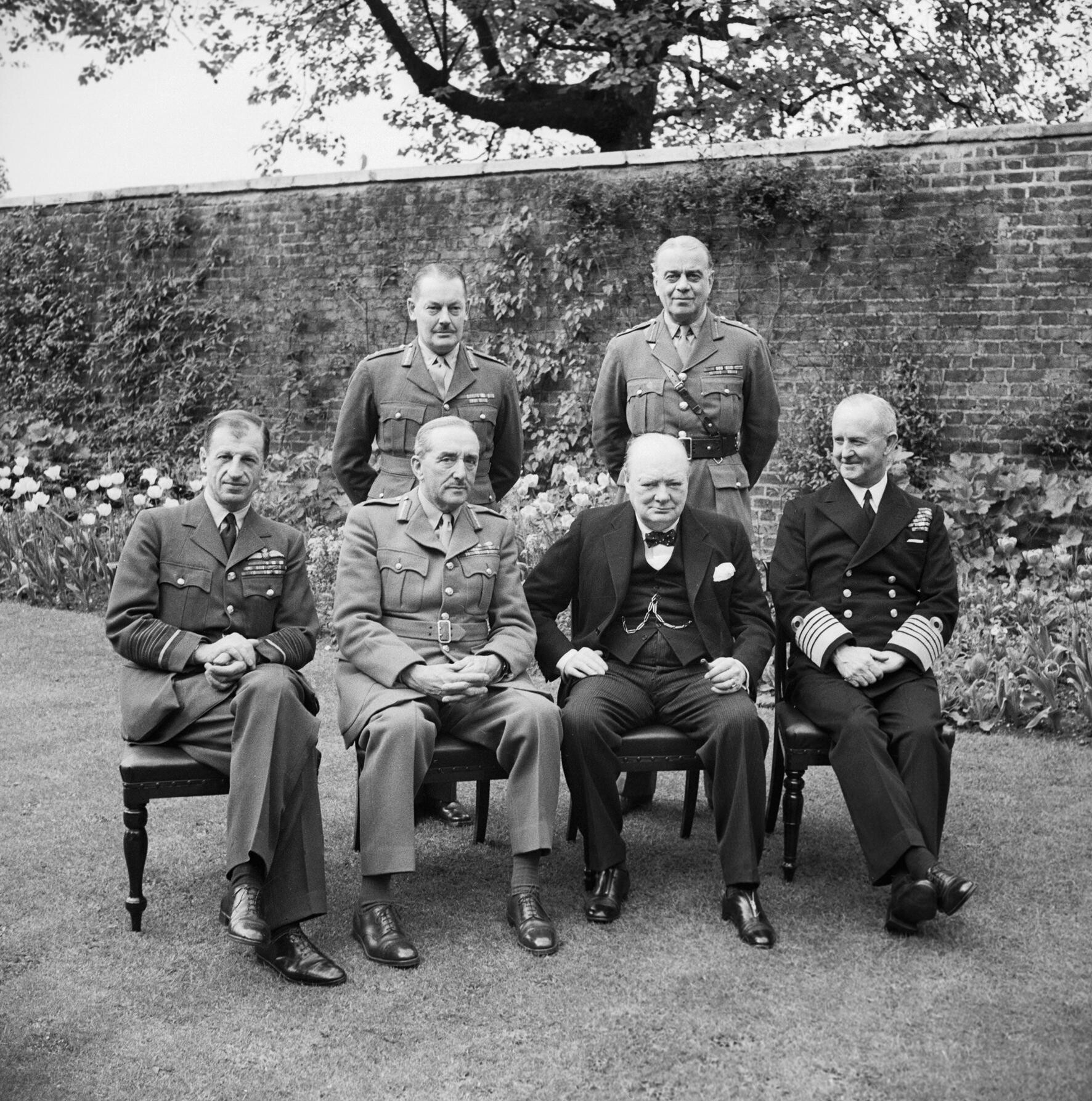
Winston Churchill with the Chiefs of Staff in 1945; Charles Portal (RAF), Alan Brooke (Army and CIGS); Andrew Cunningham (RN), Ismay (standing on the right) next to Leslie Hollis secretary to the committee

In April 1940, Winston Churchill took control of the Military Co-ordination Committee, charged with overseeing all of the military services. He selected Ismay as his chief staff officer, which also gave Ismay the additional responsibility of serving on the Chiefs of Staff Committee. While serving under Churchill had been a life-long dream for Ismay, he was initially skeptical about the duties of his new position, which seemed unclear and poorly defined.

On 10 May, after the beginning of the Battle of France, Chamberlain resigned, and Churchill became both prime minister and minister of defence. Ismay, who later called Churchill "the greatest War Prime Minister in our history," was "thrilled" by this development, and continued to act as Churchill's chief staff officer and military adviser. According to Churchill, the two developed a close "personal and official connection [that] was preserved unbroken and unweakened" throughout the war.

As part of this relationship, not long after Churchill became prime minister, he arranged for Ismay to be appointed Knight Commander of the Order of the Bath in June 1940. From the very moment he became prime minister, Churchill "relied heavily on General Pug Ismay," who provided a crucial bridge to the military establishment. Ismay served as the "principal assistant to Mr. Churchill in his capacity as Minister of Defence," continued to serve as the secretary of the Imperial Defence Chiefs of Staff Committee, and became Deputy Secretary of the War Cabinet.

Ismay was crucial to running the war effort, as he was able to effectively link the military and civilian leadership. Jock Colville, Churchill's private secretary, wrote that Ismay had the "tact, patience, and skill in promoting compromise" needed to keep the war running smoothly." Ismay had the additional advantage of being admired by the Service Chiefs for his long and distinguished record as a soldier.

In his role, Ismay handled "nearly all military messages" from Churchill to the Service Chiefs. Ismay also gave Churchill advice on military matters, and often "begged him to be reasonable," when he contemplated foolish actions, believing that Churchill's greatest fault was his "impetuous nature and impatience with opposition." When the Chiefs of Staff found Churchill's demands unfeasible, Ismay took the role of "converting the Prime Minister" to their viewpoint.

=== Allied conferences ===
As Churchill's chief military adviser, Ismay frequently attended wartime conferences and meetings of the Allies and accompanied other British leaders, such as Foreign Minister Anthony Eden, on their travels. Ismay's travel to the conferences began in 1941, when he went with Lord Beaverbrook to the first Moscow Conference. Because British participation in the conference was a secret, Ismay faked influenza to explain his absence from London while it was taking place. The Conference was also the first time that Ismay worked closely with the Americans, whom he found "quite congenial."

Ismay would continue to work closely with the Americans throughout the remainder of the war, and he accompanied Churchill on his 1942 trip to the United States. Shortly after their return, American General Dwight D. Eisenhower arrived in Britain to command the American forces. He established close relations with Ismay, who liked him greatly, and assisted him in coordinating with both British forces and the Cabinet. Eisenhower thought highly of Ismay, remembering him for his "stalwart support", and noting, "He was one of those men whose great ability condemned him throughout the war to a staff position. Consequently his name may be forgotten; but the contributions he made to the winning of the war were equal to those of many whose names became household words."

Not long after Eisenhower arrived, on 16 August 1942, Ismay was promoted to the rank of lieutenant-general. Around the same time, his good relations with the Americans were recognised by others in the government. Thus, in November 1942, when Eleanor Roosevelt visited Britain, Lady Ismay was chosen to host her for one night of her stay.

=== 1943 conferences ===
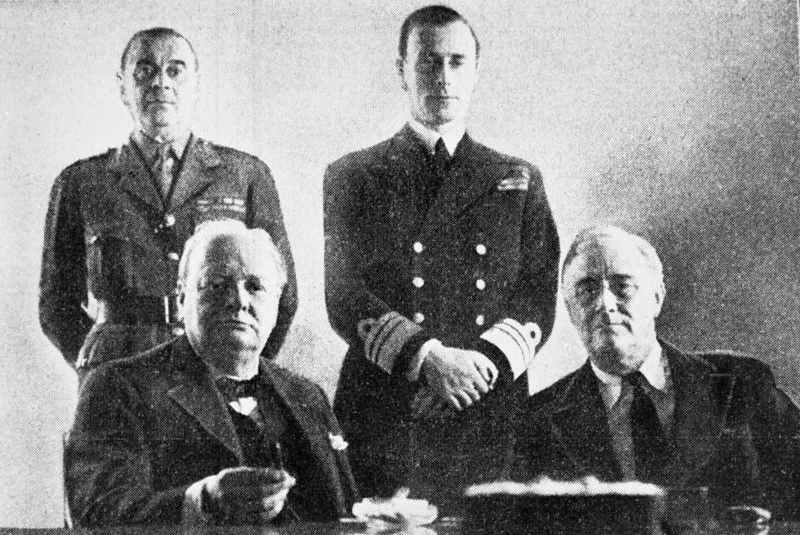
Ismay (top left) with Roosevelt, Churchill and Admiral Mountbatten at the Casablanca Conference

In January 1943, Ismay accompanied Churchill to the Casablanca Conference. Ismay attended nearly all of the proceedings of the Conference, and helped work towards consensus where the Americans and British disagreed on issues. Ismay was also appointed to the committee which wrote the formal report of the conference. After the conference, Ismay visited the American headquarters in Algiers to meet with Eisenhower, and helped resolve some differences of opinion between Eisenhower and his British colleagues.

After Casablanca, Ismay accompanied Churchill to the third Washington Conference in May 1943. At the conference, Ismay first met the American admiral William D. Leahy, who is often described as his American counterpart. The two developed a friendly relationship, and Leahy wrote in his memoirs: "General Sir Hastings Ismay became my favorite, perhaps because his position closely paralleled my own."

After the Washington Conference came the Quebec Conference in August 1943. Once again, Ismay attended along with Churchill. The Quebec Conference was the first time that the Allied leaders discussed the full details of Operation Overlord, so Ismay spent much of his time explaining details of the operation to Churchill and other leaders. During the conference, Ismay also observed that Dudley Pound "had had a breakdown". He took the information to Churchill who demanded Pound's resignation a week later.

Shortly after returning from Quebec, Ismay participated in his next conference, travelling with Anthony Eden to the Moscow Conference in October and November, where he served as Eden's top military adviser. At the conference, Ismay handled all of the Soviet questions about the planning for Operation Overlord, and met Joseph Stalin personally for the first time. After the conference, Ismay wrote that he "was optimistic about [sic] post-war relations with Russia," showing his belief that the meeting had gone well.

Only four days after returning from the Moscow Conference, Ismay left England again for the Cairo Conference and Tehran Conference with Churchill. One major source of conflict at the Cairo Conference was an American proposal to appoint an overall commander for the strategic bombing of Germany. Ismay and the British were strongly opposed, and Ismay wrote a long paper against the idea, which became the basis of British policy on the subject. At Tehran, Ismay helped to argue the case for Operation Overlord, but immediately after the conference he developed bronchitis and returned to England by ship, scrapping his other plans for the trip.

=== 1944–1945 ===
In the first several months of 1944, Ismay spent almost all of his time planning for the Normandy Landings. As part of the planning, Ismay personally coordinated the plans for Operation Bodyguard and Operation Fortitude, which were designed to deceive the Germans about the planned Normandy landings. In March, Duncan Sandys, Churchill's son-in-law, told Ismay that Basil Liddell Hart, a noted strategist and historian, had somehow discovered the secret plans for the Normandy landings. This development had the potential to compromise the entire operation, so Ismay personally interviewed Liddell Hart, who claimed to have simply "worked it all out for himself" without any access to secret information. After their interview, Ismay directed the matter to MI5, who never found evidence of wrongdoing, although it is suspected that Liddell Hart may in fact have received information from military planners.

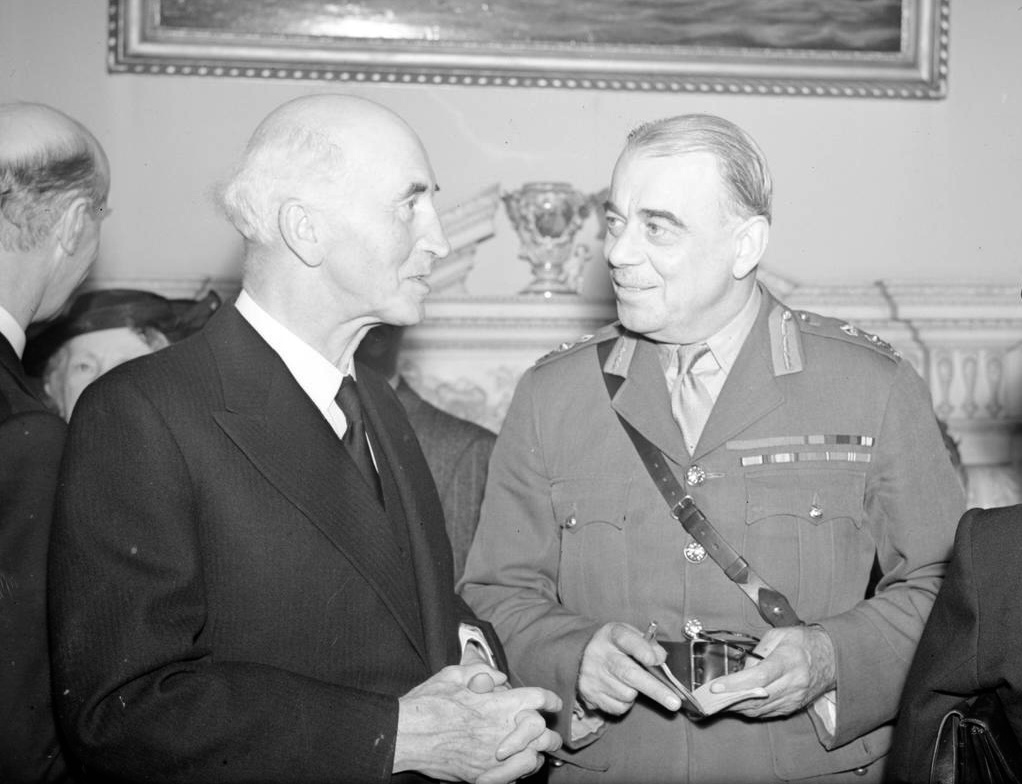
Ismay with Sir John Simon, the Lord Chancellor in Churchill's government, in 1945

On 20 May 1944, less than a month before the Normandy Landings were scheduled to take place, Ismay was promoted to the rank of full general. After the successful D-Day landings, King George VI decided to visit the troops in Normandy, and selected Ismay to accompany him on the visit. In September, Ismay accompanied Churchill to the Second Quebec Conference. Ismay also accompanied Churchill on his visits to Moscow and Paris in late 1944.

In February 1945, Ismay attended the Yalta Conference. He found the conference different from the previous ones where "the military element had been the prima donna, occupying the centre of the stage." Instead, at Yalta, political issues took precedence, leaving Ismay and other military advisers "waiting for calls that never came".

On VE Day, Ismay found it "quite impossible to be completely happy about the future," due to the lingering Japanese threat, and the rising threat of the Soviet Union. Nonetheless, he was happy to be one of only three men to hold the same high government position throughout the war in Europe, along with Edward Bridges, 1st Baron Bridges and the King.

== Post-war military service ==
After VE Day, Ismay accompanied Churchill to the Potsdam Conference. Like Yalta, the conference focussed primarily on political issues, so there was little for Ismay to do. After Clement Attlee defeated Churchill in the 1945 election, becoming prime minister, Ismay kept his position, working with Attlee at the conference, but remained loyal to Churchill. Ismay and Churchill remained friends for the remainder of their lives, and Ismay even helped Churchill write his memoirs, reviewing and commenting on each chapter of his manuscript.

Shortly after the Potsdam Conference, the war in Asia ended on VJ Day. After this victory, Ismay "would have liked to retire at once", but at Attlee's request he remained in the military for another year. Before continuing work, however, Ismay travelled to New York on 6 September, for a six-week vacation; he received a warm welcome.

Over the next year, Ismay worked largely on the issue of reform for the Ministry of Defence. From December 1945 to February 1946, Ismay worked with a small committee to draft the Statement Relating to Defence, which formed the basis of reforms implemented by Attlee later that year. For his role, Ismay became known as the "'chief architect' of the post-war Ministry of Defence."

During the year following the war, Ismay received many honours for his service. In August 1945, as part of Churchill's resignation honours, he was appointed to the Order of the Companions of Honour, an honour rarely bestowed on soldiers. The next January, he received the Legion of Merit from the United States. He was promoted Knight Grand Cross of the Order of the Bath in June. Finally, he was named the chairman of the Council of the Royal National Institute for the Blind.

In November 1946, Ismay announced his intention to retire. Attlee accepted his retirement, effective on 31 December 1946. Immediately after retiring, in the 1947 New Year Honours, Ismay was created a baron taking the title Baron Ismay, of Wormington in the County of Gloucester. He accepted the barony and took his seat in the House of Lords in February.

== Partition of India ==
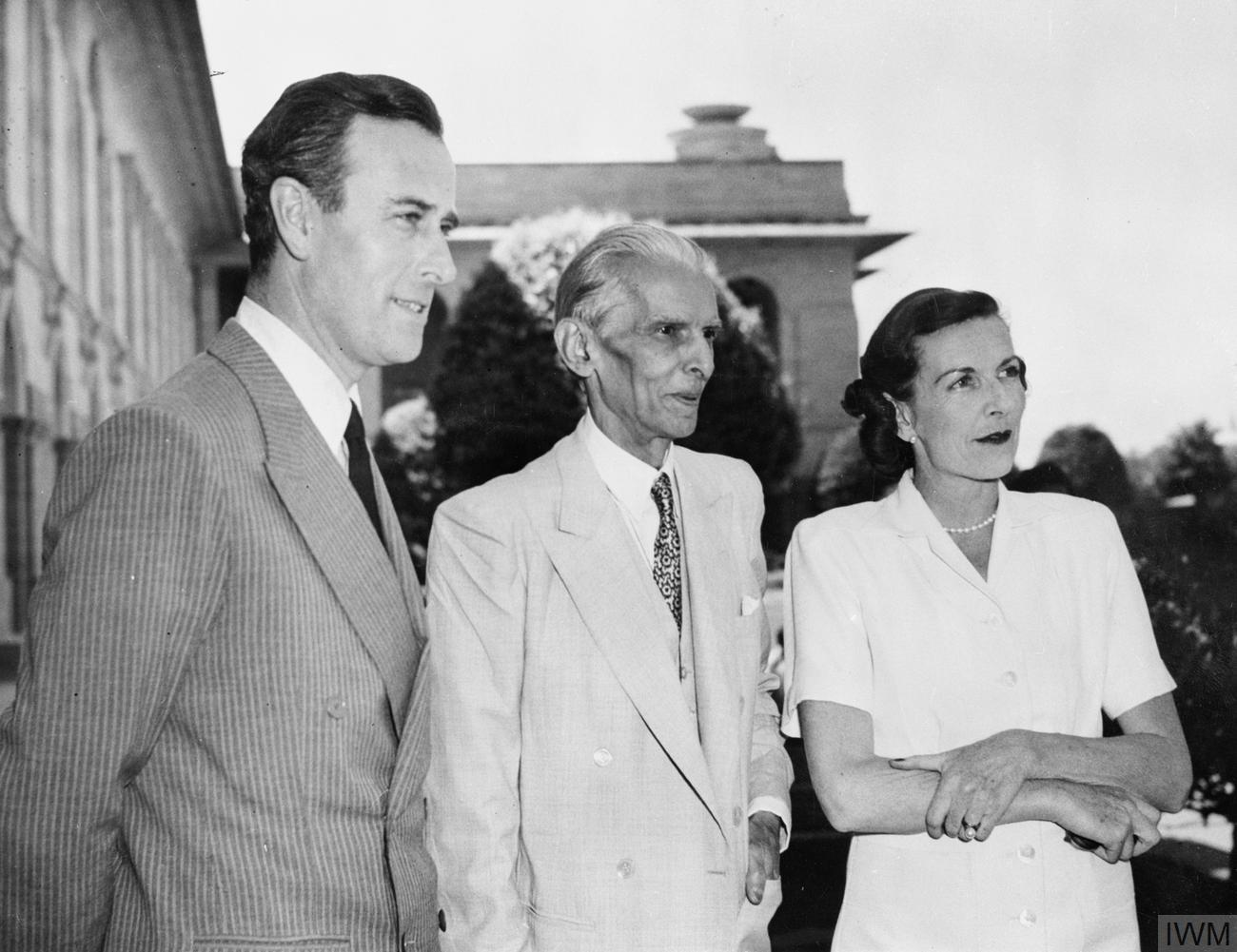
Lord Mountbatten of Burma, the last Viceroy of India, with his wife and Pakistani leader Muhammad Ali Jinnah

Shortly after Ismay's retirement, Lord Mountbatten of Burma was appointed as the last British Viceroy of India and Ismay offered to serve as his chief of staff. Thus, in March 1947, Ismay left with Mountbatten for India to help preside over its transition to independence. After arriving in India, Ismay soon came to the conclusion that the situation there was dire, heading for civil war, and told Mountbatten that "India was a ship on fire in mid-ocean with ammunition in her hold."

When Ismay and Mountbatten arrived, they were committed to preserving a unified India, but Ismay soon realised "that the Moslem League would not agree to any plan which did not provide for the creation of Pakistan as an independent sovereign state." In April, after several unsuccessful meetings with Muhammad Ali Jinnah, Mountbatten came to the same conclusion and began drawing up plans for the partition.

Over the next month Mountbatten finalised his partition plan, and on 2 May 1947, he sent Ismay back to London to present it to the British government. Ismay presented the plan to the Prime Minister and Cabinet, casting partition as a Hobson's choice. Ismay stayed in England for the next month, and helped to alter the plan based on the cabinet's suggestions, before returning to India on 31 May.

Once the partition plan had been accepted, Ismay worked on implementing the details. In particular, Ismay dealt with the issue of dividing the Indian Army. Based on his own experiences and love of the Indian Army, Ismay did his "utmost to persuade" the leaders of the new Indian and Pakistani states not to separate the army immediately. His efforts failed due to the opposition of Jinnah.

Ismay also travelled to Kashmir to ask Hari Singh to hold an immediate referendum over whether his territory would join India or Pakistan. Once again, Ismay was unsuccessful and Singh "changed the subject" each time that Ismay tried to discuss the referendum. Throughout the period immediately following independence, Ismay also tried to ensure that stories printed in the Indian and Pakistani press about the partition were accurate, but once again he was largely unsuccessful.

The situation in India continued to deteriorate throughout the summer and autumn of 1947. Nevertheless, Ismay and Mountbatten had agreed that Ismay would remain in his position for only three to four months after partition. In December 1947, he left India to return to England. Shortly after his return, Ismay served briefly on the British delegation to the United Nations to deal with the Kashmir issue. Ismay played only a limited role, as the Pakistanis suspected him of pro-Indian sympathies.

== Festival of Britain ==
Shortly after Ismay returned from the United Nations, Prime Minister Attlee asked him to become the chairman of the Council of the Festival of Britain, scheduled to take place in 1951. Ismay accepted the offer, and on 10 March 1948, he officially took the position of chairman. The appointment was largely symbolic, and Ismay "was at least partly appointed to forestall potential criticism by his friend Winston Churchill."– according to Leventhal. The Council, however, wielded "slight, but not insignificant influence" and Ismay took his duties seriously.

Ismay helped to ensure that the festival would be truly national in character, rather than just confined to London. As such, in June 1949, he called together all of the mayors in Britain to discuss the festival; this was the first meeting of all British mayors since 1916. Ismay also publicly defended the large cost of the festival, and emphasised its historic nature, saying, "We are consciously and deliberately determined to make history." Once the festival opened, Ismay hosted various notable guests, including Margaret Truman, the daughter of US president Harry Truman.

== Secretary of State for Commonwealth Relations ==
In the 1951 general election held shortly after the conclusion of the Festival of Britain, Churchill's Conservative Party once again won a majority in Parliament, making Churchill Prime Minister for a second time. The day after the election, Churchill asked Ismay to become the Secretary of State for Commonwealth Relations in his cabinet. Ismay "was overjoyed at the prospect of serving under Churchill again" and accepted the post immediately. Although not a politician, Ismay was well-suited for the position because of his close relationships with the leaders of the commonwealth countries, largely the result of his work during the war.

As a result of his military background and experience, Ismay became "more closely involved in defence matters than is usual for a Secretary of State for Commonwealth Relations," and often served as de facto minister of defence and serving as temporary minister of defence until the permanent appointee, Harold Alexander, was able to take office. Through his close involvement in defence matters, Ismay began to be involved with the North Atlantic Treaty Organization. In January 1952, he accompanied Churchill to a meeting in Ottawa about the alliance, and in February 1952 he attended the NATO Lisbon Conference as the British Ministry of Defence representative. When leaving the conference, Ismay remarked to Alfred Gruenther, "this is the first that I have seen of NATO, and thank heaven it's the last."

== Secretary General of NATO ==
At the Lisbon Conference, the members of NATO agreed to appoint a secretary general who would direct the organisation's staff and serve as Vice-Chairman of the North Atlantic Council. The position was initially offered to Sir Oliver Franks, but he declined. As such, the allies scrambled to find someone else to take the position. Two weeks later, the countries agreed to ask Ismay to become secretary general at the suggestion of Churchill and Anthony Eden.

Eden asked Ismay to accept the position, but his response "was an immediate and emphatic negative," as he saw NATO as an overly bureaucratic and inefficient organisation and complained that the position of Secretary General was "divided and ill-defined." Churchill then personally asked Ismay to accept the position, telling him that "NATO provided the best, if not the only, hope of peace in our time." After further urging, Ismay reluctantly agreed to take the job. On 12 March 1952, the Atlantic Council officially passed a resolution appointing Ismay Secretary General, and he started work on 24 March.

Ismay's appointment to the position was well-received, enjoying the unanimous support of all the NATO members. The press and public also responded favourably. The Times wrote: "of all the candidates whose names have been mentioned, Lord Ismay would seem to have the strongest qualifications for the post." The New York Times applauded his "vast experience in military planning, strategy, and administration," and The Washington Post wrote that Ismay would bring NATO "great authority, experience and energy and a personal charm that can dissolve difficulties."

As the first Secretary General, Ismay was "assuming an entirely new role in the history of international organizations," and as such he helped to define the position itself. While Ismay "deemed it wise not to step too boldly in a political role" in disputes among the members, he asserted himself strongly on issues relevant to the organisation of NATO. From the very beginning of his time in office, Ismay worked to empower the permanent representatives to NATO, and emphasised that they had the same legal authority to make decisions as the NATO foreign ministers.

Ismay was also a proponent of NATO expansion, saying that NATO "must grow until the whole free world gets under one umbrella." However, before the Warsaw Pact was even put in place, he opposed the request to join NATO made by the USSR in 1954 saying that "the Soviet request to join NATO is like an unrepentant burglar requesting to join the police force" thus making apparent that NATO alliance ("the police force") was directed against the USSR. As stated in the official NATO website "the request tested the limits of NATO's willingness to admit new members".

As secretary general, Ismay also worked to encourage closer political co-ordination among the members of the alliance. During the Suez Crisis he offered his good offices to help resolve issues among members of the alliance. Ismay also offered to help mediate disputes over Cyprus.

In December 1956, Ismay decided to retire from NATO. He told the press that "he was not giving up his position for personal reasons, but because he felt it needed a fresh hand and a fresh brain." Paul-Henri Spaak was immediately chosen as his successor, but Ismay remained in office until May 1957, when he left with "the affection and respect" of all the NATO members. While Secretary General, Ismay is also credited as having been the first person to say that the purpose of NATO was "to keep the Soviet Union out, the Americans in, and the Germans down," a saying that has since become a common way to quickly describe the alliance.

== Retirement and death ==
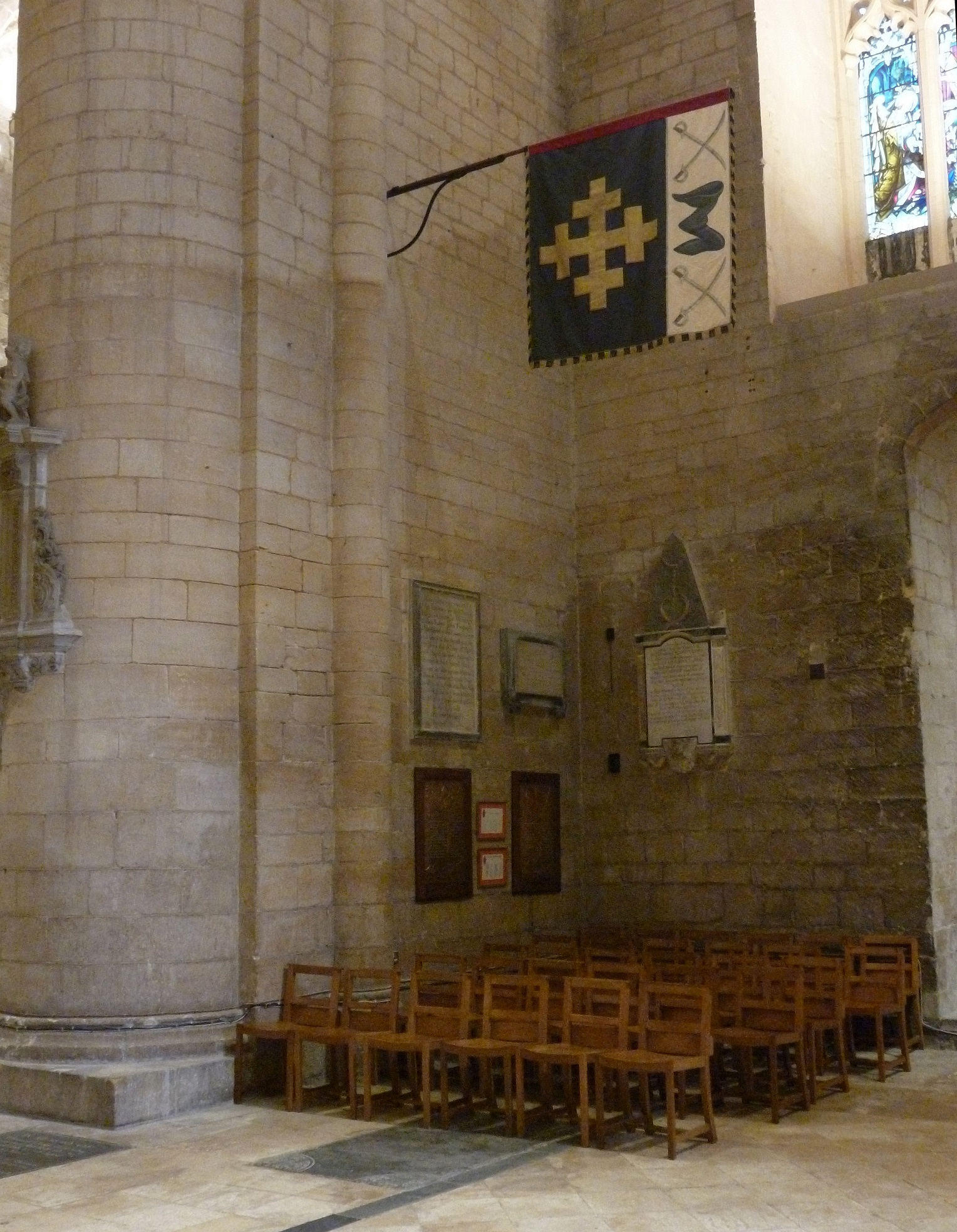
Garter banner of the late Lord Ismay in Tewkesbury Abbey

Immediately after leaving NATO, Ismay was appointed to the Order of the Garter by Queen Elizabeth II.

He joined the boards of several corporations including the Ashanti Goldfields Corporation. Ismay also began writing his memoirs, The Memoirs of General the Lord Ismay, which were published in 1960 by Viking Press. In his memoirs, Ismay focussed principally on his Second World War service, and as such, one reviewer called them "a most significant addition to the literature of the Second World War."

In 1963, Ismay was again asked to assist in a review of the organisation of the British military along with Sir Ian Jacob. Although Ismay was ill throughout most of the review and did relatively little of the work, "his influence was strong", and the final product of the review largely reflected his opinions. In the end, the Ismay–Jacob Report recommended strengthening the central power of the Ministry of Defence substantially, and in 1964, Parliament implemented its recommendations.

Ismay died on 17 December 1965 at his home Wormington Grange, Gloucestershire, at the age of 78. As he had no male heir, his title became extinct.

== In popular culture ==
- Portrayed by Paul Hardwick in the 1979 BBC television drama Churchill and the Generals
- By Nigel Davenport in 1986 ITV series Lord Mountbatten: The Last Viceroy
- By Richard Lumsden in the 2017 film Darkest Hour
- By Michael Gambon in the 2017 film Viceroy's House

== Arms ==
Coat of arms of Hastings Ismay, 1st Baron Ismay, KG, GCB, CH, DSO, PC, DL
Coronet A Baron's Coronet Crest Two Cavalry Swords in saltire proper in front of a Crescent between two Annulets Gules. Escutcheon Azure a Cross Crosslet Or on a Chief Argent a Maunch Sable between two pairs of Cavalry Swords in saltire proper. Supporters Dexter: A Private of the Somaliland Cavalry Corps; Sinister: A Sowar of the Indian Cavalry, both in field service dress proper Motto Have No Fear

== General references ==
=== Books ===
- Beachey, Ray (1990). The Warrior Mullah. London: Bellew Publishing. ISBN 0-947792-43-0. OCLC 60081063.
- Churchill, Winston (1948). The Gathering Storm. The Second World War. Vol. 2. Boston: Houghton Mifflin Company. OCLC 3025315.
- Colville, John (1981). Winston Churchill and His Inner Circle. New York: Wyndham Books. ISBN 0-671-42583-8. OCLC 7283766.
- Conekin, Becky (2003). The Autobiography of a Nation: The 1951 Festival of Britain. Manchester: Manchester University Press. ISBN 0-7190-6060-5. OCLC 50783359.
- Collins, Larry; LaPierre, Dominique (1975). Freedom at Midnight. New York: Simon & Schuster. ISBN 0-671-22088-8. OCLC 1366307.
- Eisenhower, Dwight (1949). Crusade in Europe (3rd ed.). London: William Heinemann. OCLC 394251.
- Eisenhower, John (1982). Allies: Pearl Harbor to D-Day. Garden City, New York: Doubleday. ISBN 0-385-11479-6. OCLC 7672682.
- Gilbert, Martin (1991). Churchill: A Life. New York: Henry Holt and Company. ISBN 0-8050-0615-X. OCLC 24011440.
- Ismay, Hastings (1954). NATO: The First Five Years. NATO. Archived from the original on 15 March 2017.
- Ismay, Hastings (1960). The Memoirs of General Lord Ismay. New York: Viking Press. OCLC 793535804.
- Johnson, Franklyn (1980). Defence by Ministry. New York: Holmes & Meier Publisher, Inc. ISBN 0-8419-0598-3. OCLC 5889060.
- Jordan, Robert (1967). The NATO International Staff/Secretariat 1952–1957. London: Oxford University Press. OCLC 59029584.
- Lamb, Richard (1991). Churchill as War Leader. New York: Caroll & Graff Publishers, Inc. ISBN 0-88184-937-5. OCLC 27340277.
- Leahy, William (1950). I Was There. New York: Whittlesey House. OCLC 397109.
- Lewin, Ronald (2004). "Hastings Lionel Ismay". In Matthew, H.C.G; Harrison, Brian (eds.). Oxford Dictionary of National Biography. Vol. 29. Oxford: Oxford University Press. ISBN 0-19-861379-2. OCLC 226159003.
- Naylor, John (1984). A man and an institution. Cambridge: Cambridge University Press. ISBN 0-521-25583-X.
- Overy, Richard (1989). The Road to War. London: Macmillan.
- Oxbury, Harold (1985). Great Britons. Oxford: Oxford University Press. ISBN 0-19-211599-5. OCLC 11533077.
- Roskill, Stephen (1972). Hankey: Man of Secrets. Vol. 1–3. London: Collins. ISBN 0-00-211330-9. OCLC 226236422.
- Sangster, Andrew (2023). Pug Churchill's Chief of Staff: The Life of General Hastings Ismay KG GCB CH DSO PS, 1887 1965. Pen and Sword Books. ISBN 978-1399045773.
- Sainsbury, Keith (1985). The Turning Point. Oxford: Oxford University Press. ISBN 0-19-215858-9. OCLC 10823797.
- US Department of State Historical Office (1968) [1958]. Aandahl, Fredrick; Franklin, William M.; Slany, William (eds.). Foreign Relations of the United States: Conferences at Washington, 1941–1942, and Casablanca, 1943. Washington, DC: Government Printing Office. OCLC 1444030.
- Wingate, Ronald (1970). Lord Ismay: A Biography. London: Hutchinson of London. ISBN 0-09-102370-X. OCLC 102756.

=== Articles ===
- "Atlantic Council Deputies". The Times. 20 March 1952. p. 3a.
- "British Officers Decorated". The Times. 17 January 1946. p. 7c.
- "Cabinet Staff Change". The Times. 17 December 1946. p. 4g.
- Daniel, Clifton (13 March 1952). "Ismay Named Civilian Chief of Atlantic Pact Organization". The New York Times. p. 1.
- "Commodity Markets". The Times. 22 May 1957. p. 16g.
- "Court Circular". The Times. 16 May 1957. p. 14b.
- "Discussions in Ottawa". The Times. 15 January 1952. p. 4a.
- Evans, Michael (4 September 2006). "Army writer came close to exposing secrets of D-Day". The Times. London. Archived from the original on 19 March 2007.
- "First Chief of NATO, Lord Ismay, 78, Dies". The Washington Post. 19 December 1965.
- "General Ismay Promoted". The Times. 7 November 1942. p. 4e.
- "House of Lords". The Times. 6 February 1947. p. 8a.
- "Ismay to Study Service Unity". The Washington Post. 13 January 1964.
- Joffe, Josef (19 March 2009). "NATO: Soldiering On". Time. Archived from the original on 23 March 2009.
- Leventhal, Fred M. (Autumn 1995). "A Tonic to the Nation: The Festival of Britain, 1951". Albion. 27 (3): 445–453. doi:10.2307/4051737. JSTOR 4051737.
- "Lord Ismay Appointed". The Times. 11 March 1948. p. 4c.
- "Lord Ismay, Ex-Churchill Aide, Leader in NATO, Is Dead at 78". The New York Times. 18 December 1965.
- "M Spaak to Succeed Lord Ismay". The Times. 15 December 1956. p. 6a.
- MI5. "4 September 2006 releases: Other subjects of Security Service enquiries". Archived from the original on 13 February 2009.
- "Mr. Eden Sees Marshal Stalin". The Times. 28 October 1943. p. 4c.
- "N.A.T.O. Secretary General". The Times. 13 March 1952. p. 4e.
- "New Viceroy in Delhi". The Times. 23 March 1947. p. 6e.
- "New Years Honours List". The Times. 1 January 1947. p. 4f.
- "News in Brief". The Times. 26 July 1946. p. 3a.
- "Obituary: Lord Ismay". The Times. 18 December 1965. p. 9a.
- O'Dea, Patrick V. (April 1962). "At the Summit". The Review of Politics. 24 (2). University of Notre Dame: 299–300. doi:10.1017/S0034670500009748.
- "Prime Minister in the United States". The Times. 19 June 1942. p. 4a.
- "Resignation Honours". The Times. 14 August 1945. p. 4g.
- "Secretary Ismay". The Washington Post. 15 March 1952.
- Schorr, Daniel (1 April 2009). "With No Clear Mission, NATO Has Little Power". NPR.
- "Scope of 1951 Festival". The Times. 9 June 1949. p. 3a.
- "Sir H. Ismay Promoted". The Times. 20 May 1944. p. 7g.
- "Sir M. Hankey's Successors". The Times. 2 June 1938. p. 14c.
- "The Birthday Honours". The Times. 13 June 1946. p. 8a.

Military offices
Preceded by C. W. G. Walker	Assistant Secretary to the Committee of Imperial Defence; 1925–1930	Succeeded by G. N. Macready
Preceded by C. O. Harvey	Military Secretary to the Viceroy of India; 1931–1933	Succeeded by A. H. H. Muir
Preceded by H. R. Pownall	Deputy Secretary to the Committee of Imperial Defence; 1936–1938	Unknown
Preceded by Sir Maurice Hankey	Secretary to the Committee of Imperial Defence; 1938–1939	None; Responsibilities transferred to the War Cabinet
Political offices
Preceded by Patrick Gordon Walker	Secretary of State for Commonwealth Relations; 1951–1952	Succeeded by The Marquess of Salisbury
Diplomatic posts
New title	Secretary General of NATO; 1952–1957	Succeeded by Paul-Henri Spaak
Peerage of the United Kingdom
New creation	Baron Ismay; 1947–1965	Extinct
