= Odda's Dedication Stone =

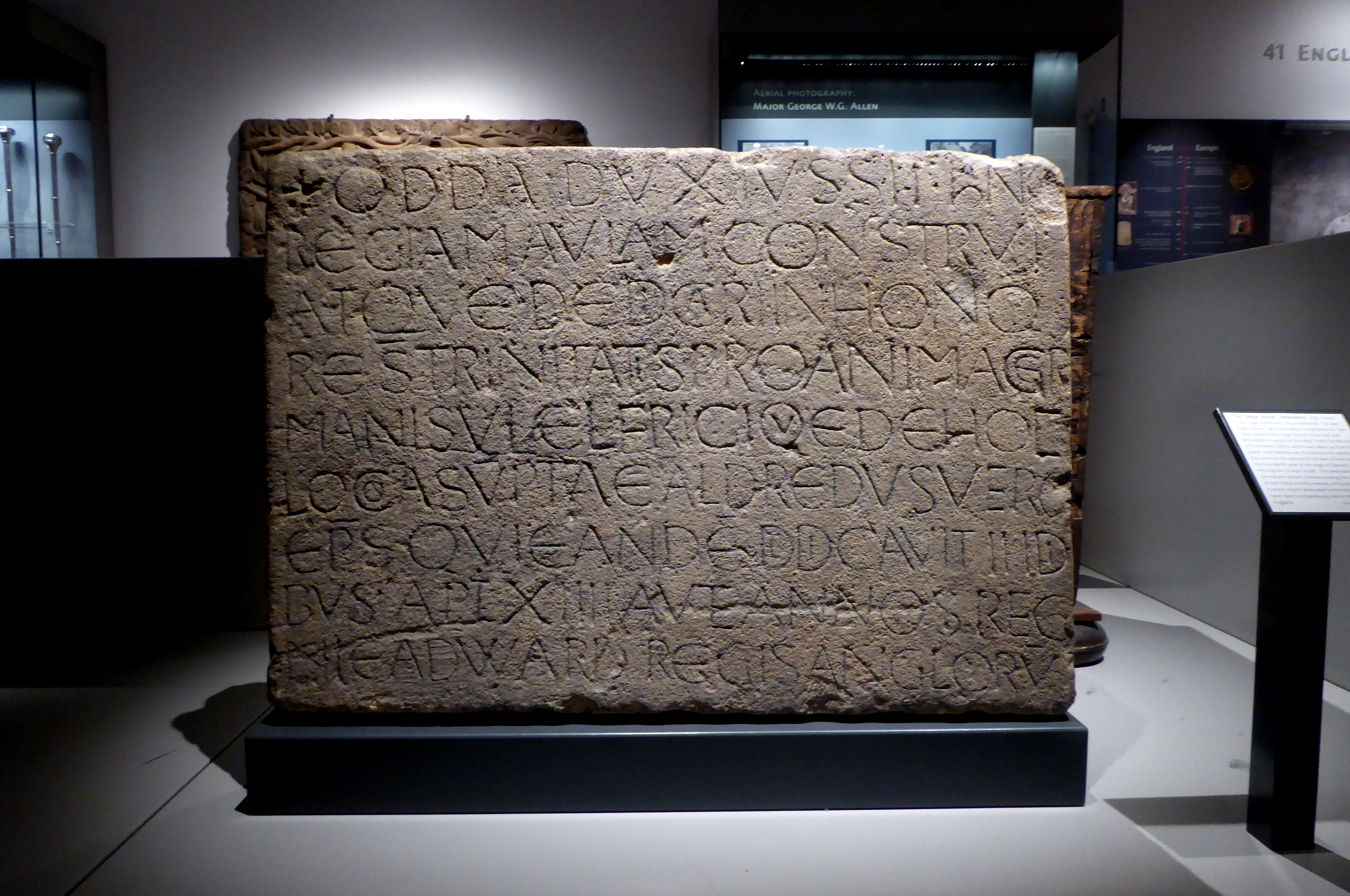
The Stone on display

Odda's Dedication Stone is an Anglo-Saxon object in the Ashmolean Museum in Oxford, England. It bears an inscription regarding the dedication of a chapel at Deerhurst, Gloucestershire. The building, known as Odda's Chapel, still exists.

== History ==
The limestone slab bears an 11th-century inscription in Latin relating to the dedication of a chapel built by Earl Odda.

There is evidence that the stone remained fixed to the chapel for centuries, but it became detached. In 1675 Sir John Powell discovered the stone on his property at Deerhurst. He gave it to the University of Oxford.

== Inscription ==
The Latin text is available at the Ashmolean Latin Inscriptions Project. The inscription translates as follows:

"Earl Odda ordered this royal hall to be built and dedicated in honour of the Holy Trinity for the soul of his brother Ælfric, taken up from this place. Ealdred was the bishop who dedicated the building on the second day before Ides of April in the fourteenth year of the reign of Edward, king of the English".

== Access ==
"Odda's Stone" is on display in the Ashmolean Museum. A replica has been placed in Odda's Chapel, the building to which the inscription refers.
