= Apperley =

Village in Gloucestershire, England

Coordinates: 51°57′N 2°12′W

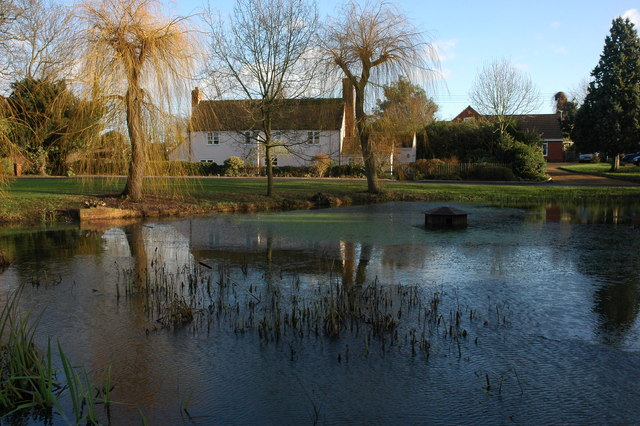
- Apperley village pond

- Location within Gloucestershire
- Area: 0.2825 km^{2} (0.1091 sq mi)
- Population: 625 (2020 estimate)
  - Density: 2,212/km^{2} (5,730/sq mi)
- OS grid reference: SO862283
- Civil parish: Deerhurst
- District: Tewkesbury
- Shire county: Gloucestershire
- Region: South West
- Country: England
- Sovereign state: United Kingdom
- Post town: Gloucester
- Postcode district: GL19
- Dialling code: 01452
- Police: Gloucestershire
- Fire: Gloucestershire
- Ambulance: South Western
- UK Parliament: Tewkesbury
- Website: Apperley and Deerhurst

Apperley is a village in Gloucestershire, England, about 3 miles (5 km) southwest of Tewkesbury, 1 mile (1.6 km) south of Deerhurst and 1/3 mile (0.5 km) east of the River Severn. It is the largest settlement in Deerhurst civil parish. In 2020 it had an estimated population of 625.

The place-name is derived from the Old English Apuldor-lēah, meaning "apple-tree wood". The area still had orchards in the 1960s, but by then they were being removed.

== Manor ==
Wightfield manor existed by the reign of Edward the Confessor (AD 1042–66), when it was valued at one hide. But the earliest known record of a settlement at Apperley itself dates from AD 1212, when it was part of Westminster Abbey's Deerhurst manor and was valued at three knight's fees.

Westminster Abbey held Wightfield manor by 1284, and possibly earlier. In the 14th century Gilbert Despenser, a son of Hugh Despenser the Younger and Isabella de Beauchamp, bought Wightfield. The bear and ragged staff symbol of the Beauchamp family forms a gable finial on Apperley Hall at Lower Apperley. The house is late 16th- or early 17th-century, but the finial may have been salvaged from an earlier house.

In 1357 Gilbert Despenser sold Wightfield to John of Leigh. In 1382 Thomas of Leigh sold Wightfield to John Cassey, whose descendants held the manor until the 17th century. The Cassey family were recusants and royalists, so between 1647 and 1654 the Commonwealth of England sequestered their property.

Between 1660 and 1676 John Cassey sold Wightfield to a prominent recusant, Peter Fermor of Tusmore, Oxfordshire. In 1720 Fermor's son-in-law John More sold Wightfield to a John Snell of Gloucester. It passed to Snell's descendants in the Powell and Barnard families until it was sold in 1881.

=== Manor house ===
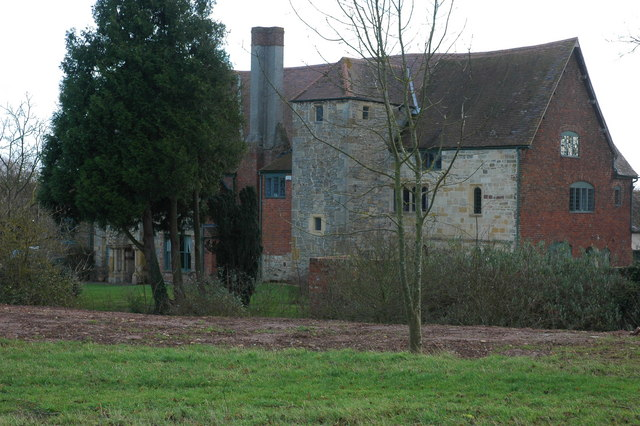
Wightfield Manor house

Wightfield Manor house is 1/2 mile (800 m) east of Apperley. Remnants of Anglo-Saxon wall, and 12th-century masonry including a Norman arch, have been found here. The Cassey family had a house here by 1385.

The current Wightfield Manor house is a Tudor building whose earliest parts are 16th-century. Much of the house is built of stone, probably taken in 1547 from a chapel at the Benedictine Deerhurst Priory, which was dissolved in 1540. The house is partly surrounded by a moat, and there is a second moated enclosure just east of the house.

The house has red-brick additions from the 17th century and later. It is a Grade II* listed building.

== Chapels and church ==
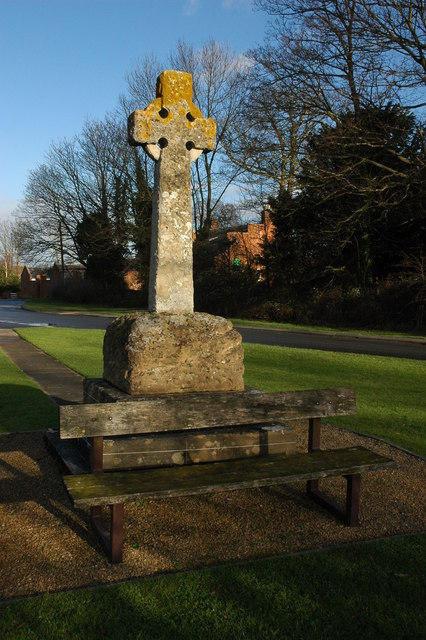
Apperley war memorial

For most of its history Apperley has been the largest settlement in Deerhurst parish, but the only parish church was St Mary's Priory Church, Deerhurst.

In the 18th century a Moravian congregation was established in Apperley, and in 1750 a red-brick chapel was built for it in School Road.

By 1792 the Moravian congregation had ceased to use the chapel, but by 1799 another congregation, possibly Methodist, was worshipping there. A Wesleyan Methodist congregation had formed in Apperley in the 18th century, and bought the former Moravian chapel in 1845 or 1846.

In 1856 the Church of England finally had a church built in Apperley. Holy Trinity parish church is a Romanesque Revival building in red brick designed by Francis Penrose. In 1890 Penrose added a west tower incorporating a porch, and an eastern apse for the chancel.

In 1904 the Wesleyan Methodists had a larger chapel built next to the old one in School Road. It is a Gothic Revival building in red brick. The Wesleyans turned the old Moravian chapel into a school room. It is now a store house.

== School ==
Apperley has a Church of England primary school. A National School was built in Apperley in 1858. In 1923 it was closed and its pupils were transferred to Deerhurst. But the old school building at Deerhurst has since been closed and the school moved to Apperley.

== Cricket club ==
Apperley has a cricket club that reached the final of the National Village Cricket Championship in 1998. The England cricketer Alfred Dipper (1885–1945) was born in Apperley.
