= Alf Dipper =

English cricketer (1885–1945)

Personal information
- Full name: Alfred Ernest Dipper
- Born: 9 November 1885; Apperley, Gloucestershire
- Died: 7 November 1945 (aged 59); Lambeth, London
- Batting: Right-handed
- Bowling: Right-arm medium
- Role: Batsman

International information
- National side: England
- Only Test (cap 195): 11 June 1921 v Australia

Domestic team information
- Years: Team
- 1908–1932: Gloucestershire
- 1926: Players

Career statistics
| Competition | Test | First-class |
|---|---|---|
| Matches | 1 | 481 |
| Runs scored | 51 | 28,075 |
| Batting average | 25.50 | 35.27 |
| 100s/50s | 0/0 | 53/147 |
| Top score | 40 | 252* |
| Balls bowled | – | 8,894 |
| Wickets | – | 161 |
| Bowling average | – | 30.45 |
| 5 wickets in innings | – | 5 |
| 10 wickets in match | – | 1 |
| Best bowling | – | 7/46 |
| Catches/stumpings | 0/– | 210/– |
- Source: CricketArchive, 7 October 2022

Alfred Ernest Dipper (9 November 1885 – 7 November 1945) was an English professional cricketer who played for Gloucestershire County Cricket Club from 1908 to 1932, and in one Test match for England in 1921. He was born at Apperley, Gloucestershire, and died at Lambeth, London.

Dipper was a right-handed opening batsman who played in 481 first-class matches. He scored 28,075 career runs at an average of 35.27 runs per completed innings with a highest score of 252* as one of 53 centuries. Dipper was an occasional right arm medium pace bowler and took 161 first-class wickets with a best return of 7/46. He took five wickets in an innings five times and ten wickets in a match once. His best match return was 14/104. He was generally perceived to be a weak fielder due to lack of mobility, but he held 210 career catches.

== Career ==
Alf Dipper, then aged 22, had been playing for his local club in Tewkesbury and made his first-class debut on 15 June 1908 after he was called into the Gloucestershire team at short notice because they were a man short going to the Angel Ground in Tonbridge for a County Championship match against Kent. He batted at number nine and top scored with 30* in the first innings but Gloucestershire collapsed twice to lose by an innings and 126 runs. Dipper was out for 8 in the second innings. He bowled 12 overs in the Kent innings and took 1/12 with the wicket of Ted Dillon, who was caught behind by Jack Board for 25. Dipper stayed with Gloucestershire but did not play regularly until he became their opening batsman in 1911. He scored 1,101 runs in 1911 with two centuries to establish his position in the team.

Dipper was essentially a defensive batsman. He exceeded 1,000 runs in a season 15 times and reached 2,000 in five of them. He played in just one Test match for England, against Australia at Lord's in 1921, a year when many new players were tried against the all-conquering team led by Warwick Armstrong. Dipper scored 40 and 11, but was dropped. His lack of mobility as a fielder probably cost him further consideration by the Test selectors.

== Later years ==
Having retired as a player, Dipper became a first-class umpire. He stood in 93 first-class matches from 1933 to 1936. In other sports, he was a high standard bowls player and good at billiards.

Dipper died at St Thomas' Hospital in Lambeth on 7 November 1945, two days before his 60th birthday. He was buried at Manor Park Cemetery in east London.
