= Odda of Deerhurst =

Anglo-Saxon nobleman

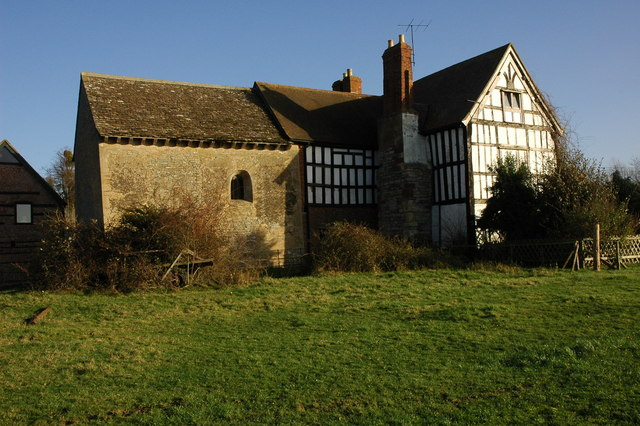
Earl Odda's chapel at Deerhurst in Gloucestershire

Odda of Deerhurst (before 993 – 31 August 1056) was an Anglo-Saxon nobleman active in the period from 1013 onwards. He became a leading magnate in 1051, following the exile of Godwin, Earl of Wessex and his sons and the confiscation of their property and earldoms, when King Edward the Confessor appointed Odda as earl over a portion of the vacated territory. Earl Godwin was later restored to royal favour, and his lands returned, while Odda received a new earldom in the west midlands in compensation. Odda became a monk late in life. He was buried at Pershore Abbey.

== Background ==
Odda perhaps first appears in the record as a charter witness in 1013 or 1014, late in the reign of King Æthelred the Unready, from which evidence it is presumed he was born no later than 993. His brother Ælfric, commemorated in the dedication of Odda's Chapel at Deerhurst, died on 22 December 1053. Their sister, named Ealdgyth, appears in Domesday Book. She may have outlived her brothers and perhaps was still living after the Norman Conquest.

William of Malmesbury describes Odda as a kinsman of King Edward the Confessor. The writings of 16th century antiquarian John Leland contain an annal, perhaps from Pershore Abbey, which gives Odda's father's name as "Elfer", that is Ælfhere. On chronological grounds, this is unlikely to be Ælfhere, Ealdorman of Mercia, who died in 983, although the Pershore chronicler may have believed that they were the same person. Williams proposes that Odda was a descendant, perhaps a grandson, of one of the siblings of the chronicler Ealdorman Æthelweard and Ælfgifu, wife of Edward's great-uncle King Eadwig.

== Life ==
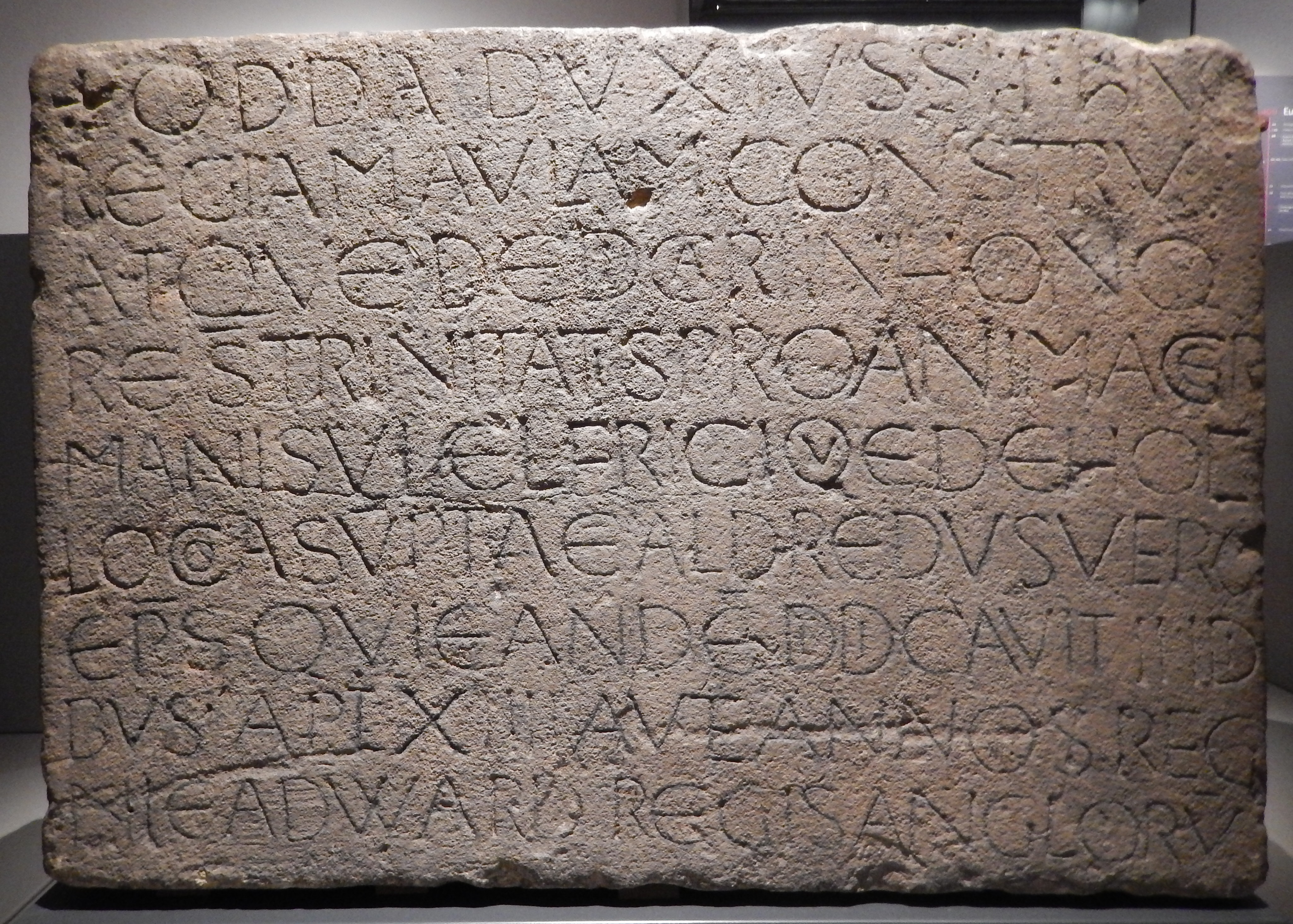
Odda's Dedication Stone now in the Ashmolean Museum, Oxford

While Odda appears to have witnessed charters during the reigns of Æthelred, Cnut, Harold Harefoot and Harthacnut, it was not until the reign of Edward the Confessor that he became a leading figure in the land. The evidence of Domesday Book suggests that during Edward's reign Odda held at least 167 hides of land, which placed him among the magnates and great landowners of England. He held half, some 60 hides, of estate of Deerhurst, lying mainly in Gloucestershire, and smaller estates in Devon, Herefordshire, Warwickshire and Worcestershire.

Odda was one of the major beneficiaries of the dispute between King Edward and Earl Godwin which led to Godwin's exile in 1051. He was appointed earl of Somerset, Dorset, Devon and Cornwall. Ralf of Mantes and Ælfgar were the others who gained greatly from the fall of Godwin and his sons.

Earls Odda and Ralf commanded the forces raised in 1052 to patrol against any attempt by the exiles to return. The fleet and army led by Odda and Ralf drove off an invasion led by Godwin in Sussex, but the king was eventually forced to revoke the exile and restore lands and earldoms to Godwin and his sons. Odda was thus deprived of his earldom in the west within months of receiving it, but he remained an earl, and was compensated with lands in Worcestershire and perhaps Gloucestershire.

Odda was responsible for the building of Odda's Chapel in Deerhurst as a chantry where masses would be said for the soul of his brother Ælfric, who died in 1053 and was buried at Pershore Abbey. Odda himself died at Deerhurst on 31 August 1056, having been ordained a monk by Bishop Aldred of Worcester, perhaps having taken the monastic name Æthelwine. He too was buried at Pershore.

The chronicler John of Worcester described Odda as "a lover of churches, restorer of the poor, defender of widows and orphans, helper of the oppressed, guardian of chastity".
