= Deerhurst =

Village in Gloucestershire, England

Coordinates: 51.96°N 2.19°W

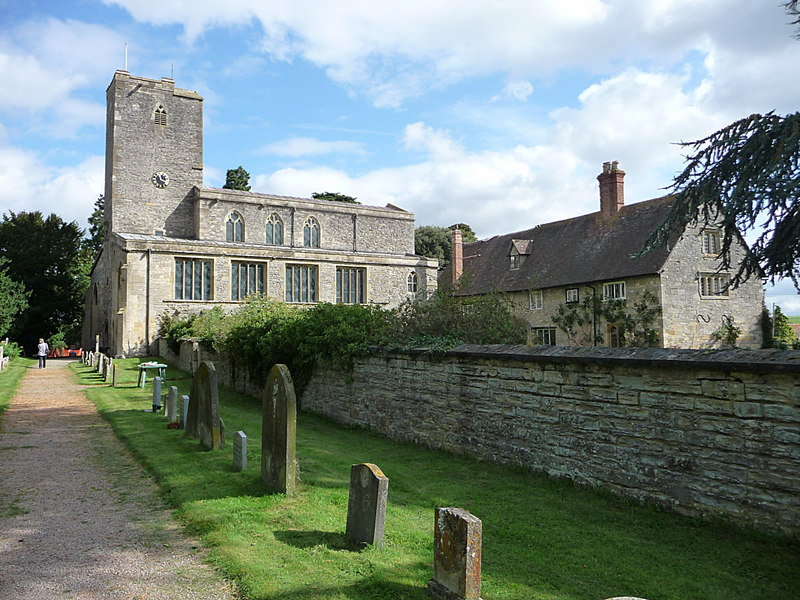
- St Mary's Church and Priory Farmhouse

- Location within Gloucestershire
- Population: 906 (2011 Census) (parish, including Apperley and Deerhurst Walton)
- OS grid reference: SO869295
- District: Tewkesbury
- Shire county: Gloucestershire
- Region: South West
- Country: England
- Sovereign state: United Kingdom
- Post town: Gloucester
- Postcode district: GL19
- Dialling code: 01452
- Police: Gloucestershire
- Fire: Gloucestershire
- Ambulance: South Western
- UK Parliament: Tewkesbury
- Website: Apperley and Deerhurst

Deerhurst is a village and civil parish in Gloucestershire, England, about 2 miles (3 km) southwest of Tewkesbury. The village is on the east bank of the River Severn. The parish includes the village of Apperley and the hamlet of Deerhurst Walton. The 2011 Census recorded the parish's population as 906, the majority of whom live in Apperley.

The place-name is derived from Old English and means "deer-wood". It was spelt Deorhyrst in AD 804, Dorhirst in about 1050 and Derherste in the Domesday Book in 1086.

== Geography ==
The parish has an area of about 3,137 acres (1,269 ha), bounded by the Severn to the west, the A38 road to the east and Coombe Hill Canal to the south.

The parish is low-lying and much of it is repeatedly flooded. After serious flooding in 1947 several cottages were abandoned and demolished. Deerhurst was inundated again by the floods of 2007.

== Priory and parish church ==
By AD 804 there was a Benedictine monastery at Deerhurst, which also held the manor. In about 1060 King Edward the Confessor divided the manor. He granted the monastery, with one hide of land, to the Abbey of St Denis in France, making it an alien priory. But the larger part of the land, assessed at five hides, he granted to Westminster Abbey.

Deerhurst Priory ceased to be an alien house in 1443 and the Crown granted it to Tewkesbury Abbey in 1467. Both the abbey and the priory were dissolved in 1540.

The priory church of St Mary, built in the 8th, 9th and 10th centuries AD, survives as Deerhurst's Church of England parish church. It has been described as "an Anglo-Saxon monument of the first order" and is a Grade I listed building.

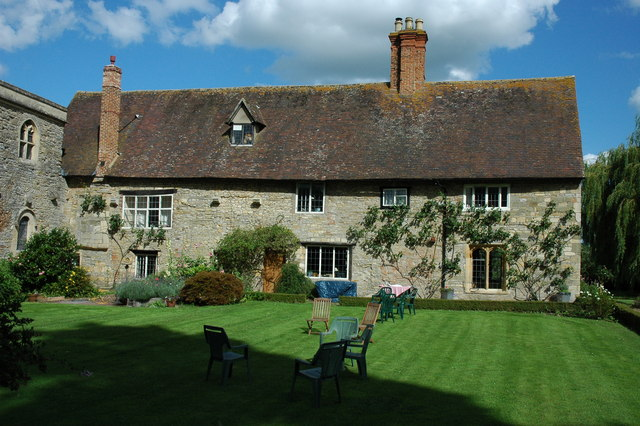
Priory Farmhouse

Part of another building of the priory survives in Priory Farmhouse, which adjoins the church. In its cellar is an 11th- or 12th-century column, but most of the core of the building seems to be 14th-century and later. After the dissolution in 1540 the building was converted into a farmhouse. It is a Grade I listed building.

== Odda's Chapel and Abbot's Court ==
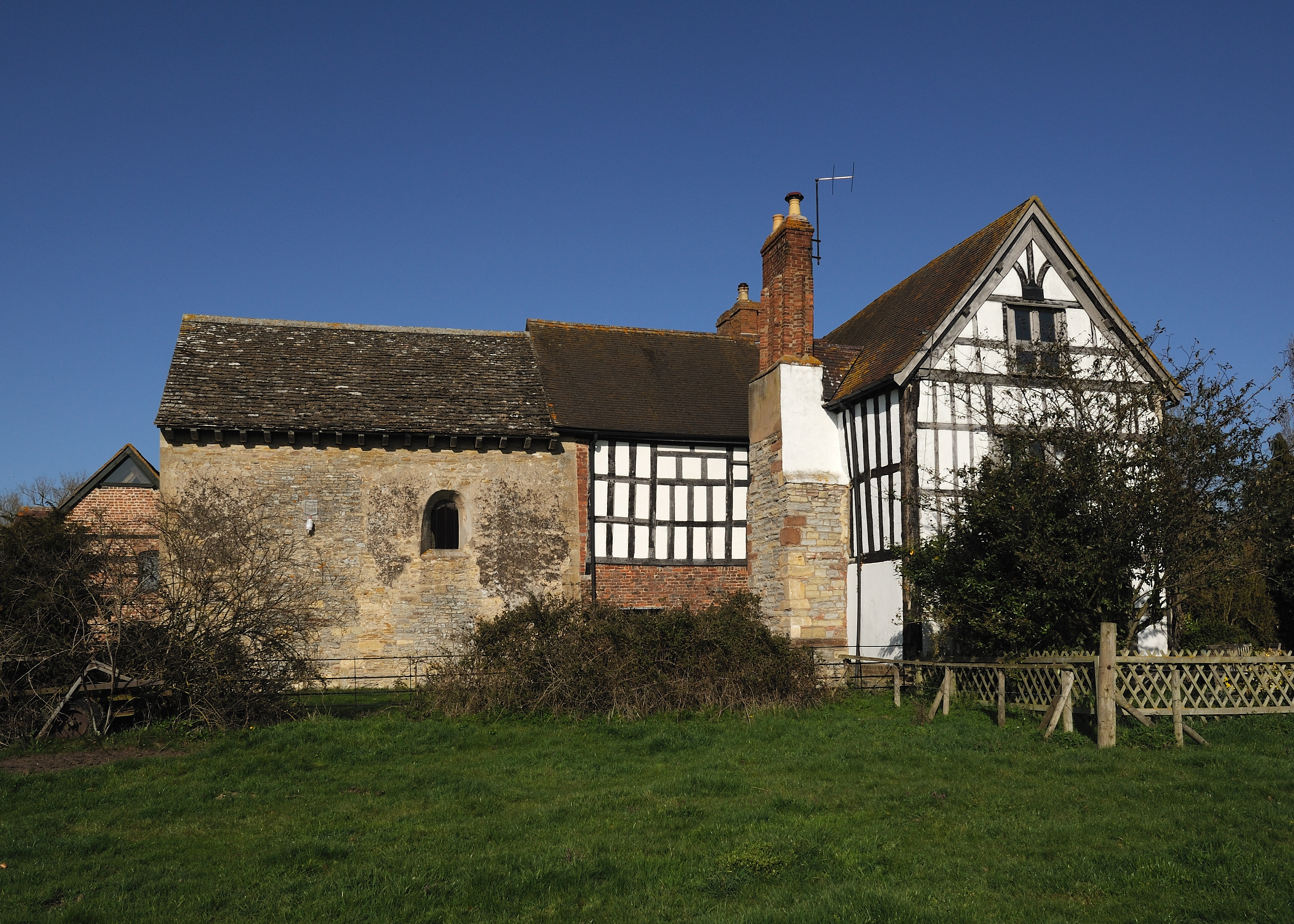
Odda's Chapel and Abbot's Court

Odda of Deerhurst founded Odda's Chapel in 1056 as a chantry for his brother Ælfric, who had died in 1053. Chantries were abolished in the 16th century and the chapel ceased to be used for worship.

Early in the 17th century a timber-framed house, Abbot's Court, was built next to it as the manor house for the Westminster Abbey's estate. The former chapel was converted into the service wing of the house. The chapel is a Grade I listed building.

== Deerhurst Manor ==
After dissolving the priory in 1540, the Crown leased its manor to a George Throckmorton. It remained with his heirs until 1604, when a Thomas Throckmorton sold it to Thomas Cassey of Wightfield Manor near Apperley.

In 1615 the Cassey sold the manor to Thomas Coventry, who in 1628 was created Baron Coventry. In 1697 the 5th Baron Coventry was created Earl of Coventry and at the subsidiary title "Viscount Deerhurst" was created for his heir apparent.

In 1964 trustees for the 11th Earl of Coventry still held an estate of 294 acres (119 ha) at Deerhurst. The Coventry family has never lived at Deerhurst: its seat is at Croome Court in Worcestershire.

== School ==
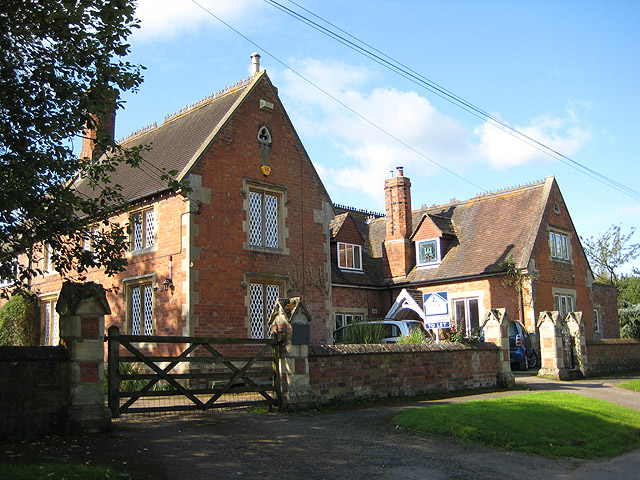
Former National School

A National School was built in Deerhurst in 1856. Apperley had its own school until 1923, when it was closed and its pupils were transferred to Deerhurst. By 1964 it was a primary school, and children over the age of 11 attended secondary schools in Tewkesbury. The school has since moved to Apperley, and the building in Deerhurst has been converted into two private houses.

== Legend ==
There is a local legend that a dragon once ravaged the area, until a man called John Smith killed it with an axe.

== Bibliography ==
- Ekwall, Eilert (1960). The Concise Oxford Dictionary of English Place Names. Oxford University Press. ISBN 978-0-19-869103-7.
- Elrington, CR, ed. (1968). "Deerhurst". A History of the County of Gloucester. Victoria County History. Vol. VIII. London: Oxford University Press for the Institute of Historical Research. pp. 34–49. ISBN 978-0197227244.
- Page, William, ed. (1907). "The Priory of Deerhurst". A History of the County of Gloucester. Victoria County History. Vol. II. Westminster: Archibald Constable & Co. pp. 103–105. ISBN 978-0712905558.
- Rahtz, Philip (2001). Deerhurst Above and Below Ground. Friends of Deerhurst Church. ISBN 0-9521199-5-1.
- Verey, David (1970). Gloucestershire: The Vale and the Forest of Dean. The Buildings of England. Vol. 2. Harmondsworth: Penguin Books. pp. 166–171.
