= Odda's Chapel =

Coordinates: 51.966879°N 2.1920845°W

- Chapel of the Holy Trinity
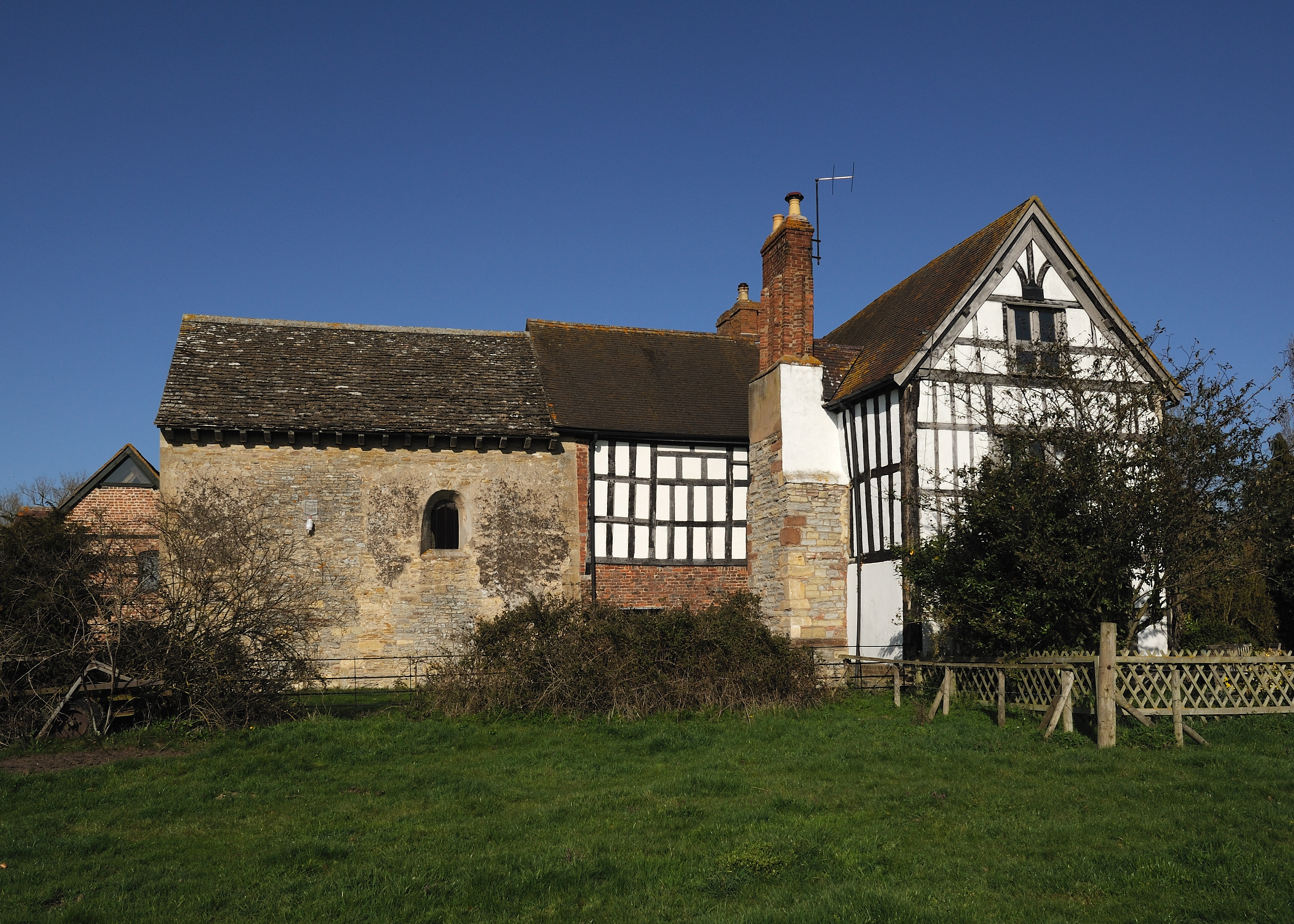
- Odda's Chapel (left) and Abbot's Court (right)

- Location within Gloucestershire
- Location: Deerhurst, Gloucestershire
- Country: England
- Denomination: Roman Catholic
- Website: Odda's Chapel

History
- Status: chantry
- Founder: Earl Odda
- Dedication: Holy Trinity
- Consecrated: 12 April 1056

Architecture
- Functional status: disused
- Heritage designation: Grade I listed
- Designated: 4 July 1960
- Style: Anglo-Saxon
- Years built: 11th century
- Completed: 1056

Specifications
- Materials: rubble masonry with squared quoins

Odda's Chapel is a former chantry chapel at Deerhurst, Gloucestershire. It is an 11th-century late Anglo-Saxon building, completed a decade before the Norman Conquest of England.

In the 16th century the chapel ceased to be used for worship and by the 17th century it was part of a farmhouse. It was rediscovered and restored late in the 19th century, and further restored in the 20th century. It is now managed by English Heritage.

The chapel is the smaller of two Anglo-Saxon places of worship in Deerhurst. The larger and older is St Mary's Priory Church. Both buildings were part of a Benedictine priory, whose site is now a scheduled monument.

== Architecture ==
The building has a nave and chancel, linked by a Romanesque chancel arch. A smaller Romanesque arch forms a doorway on the north side of the chapel. The nave has small windows high in the north and south walls.

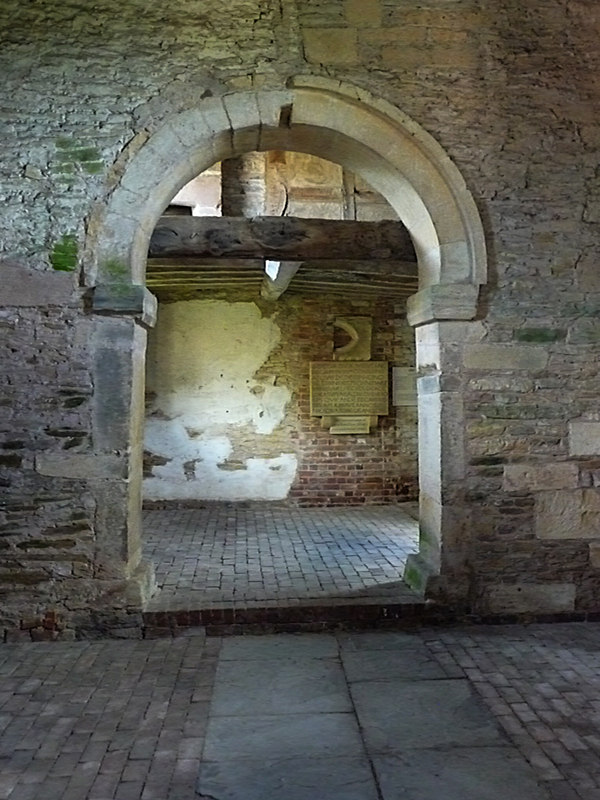
Chancel arch seen from the nave

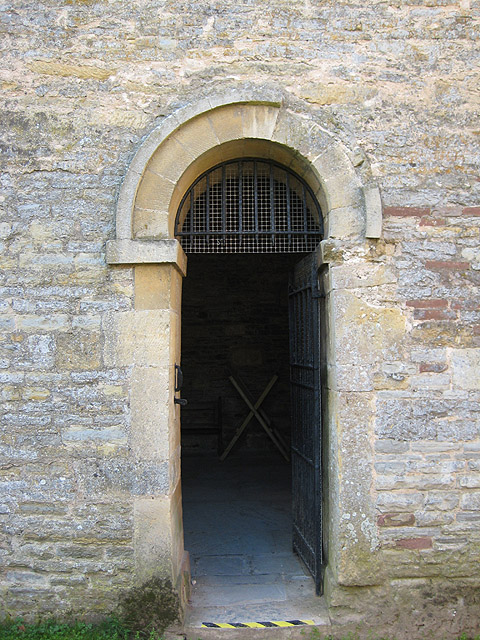
North doorway to the nave

== History ==
Earl Odda had the chapel built for the benefit of the soul of his brother Ælfric, who died on 22 December 1053. Ealdred, Bishop of Worcester consecrated it on 12 April 1056.

=== Secularisation ===
As a consequence of the English Reformation, it would have no longer been possible to use the building for its original purpose. In the 1540s Kings Henry VIII and Edward VI abolished chantries.

Late in the 16th or early in the 17th century the chapel building was re-used as part of a timber-framed farmhouse, Abbot's Court, which was built against its east wall. The nave was converted into a kitchen. A first floor was inserted in the chancel. Three- and four-light domestic windows were inserted in the north and south walls of the chancel. In time the building's true age and its identity as a chapel were forgotten.

=== Odda's Stone ===
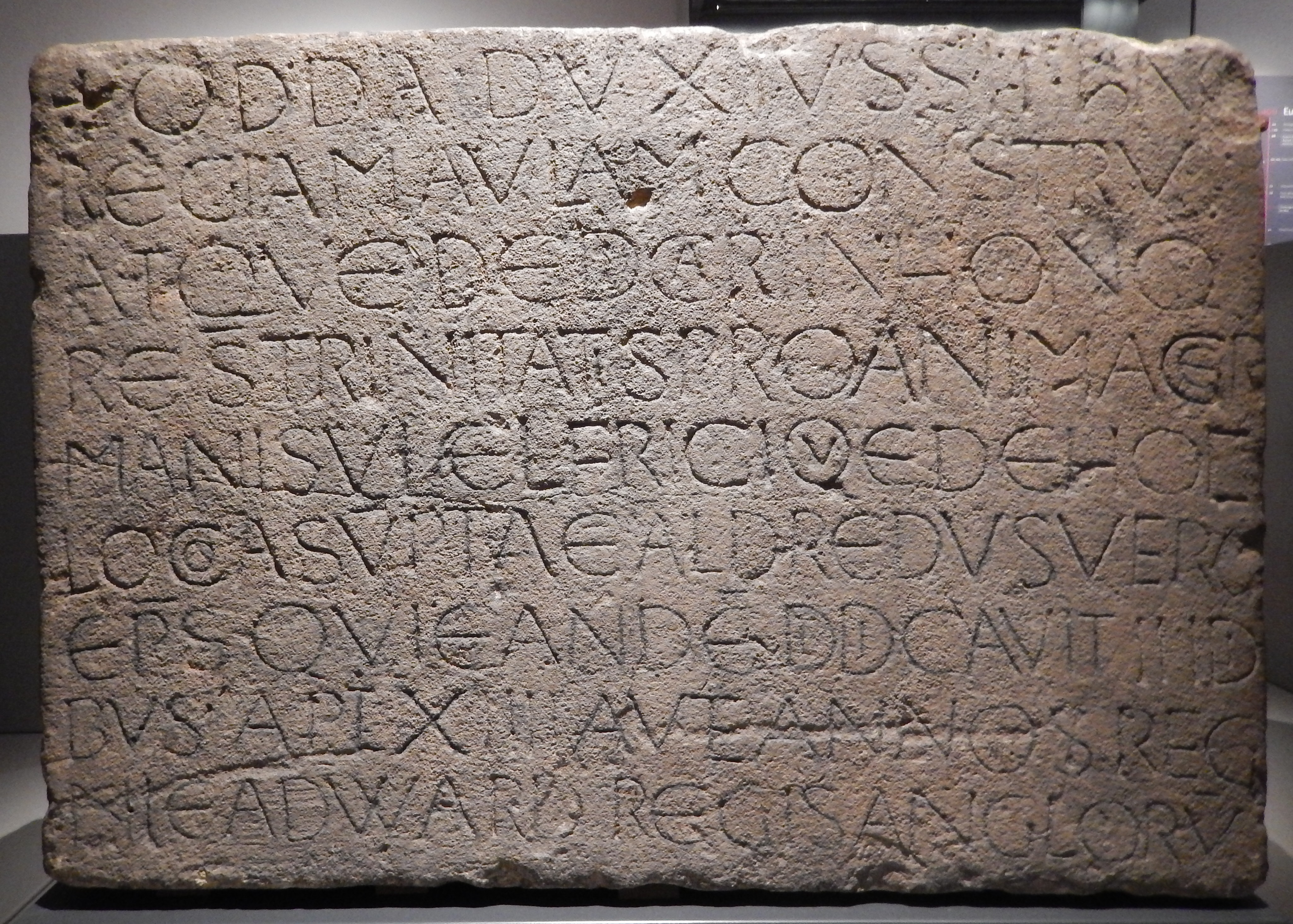
Dedication stone set up by Earl Odda, dated 1056, now in the Ashmolean Museum, Oxford

In 1675 Sir John Powell, a local landowner, discovered a stone slab near Deerhurst. Powell was a judge and would have been sufficiently educated to be able to decipher the slab's 11th-century Latin inscription concerning the dedication of the chapel. However, the chapel itself remained unidentified.

The inscription translates:

"Earl Odda ordered this royal hall to be built and dedicated in honour of the Holy Trinity for the soul of his brother Ælfric, taken up from this place. Ealdred was the bishop who dedicated the building on the second day before Ides of April in the fourteenth year of the reign of Edward, king of the English".

"Odda's Stone" is now in the Ashmolean Museum, Oxford, and a replica is in the chapel.

== Discovery and restoration ==
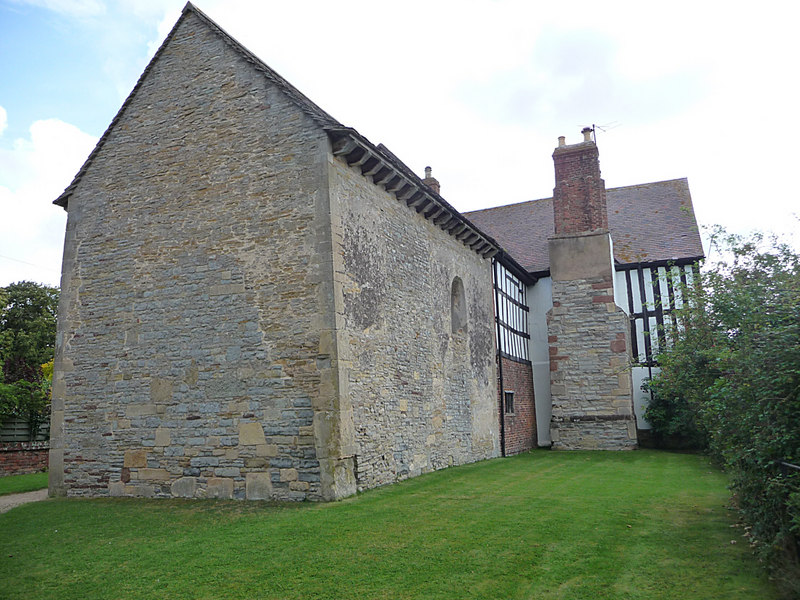
Odda's Chapel, with Abbot's Court attached, from the north-west, 2009

In 1865 the then Vicar of St Mary's parish church, Deerhurst, Rev. George Butterworth, deduced from a chronicle of Tewkesbury Abbey and from the existence of Odda's Stone that there had been a chantry chapel in Deerhurst. In 1885 during repairs to Abbot's Court a blocked Anglo-Saxon window was discovered hidden behind plaster.

In 1960 the Ministry of Works made the chapel a Grade I listed building. In 1965 the chapel was "disentangled" from Abbot's Court farmhouse and restoration was begun. Although the roof was largely 17th century it incorporated timbers of 11th-12th century date which may be part of the original roof. Nonetheless, this roof was destroyed in the 1965 restoration.

There have been a number of archaeological excavations at Deerhurst since the 1970s. Items from the 1981 excavation led by Philip Rahtz are in Tewkesbury Museum.

== Bibliography ==
- Verey, David (1970). Gloucestershire: The Vale and the Forest of Dean. The Buildings of England. Vol. 2. Harmondsworth: Penguin Books. p. 170.
