= Woodmancote =

Woodmancote may refer to more than one place in England:

== Gloucestershire ==
- Woodmancote, Dursley, a village
- Woodmancote, Cirencester, a village
- Woodmancote, Tewkesbury Borough, a village and civil parish

== West Sussex ==
- Woodmancote, Chichester District, a village
- Woodmancote, Horsham District, a village and civil parish
