= Toddington railway station =

Heritage railway station in England

Toddington
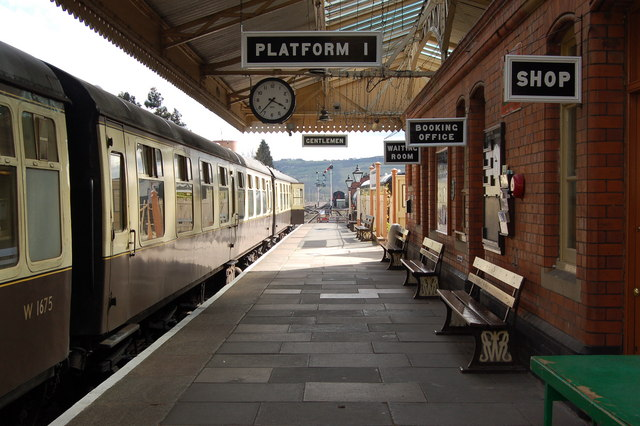
- Platform 1 in 2008.

General information
- Location: Toddington, Tewkesbury; England
- Coordinates: 51.98910°N 1.92813°W
- Grid reference: SP050323
- System: Station on heritage railway
- Operator: Gloucestershire Warwickshire Railway
- Platforms: 2

History
- Original company: Great Western Railway
- Post-grouping: Great Western Railway; Western Region of British Railways

Key dates
- 1 December 1904: Opened
- 7 March 1960: Closed to passengers
- 2 January 1967: Goods facilities withdrawn
- 22 April 1984: Reopened
Location

Toddington railway station serves the village of Toddington in Gloucestershire, England. Since 1984 it has been the main base of operations for the heritage Gloucestershire Warwickshire Railway.

The station is located on the Honeybourne Line which linked Cheltenham and Stratford-upon-Avon and which was opened by the Great Western Railway in 1906. The station was a centre of fruit and milk traffic, but receipts dwindled after a railwaymen's strike in 1955. The station closed to passengers in 1960, although the line itself remained open for freight and diversionary use until 1976; the track was lifted in 1979-80.

== History ==
On 9 July 1859, the Oxford, Worcester and Wolverhampton Railway opened a line from Stratford-upon-Avon to Honeybourne. The OW&W became the West Midland Railway in 1860 and was acquired by Great Western Railway in 1883 with a view to combining it with the Birmingham to Stratford Line to create a high-speed route from the Midlands to the South West. The GWR obtained authorisation in 1899 for the construction of a double-track line between Honeybourne and Cheltenham and this was completed in stages by 1908.

Toddington station was opened on 1 December 1904. It was built as a railhead for fruit traffic, with a fruit packing shed being provided in the goods yard in addition to the goods shed. The shed was 60 ft (18 m) long and comprised a 0 long tons 30 cwt 0 qr 0 lb (3,360 lb or 1.524 t) goods crane. The goods yard was the largest on the line and accommodated three main sidings which were each capable of holding 30 wagons. Two more sidings led into the fruit shed. The fruit was processed in a nearby trading estate established by T W Beach & Sons in 1883, where it was put into tins and shipped out again; coffee was also dealt with in a similar way.

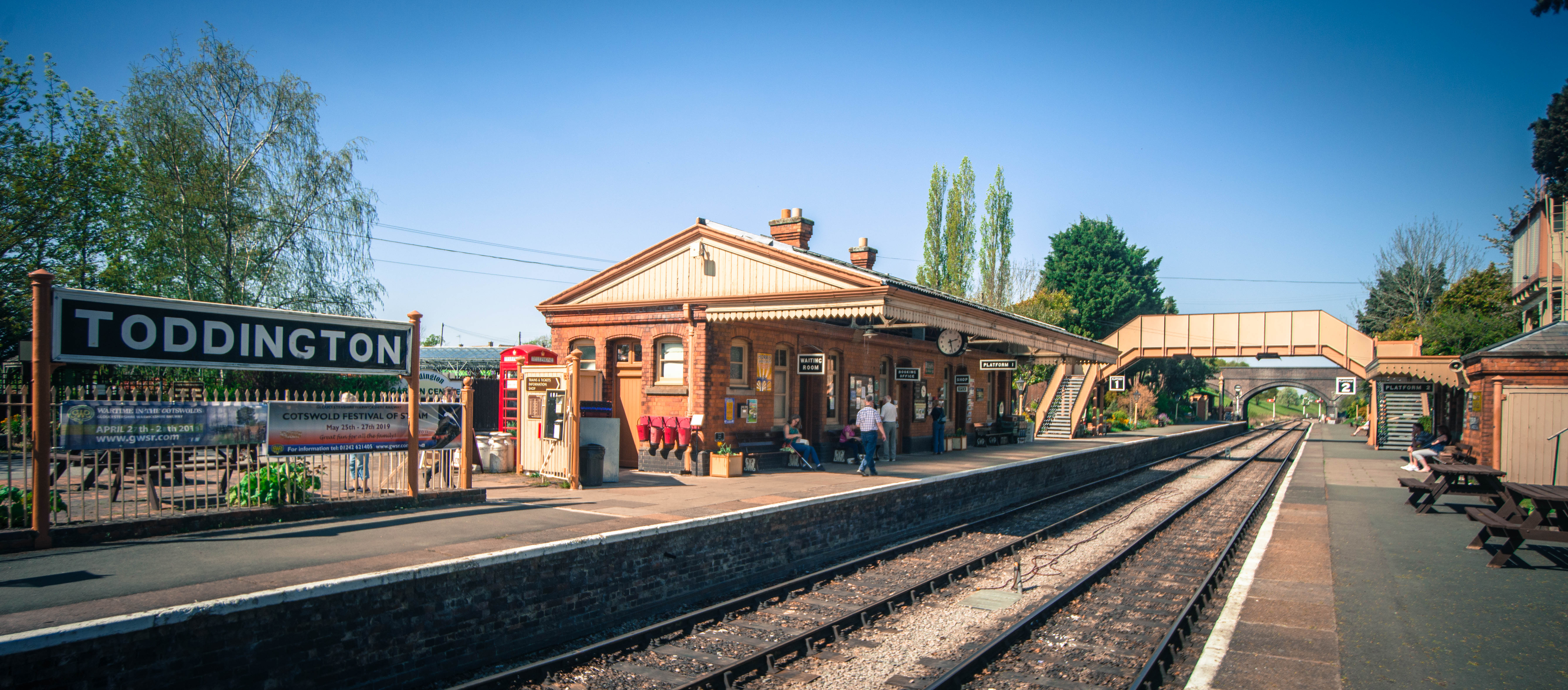
The main station building as viewed from Platform 2

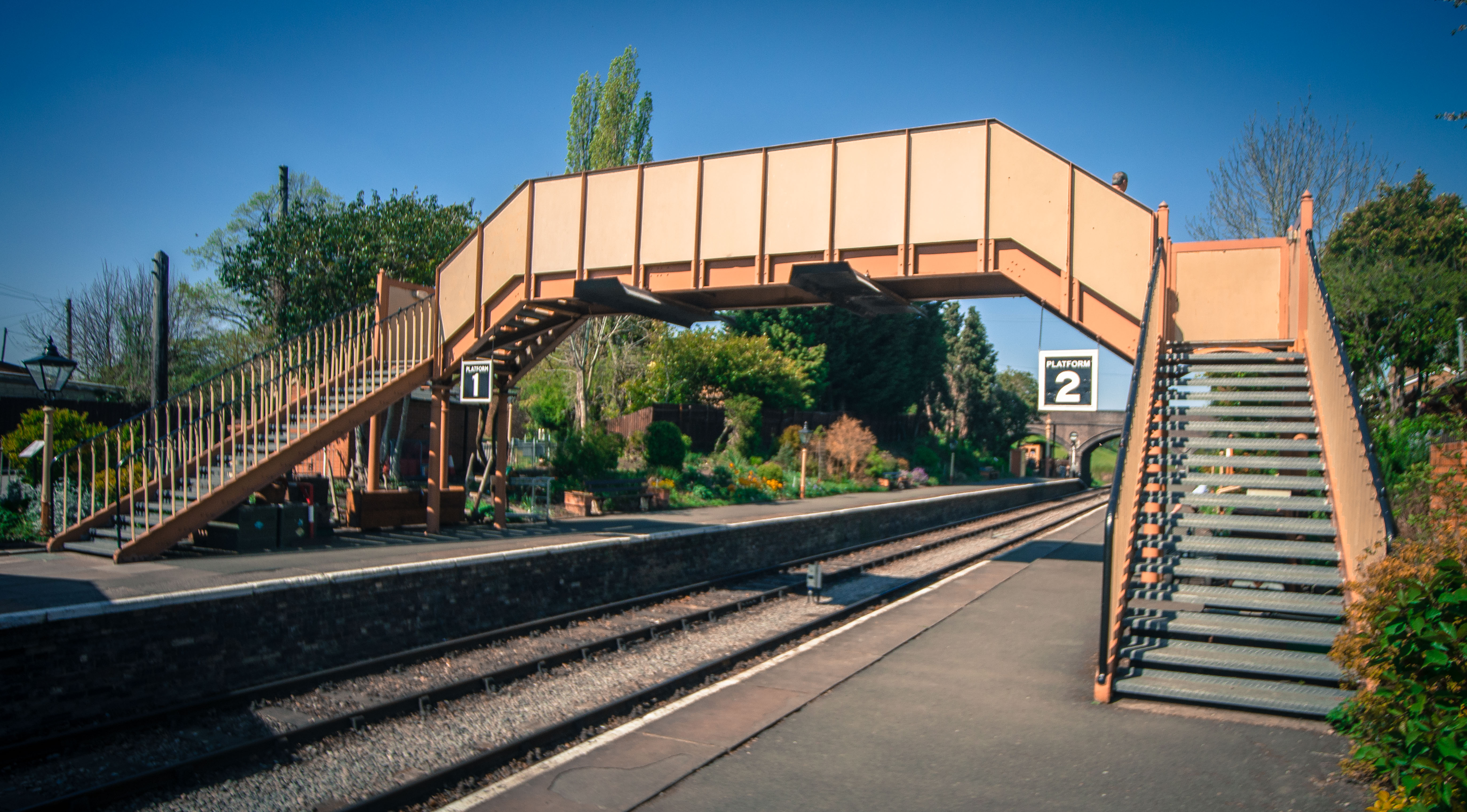
The station footbridge

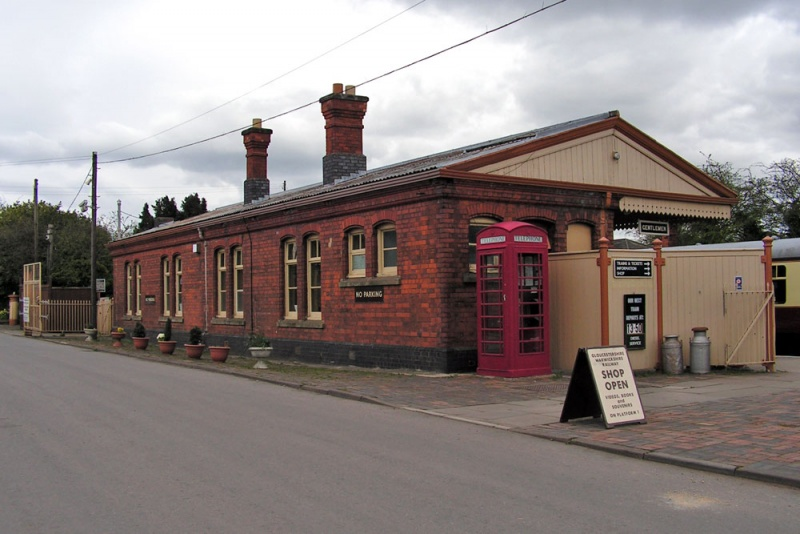
The main station building as viewed from the car park.

A temporary 29-lever signal box was brought into service to welcome the first train, the 06.43 from Honeybourne which arrived at 07.10. This was replaced in January 1905 at a cost of £236 (or £24,810 in 2025 (Note: UK Consumer Price Index inflation figures from 1209–2024 based on data from "Inflation calculator". Bank of England. London. 18 February 2026.)) for the extension of the line to Winchcombe. A footbridge was provided in 1912 to link the two 400 ft (120 m) platforms; the main station building stood on the up platform, behind which was a dock from which large quantities of milk were dispatched. Opposite the main building on the down platform was a small passenger waiting shelter and a large water tank which drew its supply from the Stanway Estate. The station was lit by acetylene gas lamps until 1917 when calcium carbide became difficult to obtain.

The first through passenger excursions to call at Toddington began in August 1906 following the opening of the line through to Cheltenham. Initially, they were a Mondays-only service from Swansea to Leamington Spa and Wolverhampton to Tintern, but became more regular following the opening of the North Warwickshire Line in July 1908. Nearby Stanway House, the residence of the Earl of Wemyss, attracted a number of visitors by rail, one of the most famous of whom being J. M. Barrie. Passenger tickets sold at Toddington fell from 11,580 in 1913 to 6,050 in 1933; during the same period goods forwarded and received dropped from 5414 tons to 1802 tons. Fruit traffic was badly affected by a 1954 strike by railwaymen, which turned fruit growers towards road transport.

Toddington closed to passenger traffic on 7 March 1960, leaving the goods yard in use until 2 September 1967 after which the weigh house and fruit packing shed were demolished. With the line remaining open to goods and diversionary traffic, the platforms were cut away by April 1968 to facilitate the out-of-gauge loads which used the route. Closure of the line along with the signal box at Toddington came on 22 October 1976 and the track was lifted in 1979-80.

=== Stationmasters ===
- Thomas Marsden 1904 - 1931 (formerly station master at Presthope)
- T.D. Lane 1931 - 1944
- Raymond Breeze 1944 - 1950
- Edgar Archibald Tredwell from 1956 (formerly station master at Blockley)

Preceding station	Heritage railways	Following station
Hayles Abbey Halt towards Cheltenham Race Course	Gloucestershire Warwickshire Railway	Broadway Terminus
Historical railways
Hayles Abbey Halt; Line open, station open	Great Western Railway; Honeybourne Line	Laverton Halt; Line open, station closed

== Present day ==
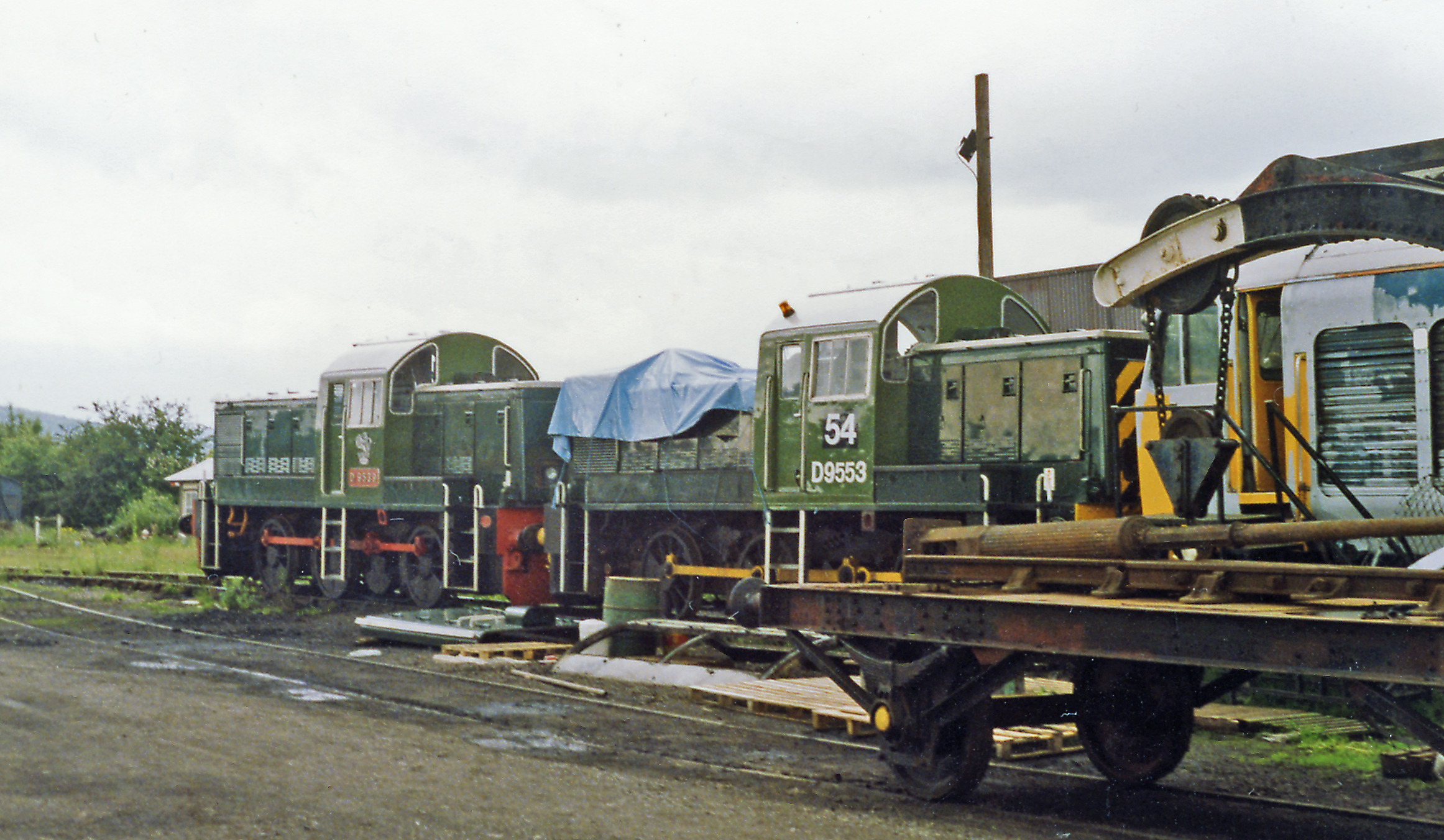
Two Class 14 Diesels at Toddington, Gloucestershire & Warwickshire Railway, 1993

The Gloucestershire Warwickshire Railway took a lease of Toddington yard from 24 March 1981, with the first working party on site on 28 March. After site clearance, the first track was laid and a compound was built alongside the goods shed which was used by a small business. The signal box was included in the compound, although its lever frame had been purchased and removed by the Gwili Railway a few days earlier just as the lease negotiations were being finalised.

Toddington's first locomotive, a Hudswell Clarke D615 0-6-0 diesel shunter, was delivered on 30 May 1981, to be followed by GWR 2800 Class 2807 from Woodham Brothers on 20 June 1981. During the next four years, the station site was transformed with the thorough refurbishment of the station building, reinstatement of the platform and restoration of the signal box with a new frame from Earlswood Lakes. Double track was laid through the station towards Stanway Viaduct to the north and extensive sidings were laid to accommodate a large collection of locomotives and rolling stock. The goods shed was taken over and converted into a workshop and office, whilst a water tower was brought in from Ashford.

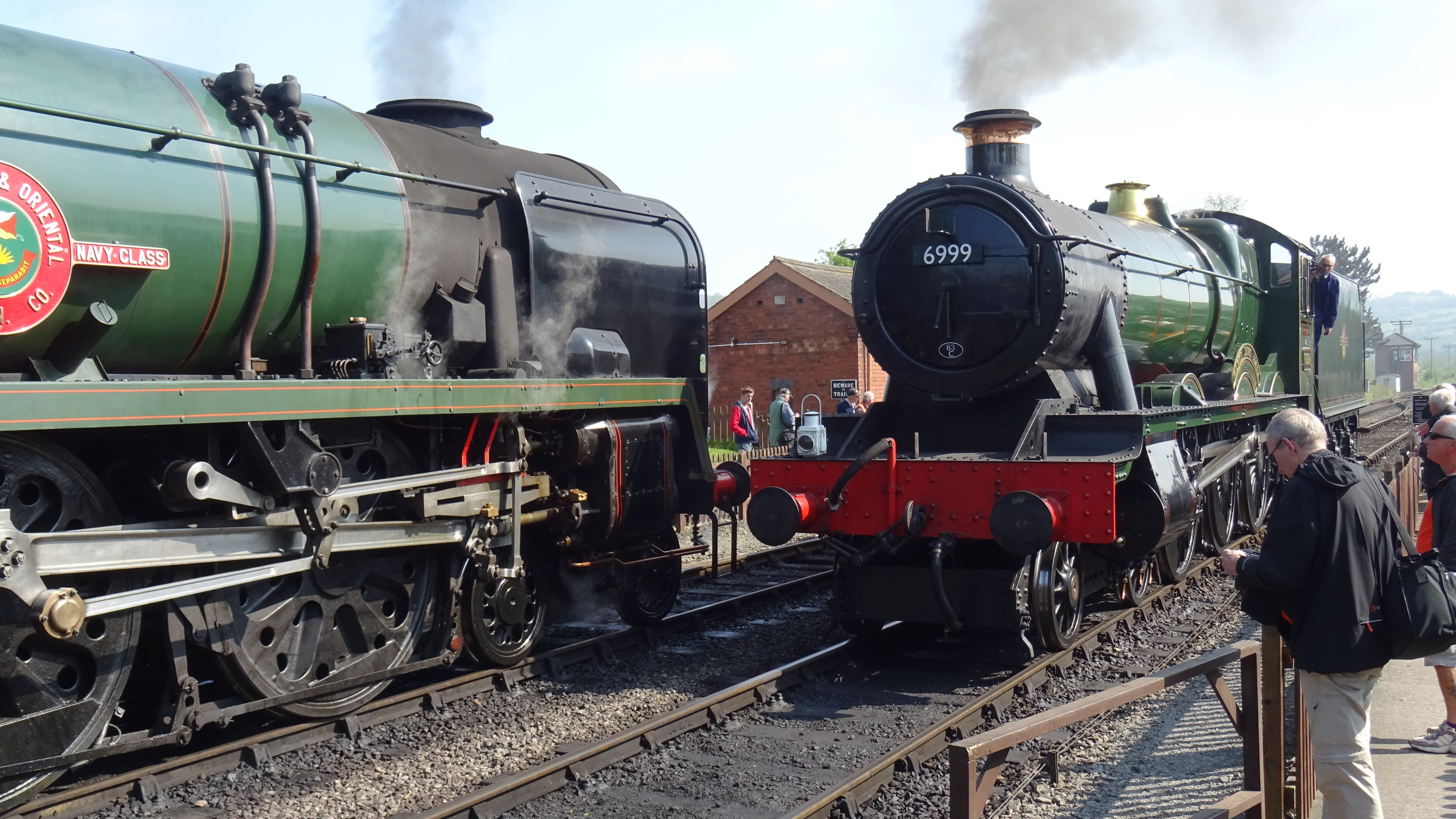
Steam Locomotives on both of Toddington's double tracks, May 2023.

The station was inspected by Major Rose of Her Majesty's Railway Inspectorate on 21 March 1984 and authorisation was given for operation of a 2-coach push and pull train over a ¼-mile section of track as far as Didbrook Bridge. The official reopening of the station took place on 22 April 1984 when Nicholas Ridley, the local MP, cut the tape on Easter Sunday. By 2003, the line had been extended south to Cheltenham Racecourse. In late-2005/early-2006, a start was made to relay track north towards Broadway, and the first 2 miles (3.2 km) of this section, as far as Laverton Halt, re-opened in March 2011.

== Sources ==
- Baker, Audie (1994). The Stratford on Avon to Cheltenham Railway. Grasscroft, Oldham: Irwell Press. ISBN 978-1-871608-62-5.
- Butt, R.V.J. (1995). The Directory of Railway Stations. Yeovil: Patrick Stephens Ltd. ISBN 1-85260-508-1. R508.
- Clinker, C.R. (October 1978). Clinker's Register of Closed Passenger Stations and Goods Depots in England, Scotland and Wales 1830-1977. Bristol: Avon-Anglia Publications & Services. ISBN 0-905466-19-5.
- Kingscott, Geoffrey (2009). Lost Railways of Warwickshire. Newbury, Berkshire: Countryside Books. ISBN 978-1-84674-174-6.
- Maggs, Colin G.; Nicholson, Peter (1985). The Honeybourne Line: The continuing story of the Cheltenham to Honeybourne and Stratford upon Avon Railway. Cheltenham, Glos.: Line One Publishing. ISBN 978-0-907036-12-8.
- Mitchell, Victor E.; Smith, Keith (August 2005) [1998]. Stratford upon Avon to Cheltenham. Country Railway Routes. Midhurst: Middleton Press. ISBN 1-901706-25-7.
- Oppitz, Leslie (2004) [2002]. Lost Railways of Herefordshire & Worcestershire. Newbury, Berkshire: Countryside Books. ISBN 978-1-85306-754-9.
- Yorke, Stan (2009). Lost Railways of Gloucestershire. Newbury, Berkshire: Countryside Books. ISBN 978-1-84674-163-0.
