= Woodmancote, Tewkesbury Borough =

Village in Gloucestershire, England

Coordinates: 51.943607°N 2.042739°W

Woodmancote
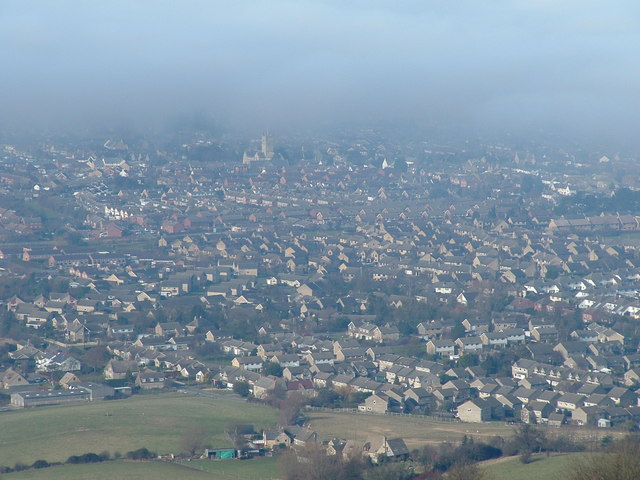
- Bishops Cleeve and Woodmancote from Cleeve Hill

- Location within Gloucestershire
- Population: 3,029 (2011 Census)
- OS grid reference: SO971272
- Civil parish: Woodmancote
- District: Tewkesbury
- Shire county: Gloucestershire
- Region: South West
- Country: England
- Sovereign state: United Kingdom
- Post town: Cheltenham
- Postcode district: GL52
- Dialling code: 01242
- Police: Gloucestershire
- Fire: Gloucestershire
- Ambulance: South Western

Woodmancote is a village and civil parish in Gloucestershire, England. The parish lies immediately east of Bishop's Cleeve; the village is about 3 1/2 miles (6 km) north of Cheltenham. In old English the name meant 'woodmen's cottage' and an early form was Wudumannacote. In the southeast of the parish is the small village of Cleeve Hill, under the slopes of the hill of the same name.

There is also an area called Woodmancote in Dursley, also in Gloucestershire.

== History ==
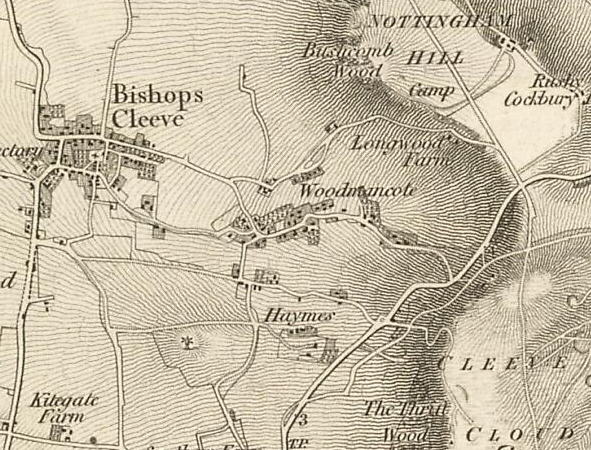

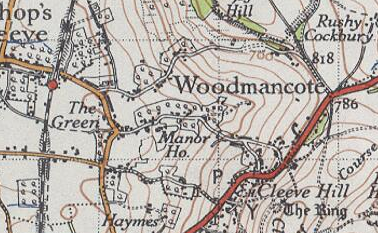

The maps above highlight the fact that no significant development occurred between 1828 and 1945, only infrastructure such as new roads and a railway line seem to be new features. The physical lack of development is also shown in its neighbouring village Bishop's Cleeve. It does show a large amount of arable land as fields in both maps. This would suggest that the people who lived there were mostly working in agriculture for many generations.

The Domesday Book (1086) does not include Woodmancote. It became a place in its own right when estates in the area were organised by the Bishop's officers around 1170. Over centuries Woodmancote remained an area of smallholdings and arable fields. Only in 1847 the traditional farming of the villagers on medieval open-fields ended, as arable land became enclosed into the fields we see today. For 600 years Bishop's Cleeve and Woodmancote have been hard to define as two separate parishes. This was because both were "in the same manor of the Bishop of Worcester and so it is often impossible to distinguish in his records". The Black Death saw one third of the population of Bishop's Cleeve and Woodmancote die.

Haymes is a hamlet within Woodmancote at the top of Cleve Hill: Haymes House is a Grade II listed Georgian mansion.

In the 1870s, Woodmancote was described by John Marius Wilson's Imperial Gazetteer of England and Wales as:

"a hamlet in Bishops-Cleeve parish, Gloucester; 3½ miles W by S of Winchcomb. Real property, £2,459; of which £40 are in quarries. Pop., 431. Houses, 100.".

The village is the home of the Woodmancote Evangelical Free Church, part of the Countess of Huntingdon's Connexion.

== Boundaries ==
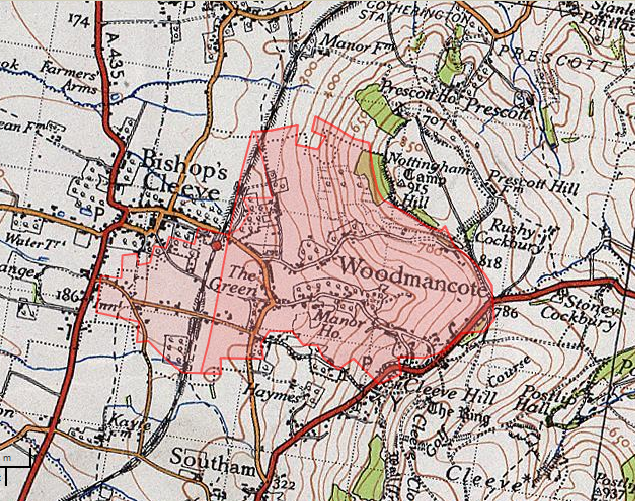

The map above shows the change in boundaries of the Woodmancote civil parish over time, with the newer boundary line adjacent to the railway line and the old boundary covering roughly half of what today is part of Bishop's Cleeve.

The boundaries of Woodmancote changed in 1883 and 1953. It gained 120 acres from the Bushcombe Island that was part of Bishop’s Cleeve. It gained again another 46 acres in April 1953 but lost 143 acres south of Station Road to Bishop’s Cleeve. The railway line is still part of Woodmancote. Since 1953, the village comprises 886 acres.

== Infrastructure and development ==
In 1886 a medical examiner of Woodmancote reported very serious sanitary problems. Nearly all of the drinking water sources such as wells and ditches were condemned. Woodmancote was connected to mains water four years later in 1891. The first telephone exchange in Woodmancote was opened by the National Telephone Company in 1899. The local hotel named the Rising Sun was the first to receive a number which was 502.

The Cheltenham District Gas Company supplied gas to Woodmancote from around 1925. Electricity was not supplied until after World War II, however Cleeve Hill had mains installed underground in the 1930s.

Woodmancote's development has been stunted because of where it is located: its position at the foot of Cleeve Hill gives the settlement only a westerly direction to expand, but only to an extent before it reaches the boundary of Bishop's Cleeve.

=== Transport ===
The main road running through Woodmancote is called Station Road as it led to Bishop's Cleeve railway station. This road leads straight into Bishop's Cleeve to the west and Cheltenham to the south. From there, the M5 is easily accessible.

Woodmancote and Bishop's Cleeve were once served by a railway line that divides the two parishes. It was created on 1 June 1906 by the Great Western Railway which ran from Stratford-upon-Avon and finished at Cheltenham. The railway station closed on 7 March 1960 and was demolished. An accident occurred later on the railway line which led to its dismantlement by 1980. A 12-mile stretch of the track has been reconstructed through Woodmancote which has been reopened and is now preserved as heritage of the Gloucestershire Warwickshire Railway.

In November 2022, the only bus service in the village was withdrawn.

== Education ==
In the 1841 census, the first schoolteacher was recorded for Woodmancote, George Sheppard at the age of 25. In the 1851 census, three women schoolmistresses were recorded but in the 1861 census none remained in the village. It wasn't until 1906 to 1910 that a school was started by Miss Waghorne. A larger, six-classroom primary school was built by the County Council in 1972 on Station Road.

== Population ==
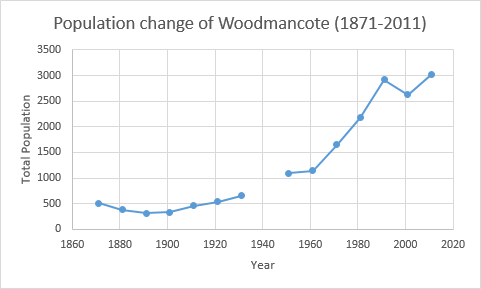

This graph shows the total population at 10 year intervals recorded by the Census in the United Kingdom since 1871 (no census data from 1941 as the National census did not occur then).

As from 2011, Woodmancote had a population of 3,029 according to the 2011 census. The graph shows an initial decrease in total population from the years 1871-1891 to 312, however from that point the population gradually increased to the year 1961 with 1,146 inhabitants. From that point the increase accelerated with a sudden drop from 2,922 in 1991 to 2,630 in 2001.

Woodmancotes Demographics is typical of a rural village as it has an increasingly aging population.

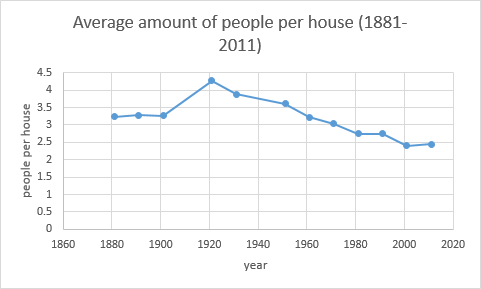

This graph shows the average number of people per house in Woodmancote. From 1881 to 1901 there are about 3 people per house, however this increases to almost 4.5 people per house in 1920. From this point it decreases to the current level of 2.5 people per house. As the population graph shows an increase in population during this time, this would mean that there has been an increase in the construction of new houses.

== Employment ==
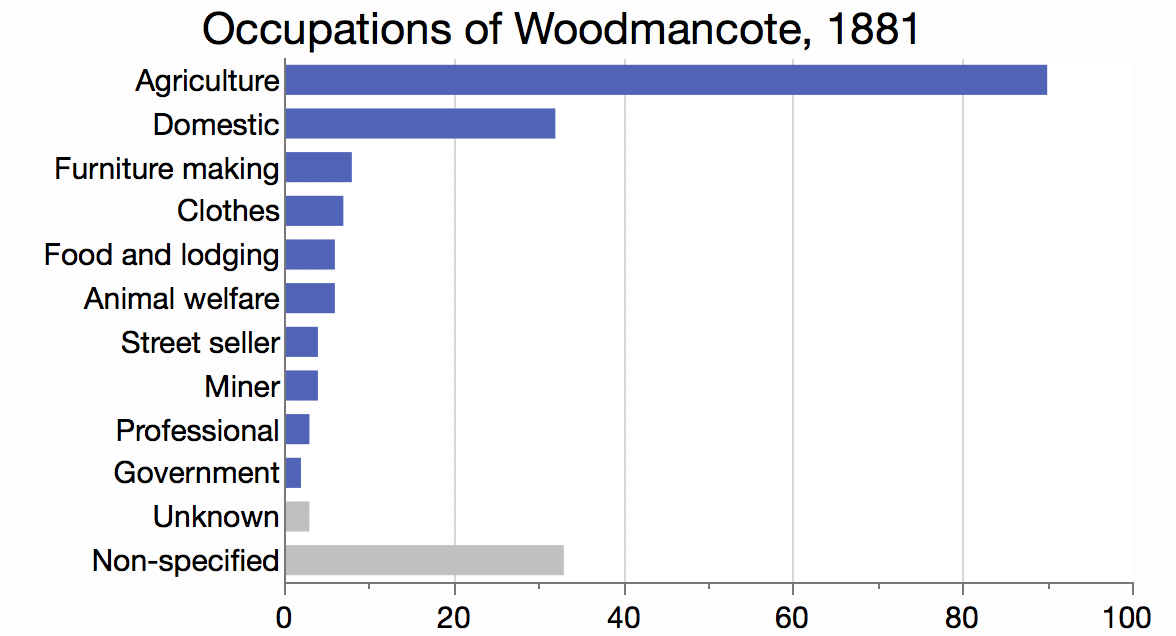
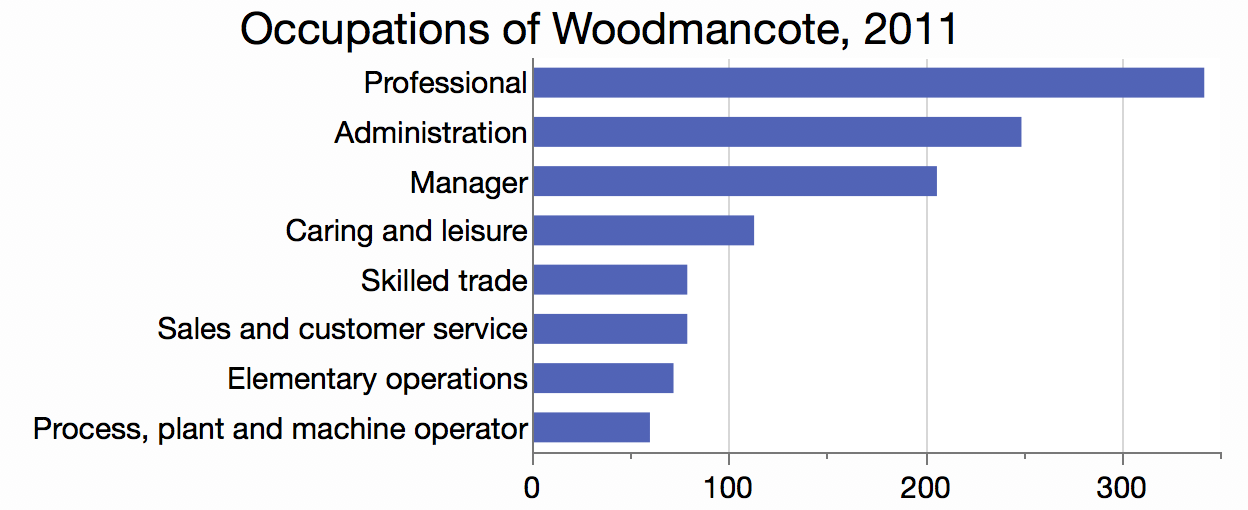

These charts show the types of jobs that occurred in 1881 and 2011 and the number of people who had them as professions. The charts indicate that within the 130 years of these censuses, occupations have developed from the primary sector such as agriculture to the service sector such as administration.
