= Winchcombe railway station =

Heritage railway station in Gloucestershire, England

Winchcombe
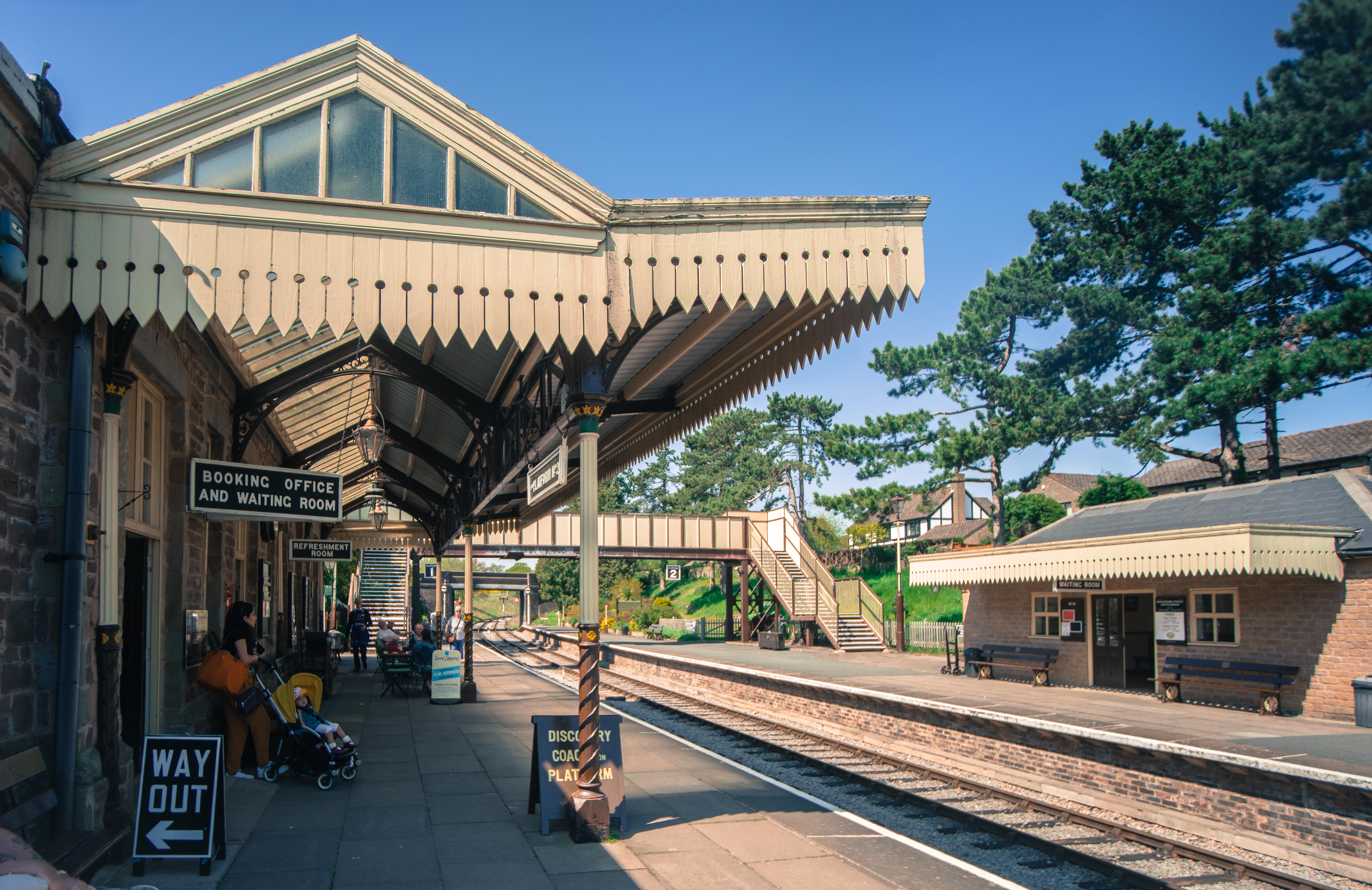
- View from Platform 1

General information
- Location: Greet, Tewkesbury; England
- Coordinates: 51.96645°N 1.96345°W
- Grid reference: SP027297
- System: Station on Heritage Railway
- Operator: Gloucestershire Warwickshire Railway
- Platforms: 2

History
- Original company: Great Western Railway
- Post-grouping: Great Western Railway; Western Region of British Railways

Key dates
- 1 February 1905: Opened
- 7 March 1960: Closed to passengers
- 2 November 1964: Goods facilities withdrawn
- 2 August 1987: Reopened
Location

Winchcombe railway station is a heritage railway station which serves the town of Winchcombe in Gloucestershire, England. The station itself is actually located in the nearby village of Greet. It is located on the Honeybourne Line which linked Cheltenham and Stratford-upon-Avon and which was opened by the Great Western Railway in 1906. The station closed to passengers in 1960, although the line itself remained open for freight and diversionary use until 1976, when a freight train derailed near Winchcombe and damaged the track.

By the late 1970s, the line had been dismantled. The stretch between Toddington and Cheltenham Racecourse, including Winchcombe, has since been reconstructed and reopened by the heritage Gloucestershire Warwickshire Railway. A new station has been erected in Greet, Winchcombe, on the site of the original building, the building being the former station at Monmouth Troy. Nearby is the 693-yard (634 m) Greet Tunnel, the second longest on any preserved line in Britain.

== History ==
On 9 July 1859, the Oxford, Worcester and Wolverhampton Railway opened a line from Stratford-upon-Avon to Honeybourne. The OW&W became the West Midland Railway in 1860 and was acquired by Great Western Railway in 1883 with a view to combining it with the Birmingham to Stratford Line to create a high-speed route from the Midlands to the South West. The GWR obtained authorisation in 1899 for the construction of a double-track line between Honeybourne and Cheltenham and this was completed in stages by 1908.

Winchcombe was opened on 1 February 1905. It is situated close to the small village of Greet but 3/4-mile (1.2 km) to the north of Winchcombe. Two 400 ft (122 m) facing platforms were provided; the original station building built of red brick on a plinth of blue brick was situated on the Down platform. A verandah canopy, similar to that at Broadway, extended from the front of the building to a covered footbridge linking the two platforms. On the Up platform was a passenger waiting shelter and gentlemen's lavatory. The goods yard lay on the south-eastern side of the station and comprised cattle pens, a goods shed, weighbridge and 6-ton crane. A brick-built 31-lever signal box controlled access to the yard, while a 50-wagon Up refuge siding led to the rear of the Up platform. As with Toddington, the station was lit by acetylene lamps with the gas hut situated behind the weighhouse.

From February 1905 to June 1906, Winchcombe was the southern terminus of the line and buses to Cheltenham were provided pending the extension south. From June 1906, eight local services each way ran between Honeybourne and Cheltenham (St James). The completion of the North Warwickshire Line in July 1908 saw the first through services from Wolverhampton to Penzance. By 1938, nine Down and ten Up services ran daily, with three on Sundays. Traffic receipts for 1913 showed that 21,824 passengers had been carried, representing £1,436 in fares collected (equivalent to £143,261 in 2025 (Note: UK Consumer Price Index inflation figures from 1209–2024 based on data from "Inflation calculator". Bank of England. London. 18 February 2026.)), whilst 11,828 tons of goods traffic had been handled (mainly coal/coke and livestock), giving a total income of £5,837 (equivalent to £582,320 in 2025). By 1933, both of these figures had fallen: receipts to £4,436 (equivalent to £274,494 in 2025) and goods tonnage to 8,320. The Second World War however saw tonnage peak at 17,045, with the bulk of it consisting in agricultural machinery, fertilisers and foodstuffs.

Winchcombe closed to passenger traffic on 7 March 1960, the distance between the town and its station contributing to its demise. The goods yard remained open for a further four years until 2 November 1964. By March 1965, the station site had been levelled, leaving only the weighhouse, goods shed and residential accommodation. The signal box remained in operation until 24 February 1965, shortly after which it was demolished. The line remained open to goods and diversionary traffic until 25 August 1976 when the 06.35 Toton to Severn Tunnel Junction derailed at a point east of the bridge carrying the B4632 road linking Winchcombe and Toddington over the line. The incident prompted British Rail to announce the line's closure.

=== Stationmasters ===
- William Joseph Edwards 1905 - ca. 1911 (formerly station master at Leckhampton)
- Mr. Price from 1915 (afterwards station master at Bourton on the Water)
- William Henry Rabjohns ca. 1923
- Percy William Tow ca. 1928
- W. Williams ca. 1928 - 1932 (afterwards station master at Chipping Norton)
- Mr. Jilkes from 1932
- S. Woodward 1940 - 1946 (afterwards station master at Moreton-in-Marsh)
- William Maurice Jennings 1946–1952 (afterwards station master at Littleton and Badsey)

== Present day ==
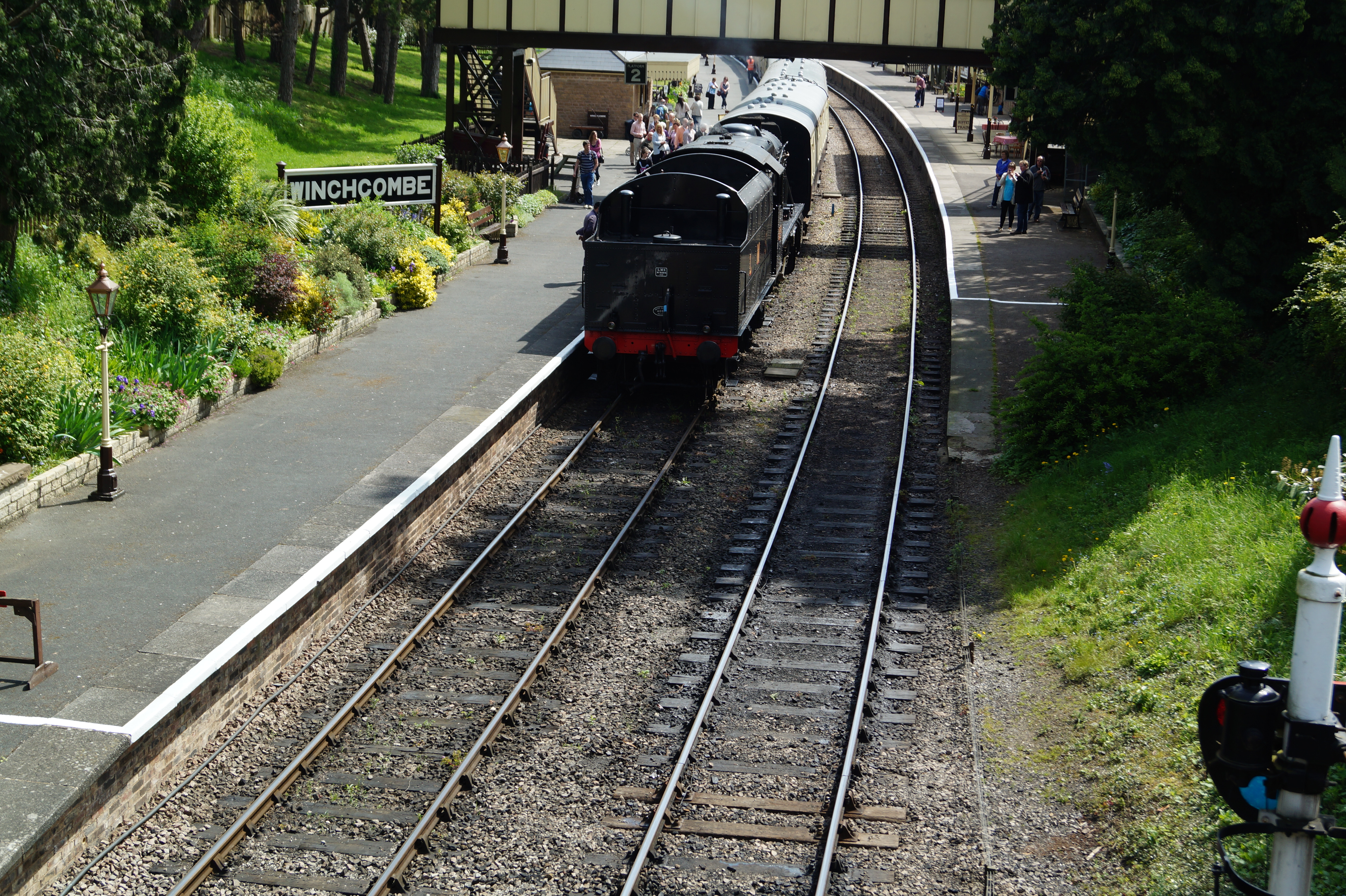
LMS 8F 8274 at Winchcombe awaiting departure with the diner special, May 2014

The Gloucestershire Warwickshire Railway reopened the line between Toddington and Winchcombe on 2 August 1987. A signal box was obtained from Hall Green and rebuilt on the foundations of the original structure, with the 37-lever frame coming from Honeybourne West Loop Box. The former Great Western Railway station building at Monmouth Troy was dismantled stone-by-stone and re-erected at Winchcombe in 1986. The platform slabs came from Birmingham Snow Hill and Cheltenham St James. The only original buildings left are the old goods shed, now the main workshop for the carriage and wagon group on the railway, and the weighbridge. Bidirectional signalling has been installed as has a passing loop through the station, which has been operational since 12 July 1997. Since 2012, the station, and indeed parts of the line itself, have been used for scenes in the television series Father Brown.

Preceding station	Heritage railways	Following station
Gotherington towards Cheltenham Race Course	Gloucestershire Warwickshire Railway	Hayles Abbey Halt towards Broadway
Historical railways
Gretton Halt; Line open, station closed	Great Western Railway; Honeybourne Line	Hayles Abbey Halt; Line open, station open

== Sources ==
- Baker, Audie (1994). The Stratford on Avon to Cheltenham Railway. Grasscroft, Oldham: Irwell Press. ISBN 978-1-871608-62-5.
- Butt, R.V.J. (1995). The Directory of Railway Stations. Yeovil: Patrick Stephens Ltd. ISBN 1-85260-508-1. R508.
- Clinker, C.R. (October 1978). Clinker's Register of Closed Passenger Stations and Goods Depots in England, Scotland and Wales 1830-1977. Bristol: Avon-Anglia Publications & Services. ISBN 0-905466-19-5.
- Kingscott, Geoffrey (2009). Lost Railways of Warwickshire. Newbury, Berkshire: Countryside Books. ISBN 978-1-84674-174-6.
- Maggs, Colin G.; Nicholson, Peter (1985). The Honeybourne Line: The continuing story of the Cheltenham to Honeybourne and Stratford upon Avon Railway. Cheltenham, Glos.: Line One Publishing. ISBN 978-0-907036-12-8.
- Mitchell, Victor E.; Smith, Keith (August 2005) [1998]. Stratford upon Avon to Cheltenham. Country Railway Routes. Midhurst: Middleton Press. ISBN 1-901706-25-7.
- Oppitz, Leslie (2004) [2002]. Lost Railways of Herefordshire & Worcestershire. Newbury, Berkshire: Countryside Books. ISBN 978-1-85306-754-9.
- Yorke, Stan (2009). Lost Railways of Gloucestershire. Newbury, Berkshire: Countryside Books. ISBN 978-1-84674-163-0.
