= Hayles Abbey Halt railway station =

Former railway station in England

Coordinates: 51.97521°N 1.93314°W

Hayles Abbey Halt
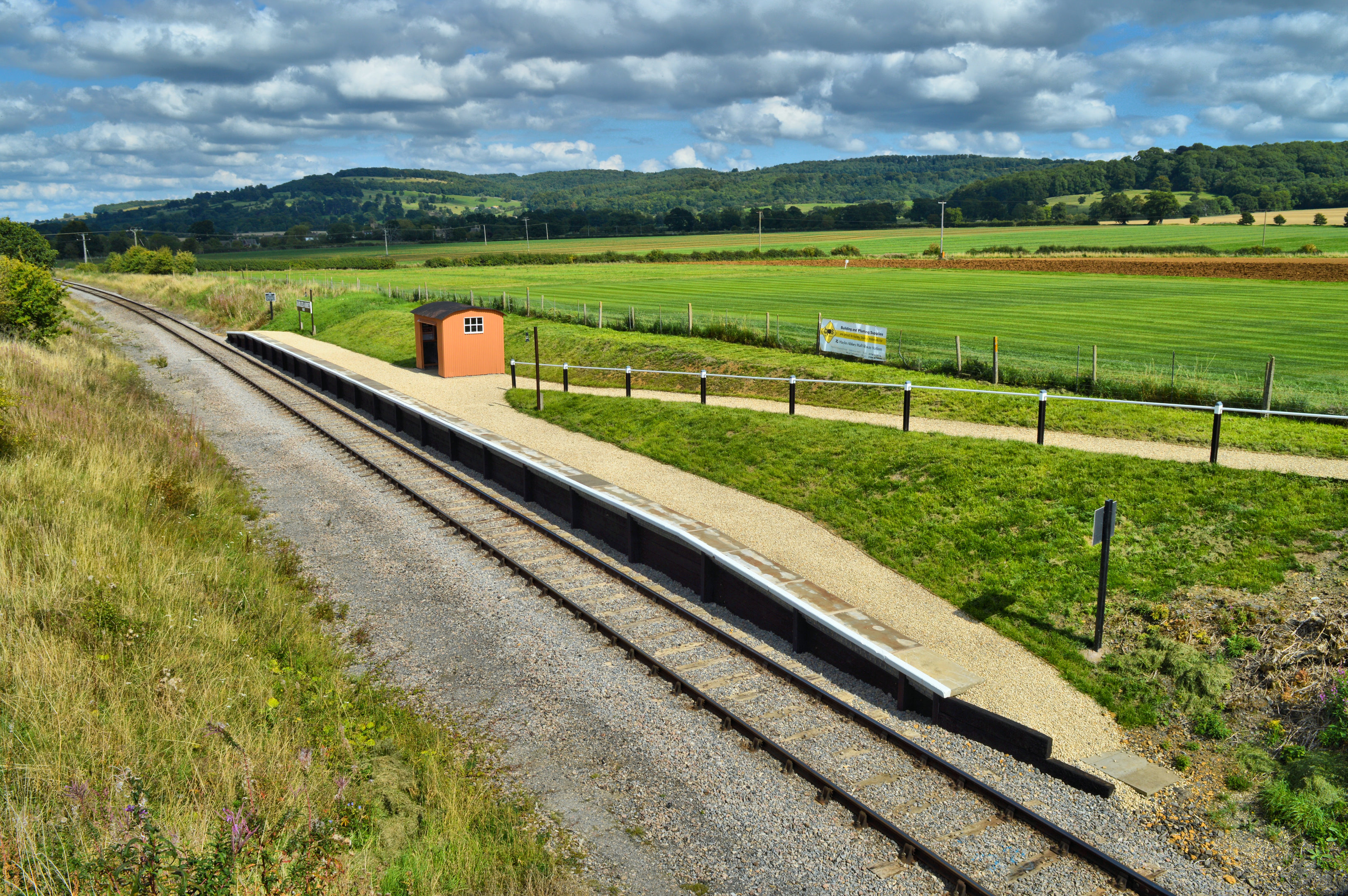
- The halt in September 2017.

General information
- Location: Hailes, Tewkesbury; England
- Platforms: 1 (original was 2)

Other information
- Status: Was disused. Reopened 5 June 2017 in preservation.

History
- Original company: Great Western Railway
- Post-grouping: Great Western Railway; Western Region of British Railways

Key dates
- 24 September 1928: Opened
- 7 March 1960: Closed
- 5 June 2017: Reopened
Location

Hayles Abbey Halt railway station is a halt opened by the Great Western Railway on the Honeybourne Line from Honeybourne to Cheltenham which served the hamlet of Hailes in Gloucestershire, as well as the nearby Hailes Abbey, between 1928 and 1960. The line through the site of the station was reinstated in 1985 and opened in 1987 by the Gloucestershire Warwickshire Railway, although for many years no new halt was provided. The halt was eventually reopened on 5 June 2017 after being rebuilt by volunteers. Unlike the original, however, it only has a single platform. It lies between Toddington and Winchcombe stations.

== History ==
On 9 July 1859, the Oxford, Worcester and Wolverhampton Railway opened a line from Stratford-upon-Avon to Honeybourne. The OW&W became the West Midland Railway in 1860 and was acquired by Great Western Railway in 1883 with a view to combining it with the Birmingham to Stratford Line to create a high-speed route from the Midlands to the South West. The GWR obtained authorisation in 1899 for the construction of a double-track line between Honeybourne and Cheltenham and this was completed in stages by 1908.

Hayles Abbey Halt was opened on 24 September 1928. Situated 10 miles 38 chains (16.9 km) from Honeybourne East Loop, the station consisted of two facing platforms constructed of sleepers, on each of which was a small corrugated iron passenger waiting shelter. Footpaths from the adjacent road led to the platforms which were lit by oil lamps maintained by porters at Toddington whose stationmaster had overall responsibility for the station.

The provision of the halt coincided with the opening of a museum at nearby Hailes Abbey, a ruined Cistercian abbey founded in 1246 by Richard of Cornwall. By July 1932, the station was served by six daily railmotor services from Honeybourne to Cheltenham and back, plus one Honeybourne to Winchcombe and back. The Sunday offering consisted of two services from Honeybourne to Cheltenham and back. Nearly 30 years later, the final timetable for Hayles Abbey Halt showed the same service pattern, the only difference being an additional service to Honeybourne on weekdays. The station closed on 7 March 1960, the same day on which the local passenger service was withdrawn from the Honeybourne Line.

Preceding station	Heritage railways	Following station
Winchcombe towards Cheltenham Race Course	Gloucestershire Warwickshire Railway	Toddington towards Broadway
Historical railways
Winchcombe; Line and station open	Great Western Railway; Honeybourne Line	Toddington; Line and station open

== Present day ==
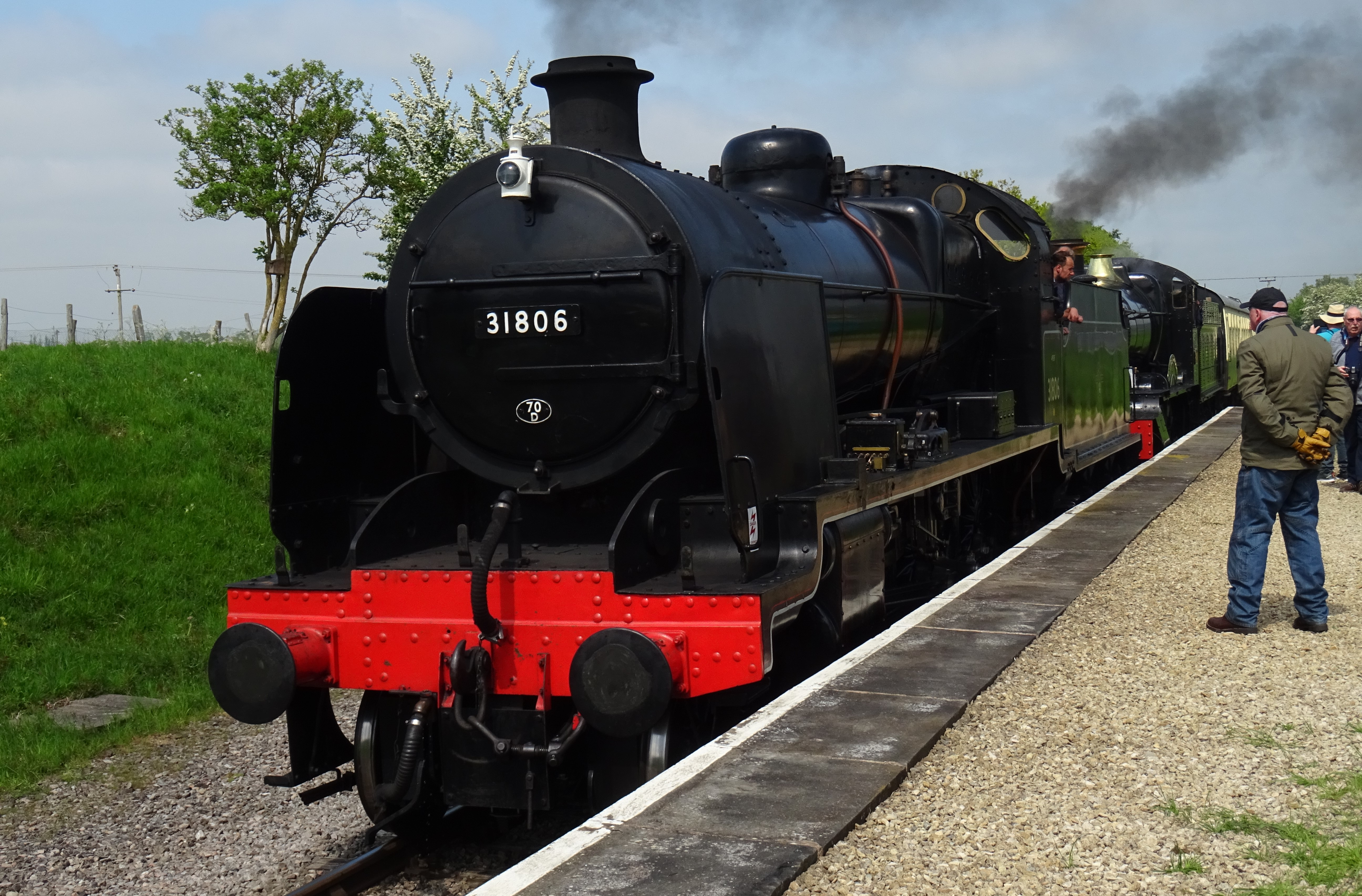
A doubleheader train making a brief stop at Hayles Abbey Halt in May 2023.

The Gloucestershire Warwickshire Railway (GWSR) have reopened the line through Hayles Abbey Halt, with the first services between Toddington and Winchcombe running on 2 August 1987. It is just a half mile from Hailes Abbey itself, protected by English Heritage.

Although a new halt was planned on the site in 1998, this did not materialise. In March 2015, it was reported that the board of the GWSR had authorised the reconstruction of the station to a design to match the original. However, unlike the original, only a single two-coach platform will be provided on the Cotswolds side of the line. In June 2016, it was confirmed that a corrugated iron shelter, recovered from Usk and similar to the one originally at Hayles Abbey Station, would be erected.

By January 2017, work was finally underway on the reconstruction of Hayles Abbey Halt, which has a single platform. The halt finally reopened as a request stop on 5 June 2017. There are no parking facilities at the station.

== Sources ==
- Baker, Audie (1994). The Stratford on Avon to Cheltenham Railway. Grasscroft, Oldham: Irwell Press. ISBN 978-1-871608-62-5.
- Butt, R.V.J. (1995). The Directory of Railway Stations. Yeovil: Patrick Stephens Ltd. ISBN 1-85260-508-1. R508.
- Clinker, C.R. (October 1978). Clinker's Register of Closed Passenger Stations and Goods Depots in England, Scotland and Wales 1830-1977. Bristol: Avon-Anglia Publications & Services. ISBN 0-905466-19-5.
- Kingscott, Geoffrey (2009). Lost Railways of Warwickshire. Newbury, Berkshire: Countryside Books. ISBN 978-1-84674-174-6.
- Maggs, Colin G.; Nicholson, Peter (1985). The Honeybourne Line: The continuing story of the Cheltenham to Honeybourne and Stratford upon Avon Railway. Cheltenham, Glos.: Line One Publishing. ISBN 978-0-907036-12-8.
- Mitchell, Victor E.; Smith, Keith (August 2005) [1998]. Stratford upon Avon to Cheltenham. Country Railway Routes. Midhurst: Middleton Press. ISBN 1-901706-25-7.
- Oppitz, Leslie (2004) [2002]. Lost Railways of Herefordshire & Worcestershire. Newbury, Berkshire: Countryside Books. ISBN 978-1-85306-754-9.
- Yorke, Stan (2009). Lost Railways of Gloucestershire. Newbury, Berkshire: Countryside Books. ISBN 978-1-84674-163-0.
