= Bishop's Cleeve =

Village in Gloucestershire, England

Coordinates: 51.947°N 2.061°W

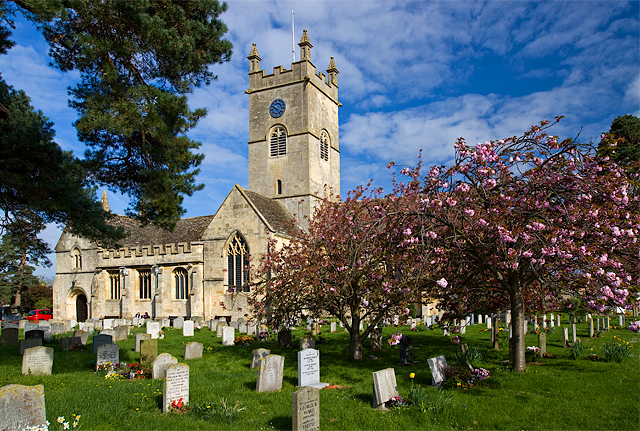
- St Michael & All Angels Church parish church in Bishop's Cleeve

- Location within Gloucestershire
- Population: 14,068 (2021 Census)
- OS grid reference: SO960277
- Civil parish: Bishop's Cleeve
- District: Borough of Tewkesbury
- Shire county: Gloucestershire
- Region: South West
- Country: England
- Sovereign state: United Kingdom
- Post town: Cheltenham
- Postcode district: GL52
- Dialling code: 01242
- Police: Gloucestershire
- Fire: Gloucestershire
- Ambulance: South Western

Bishop's Cleeve is a large village and civil parish in the Borough of Tewkesbury in the ceremonial county of Gloucestershire, England. The village lies at the foot of Cleeve Hill, the highest point in the Cotswolds. Bishop's Cleeve had a population of 10,612 in 2011, which has increased to 14,068 in the 2021 Census. The village is 13 miles (21 km) from Gloucester and 44 miles (71 km) from Oxford. The village is also close to the towns of Cheltenham 4.6 miles (7.4 km), Tewkesbury 7.3 miles (11.7 km), Evesham 13.2 miles (21.2 km), and Malvern 20 miles (32 km).

== Etymology ==
The name Cleeve, first attested in the eighth century as Clife, comes from the dative singular form of the Old English word clif ('at the cliff, bank, steep hill'). The element 'Bishop's' became attached to the name because the estate was owned by the bishops of Worcester.

== Railway past ==
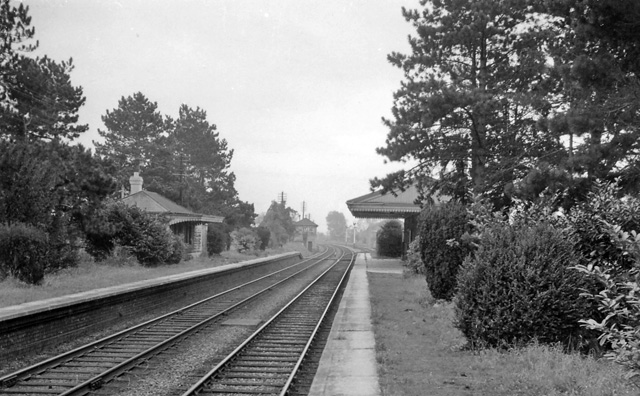
The railway station during its operation

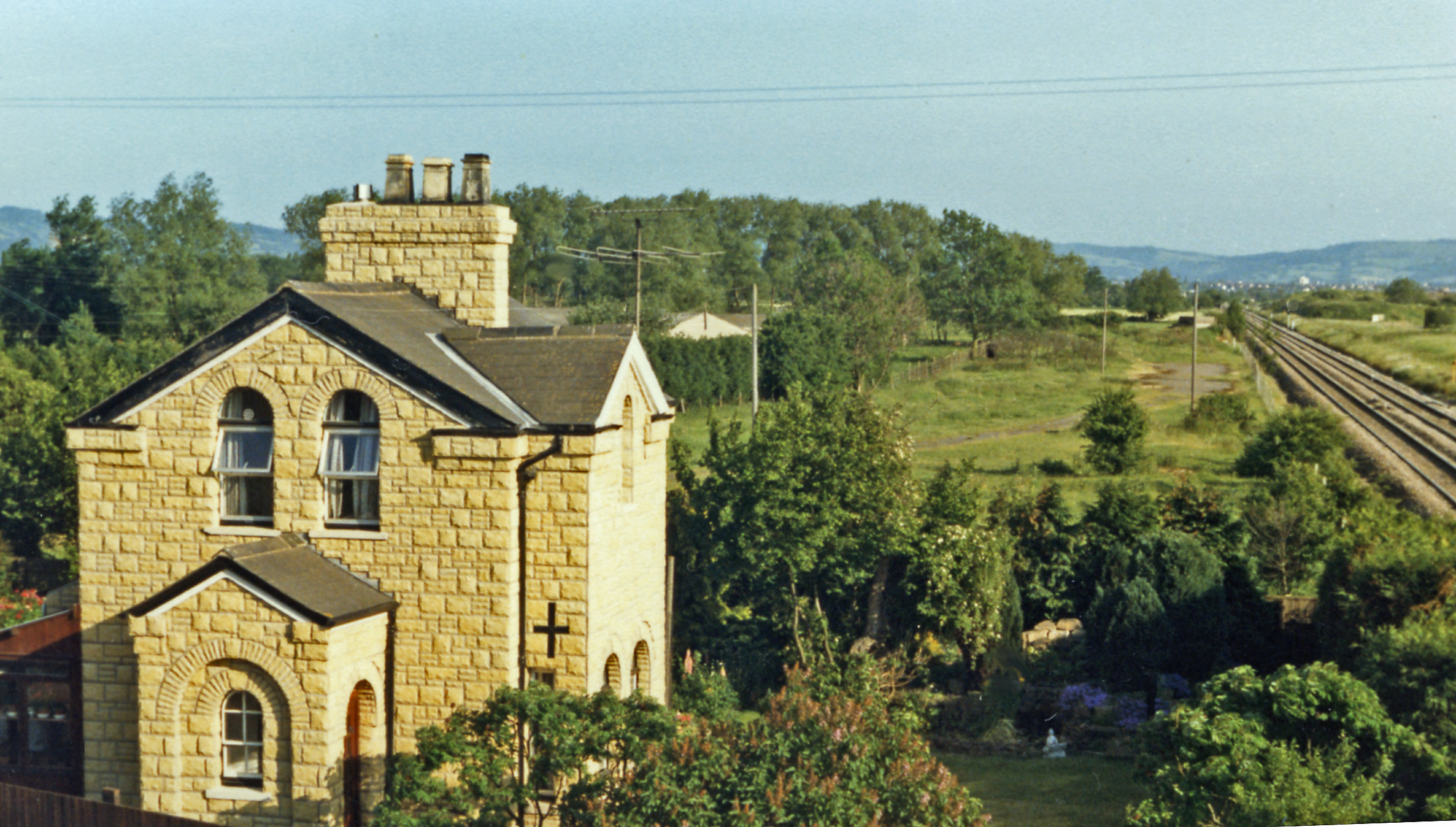
Site of the station after closure

Bishop's Cleeve was once served by a railway line, a relative latecomer in British railway history, opened on 1 June 1906 by the Great Western Railway and running from Stratford-upon-Avon to Cheltenham, part of a mainline from Birmingham to the South West and South Wales. Bishop's Cleeve railway station along with almost all others on this section closed on 7 March 1960 and was subsequently demolished, but the nearby Cheltenham Racecourse railway station remained in operation for royal visits to the racecourse until 1965; through passenger services continued until 25 March 1968, and goods until 1976 when a derailment (railway accident) at Winchcombe damaged the line.

With the damage done, It was decided not to bring the section back into use and by 1980 the entire line had been dismantled. However, the 15-mile (24 km) stretch of track between Broadway and Cheltenham Racecourse had since been reconstructed, reopened and preserved as the Heritage Gloucestershire Warwickshire Railway.

Bishop's Cleeve was also served, though less well, by a station, called Cleeve railway station, on the present Birmingham to Bristol main line (ex-Midland Railway, later LMS), about 1.5 miles (2.4 km) to the west, but this station closed on 20 February 1950.

Bishop's Cleeve is bordered by the village of Woodmancote to the east, the former Great Western railway line dividing the two parishes. In 2020, the population of Bishop's Cleeve was 16,477.

== Education ==
Bishop's Cleeve has three schools; Grangefield Primary School, Bishop's Cleeve Primary Academy, which was built in 1965, and Cleeve School, an academy school in the south-east of the village.

== Infrastructure & Development ==
Bishops Cleeve is served by the A435 running through the western side of the village, with direct access to Cheltenham and Evesham. In 2012, the local police station was closed down, part of the county's aim of saving £18 million across the constabulary. The village benefits from a local library and a wide range of community facilities including sports centres, a youth centre, bowling greens, and a local football club.

In 2010, the development of 450 houses began at Homelands Farm, with the developers, Comparo, wanting to build an extra 550 houses on top of this. This was rejected by Tewkesbury Borough Council in 2007, but the developers appealed to the Secretary of State for Communities and Local Government about the decision, which triggered a full planning inquiry. The main concerns stated were the strain on the local infrastructure it would create, and that the site is prone to flooding. In 2013 the Secretary of State upheld the appeal, 550 dwellings have been built in the north-west of Bishop's Cleeve and a further 500 dwellings are under construction between Gotherington and Cleeve.

== Local shops and businesses ==
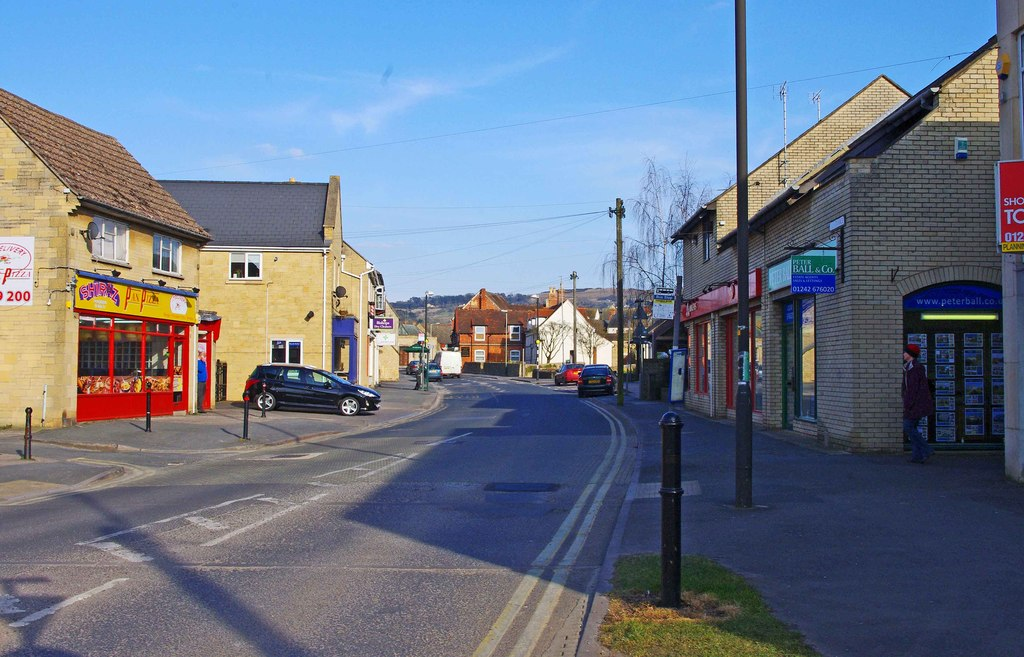
Church Road and its shops, Bishop's Cleeve

There are retail shops in Church Road, Tobyfield Road and The Green. There is an industrial estate with many employers as well as a gym and other facilities. There is also a large business HQ shared by Capita, Lloyds Banking, Zurich and PoloWorks behind Grangefield School. GE Aviation also own a large collection of industrial buildings to the west of the A-road through the village. As well as GE there are many hangars used by companies for helicopter construction and flying; these are especially used during the races in Cheltenham.

== Sport & leisure ==
Bishop's Cleeve has a Non-League football team, Bishop's Cleeve F.C., who play at Kayte Lane. Bishop's Cleeve Colts FC youth football is the grassroots football club that partners BCC FC and has teams from U5s to U16s for both boys and girls, Bishops's Cleeve Colts F.C. There is also a local sports and arts centre on Two Hedges Road, belonging to cleeve school, which provides tarmac netball pitches, cricket nets, tennis courts, squash courts, and a large sports hall.

== Notable people ==
- Squadron Leader Eric Foster, who inspired The Great Escape book and The Great Escape film, died in the village in 2006, aged 102.
- Rebecca Pantaney, Commonwealth Badminton gold medallist was brought up in the village
- Rosemary West, serial killer.
- Nick Ponting – former English badminton player who represented Great Britain at the 1992 and 1996 Summer Olympics and won the 1994 All England Open mixed doubles title.

== Religious sites ==
St Michael & All Angels Church is Grade I listed, with parts dating back over 900 years.
