= Gretton Halt railway station =

Former railway station in Scotland

Coordinates: 51.97259°N 1.99245°W

Gretton Halt
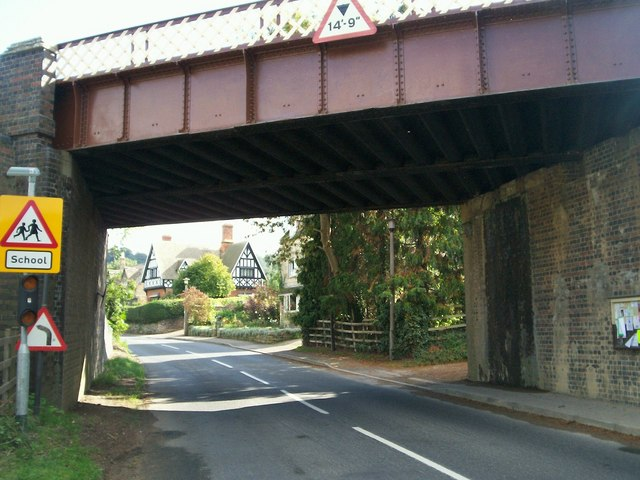
- Bridge 26; access to the station was on the right.

General information
- Location: Gretton, Tewkesbury; England
- Grid reference: SP006304
- Platforms: 2

Other information
- Status: Station disused. Line open in preservation

History
- Original company: Great Western Railway
- Post-grouping: Great Western Railway; Western Region of British Railways

Key dates
- 1 June 1906: Opened
- 7 March 1960: Closed
Location

Gretton Halt railway station was a halt opened by the Great Western Railway on the Honeybourne Line from Honeybourne to Cheltenham which served the small village of Gretton in Gloucestershire between 1906 and 1960. The line through the site of the station was reinstated in 1997 by the Gloucestershire Warwickshire Railway, although no new halt was provided.

== History ==
On 9 July 1859, the Oxford, Worcester and Wolverhampton Railway opened a line from Stratford-upon-Avon to Honeybourne. The OW&W became the West Midland Railway in 1860 and was acquired by Great Western Railway in 1883 with a view to combining it with the Birmingham to Stratford Line to create a high-speed route from the Midlands to the South West. The GWR obtained authorisation in 1899 for the construction of a double-track line between Honeybourne and Cheltenham and this was completed in stages by 1908.

Gretton Halt was opened on 1 June 1906. Situated 8.16 mi (13.13 km) from Cheltenham (St James), it was conveniently located at the western end of the village of Gretton, adjacent to a bridge carrying the line over the main road through the village. The villagers had asked the Great Western Railway to provide a siding, but this was refused by its Traffic Committee on 28 February 1906. Instead, the construction of a halt was authorised at an estimated cost of £310 (equivalent to £32,600 in 2025 (Note: UK Consumer Price Index inflation figures from 1209–2024 based on data from "Inflation calculator". Bank of England. London. 18 February 2026.)). The station consisted of two facing 100 ft (30 m)-long wooden trellis platforms, on each of which was provided a pagoda passenger shelter. A 50 ft (15 m) extension to the platforms was authorised in November 1906 at a cost of £30 (equivalent to £3,154 in 2025).

The timetable for August 1906 shows that Gretton Halt was served by seven weekday railmotor services each way between Honeybourne and St James. This figure had dropped to five by 1947, but rose to six by 1959. The station came under the responsibility of the stationmaster at Winchcombe. It was used by author and engineer L. T. C. Rolt who lived in nearby Stanley Pontlarge in the 1920s. Gretton Halt closed on 7 March 1960, the same day on which the local passenger service was withdrawn from the Honeybourne Line.

Preceding station	Historical railways	Following station
Gotherington; Line and station open	Great Western Railway; Honeybourne Line	Winchcombe; Line and station open

== Present day ==
The Gloucestershire Warwickshire Railway have reopened the line through the site of Gretton Halt, with the first services between Winchcombe and Gotherington running in 1997.

The bridge adjacent to the site of Gretton Halt (bridge 26) underwent repairs in 2009 following a collision by a lorry.

== Sources ==
- Baker, Audie (1994). The Stratford on Avon to Cheltenham Railway. Grasscroft, Oldham: Irwell Press. ISBN 978-1-871608-62-5.
- Butt, R.V.J. (1995). The Directory of Railway Stations. Yeovil: Patrick Stephens Ltd. ISBN 1-85260-508-1. R508.
- Clinker, C.R. (October 1978). Clinker's Register of Closed Passenger Stations and Goods Depots in England, Scotland and Wales 1830-1977. Bristol: Avon-Anglia Publications & Services. ISBN 0-905466-19-5.
- Kingscott, Geoffrey (2009). Lost Railways of Warwickshire. Newbury, Berkshire: Countryside Books. ISBN 978-1-84674-174-6.
- Maggs, Colin G.; Nicholson, Peter (1985). The Honeybourne Line: The continuing story of the Cheltenham to Honeybourne and Stratford upon Avon Railway. Cheltenham, Glos.: Line One Publishing. ISBN 978-0-907036-12-8.
- Mitchell, Victor E.; Smith, Keith (August 2005) [1998]. Stratford upon Avon to Cheltenham. Country Railway Routes. Midhurst: Middleton Press. ISBN 1-901706-25-7.
- Oppitz, Leslie (2004) [2002]. Lost Railways of Herefordshire & Worcestershire. Newbury, Berkshire: Countryside Books. ISBN 978-1-85306-754-9.
- Yorke, Stan (2009). Lost Railways of Gloucestershire. Newbury, Berkshire: Countryside Books. ISBN 978-1-84674-163-0.
