= Stanway Viaduct =

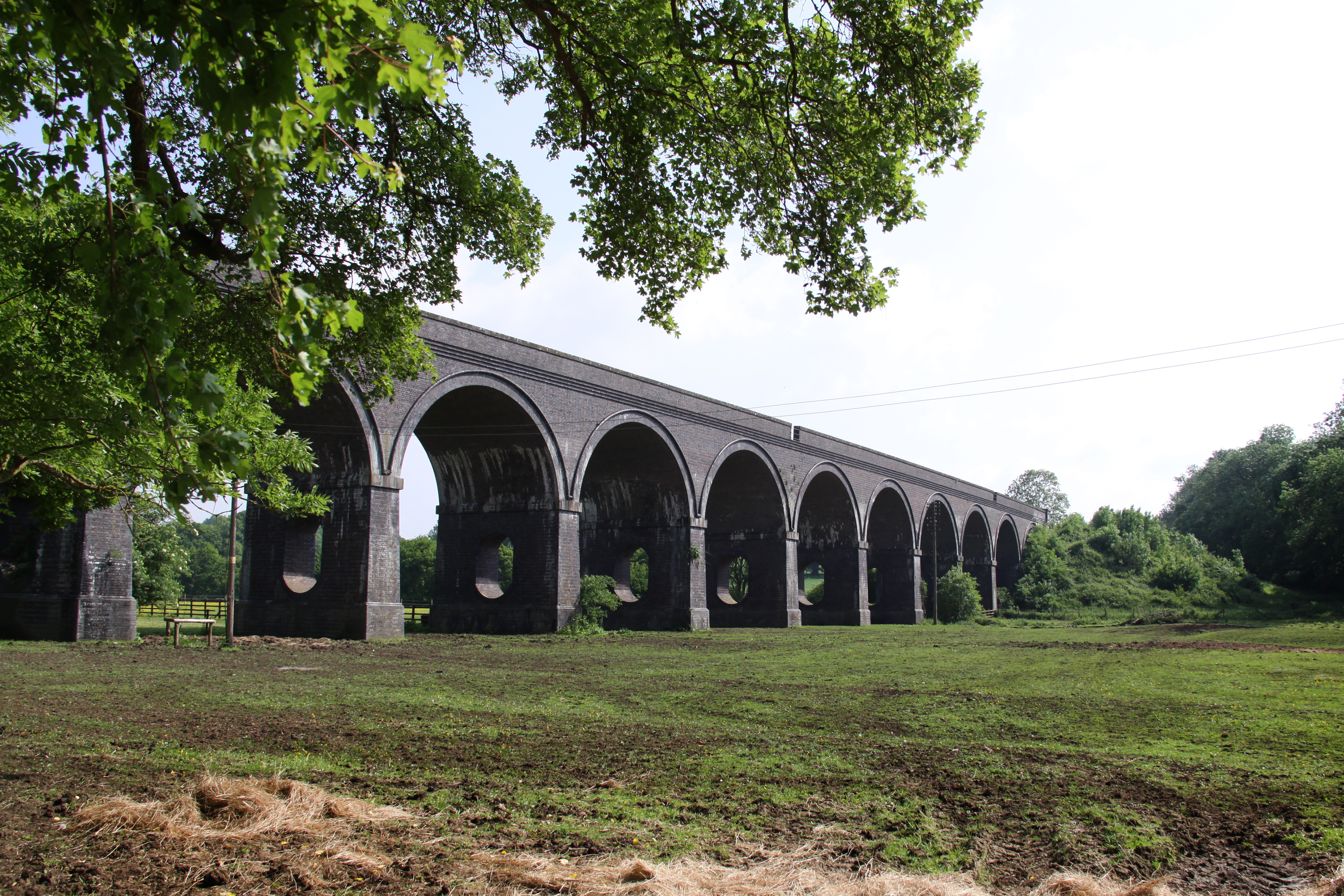
- Coordinates: 51°59′50.67″N 1°55′33.01″W
- Carries: Gloucestershire Warwickshire Railway

Characteristics
- No. of spans: 15

Rail characteristics
- No. of tracks: 1

History
- Construction end: 1904

Stanway Viaduct is a viaduct located in Gloucestershire, UK. It carries the Gloucestershire Warwickshire Railway

== History ==
During construction on 13 November 1903, three arches suddenly collapsed while a mobile crane was on top of the viaduct. Four workers were killed and several others were injured. A fourth arch collapsed the following day. By November 1904, the viaduct had been completed.

The line across the viaduct was closed in 1976. The viaduct was reopened to heritage rail services in May 2010 following an extension of the Gloucestershire Warwickshire Railway.

In March 2023, the Gloucestershire Warwickshire Railway launched a campaign to raise £1.5 million to fund repairs which it said were needed due to water penetration in the structure.

== Structure ==
The viaduct has fifteen arches, each 36 feet (11 metres) high.
