= Gotherington railway station =

Former railway station in England

Gotherington
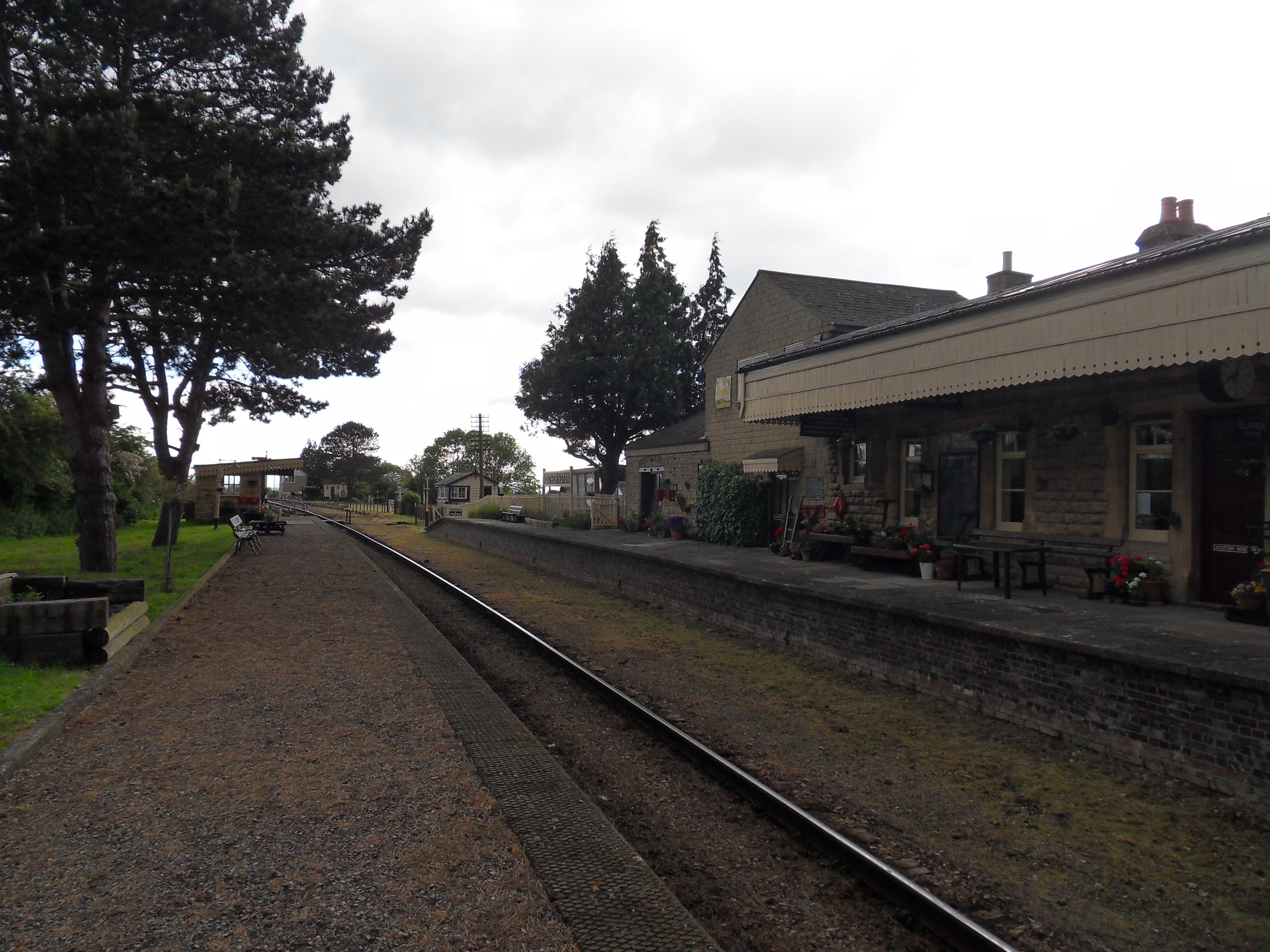
- Gotherington station

General information
- Location: Gotherington, Tewkesbury; England
- Coordinates: 51.9672°N 2.0378°W
- Grid reference: SO974298
- System: Station on heritage railway
- Operator: Gloucestershire Warwickshire Railway
- Platforms: was 2 now 1

History
- Original company: Great Western Railway
- Pre-grouping: Great Western Railway
- Post-grouping: Great Western Railway

Key dates
- 1 June 1906: Station opened as Gotherington
- 1 December 1940: Renamed Gotherington Halt
- 13 June 1955: Station closed
- 1997: Reopened in preservation
Location

Gotherington railway station is a railway station serving the village of Gotherington in Gloucestershire, England. The station is located just to the north of the village.

It is located on the former Cheltenham to Stratford-upon-Avon line, which was opened by the Great Western Railway in 1906. The station opened as Gotherington on 1 June 1906; it was renamed Gotherington Halt on 1 December 1940, and was closed on 13 June 1955. It was the first station to close on this route (most of the other stations closed in 1960). The line itself remained open until 1976. The track was later lifted by 1979.

== Preservation ==
The line was relaid by the Gloucestershire Warwickshire Railway, during the mid-1990s reaching Gotherington in 1997. Trains recommenced the same year, and were extended to Cheltenham Racecourse in April 2003.

The station buildings are privately owned, so trains use the opposite platform. During major events the private garden is opened to passengers and the station house becomes a tea room. A short length of track in the garden allows rides on a Wickham or pump trolley.

=== Signalling ===
Just south of Gotherington station is a passing loop controlled by a new signal box. When the box is switched in, it breaks the very long section between Winchcombe and Cheltenham Racecourse, then short section token working is in use from Cheltenham Racecourse Station to Gotherington, and Gotherington to Winchcombe. There is also a provision for Down trains to terminate at the Gotherington, use the loop to run round the train and return to Winchcombe.

Preceding station	Heritage railways	Following station
Cheltenham Race Course Terminus	Gloucestershire Warwickshire Railway	Winchcombe towards Broadway
Historical railways
Bishops Cleeve; Line open, station closed	Great Western Railway; Honeybourne Line	Gretton Halt; Line open, station closed
