= Gretton, Gloucestershire =

Village in Gloucestershire, England

Coordinates: 51°58′N 1°59′W

Gretton
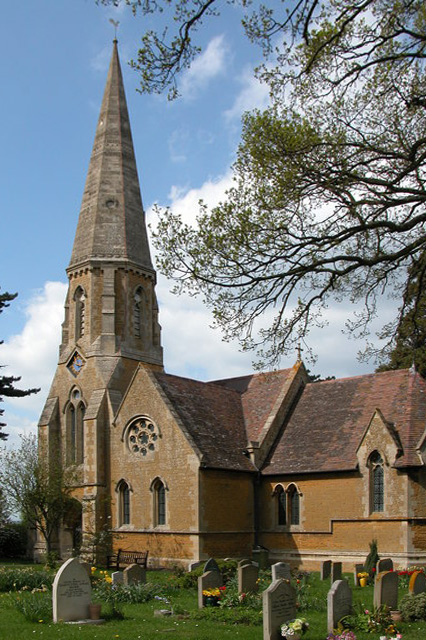
- Gretton Church
- Region: South West
- Country: England
- Sovereign state: United Kingdom

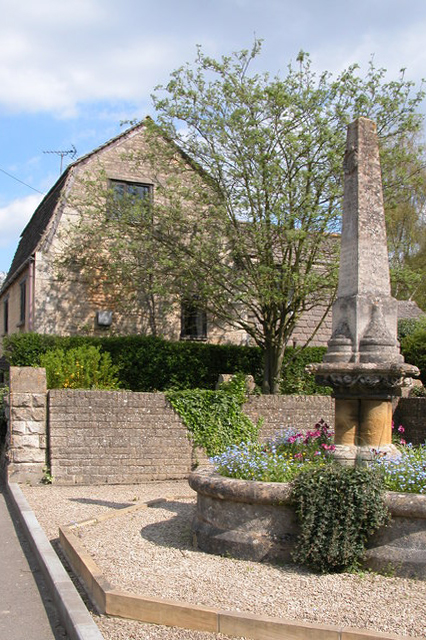
Gretton War Memorial

Gretton is a small village located at the foot of the western scarp of the Cotswolds, about 9 miles north of Cheltenham in the English county of Gloucestershire. The population taken in mid 2016 was 475.

The place-name 'Gretton' is first attested in 1175, and means 'village or town on gravelly soil'.

The village has a small primary school for children aged 4 to 11 years old, with four mixed aged classes catering for 94 attendees.

The Anglican Church in the village is Christ Church. Its bell tower houses a single bell, weighing four hundredweight (about 200 kg). The War Memorial stands opposite Village Hall.

The village shares the name with the village of Gretton in the county of Northants in the East Midlands. Similarly there is another Gretton in Shropshire.

== Governance ==
Gretton civil parish was created in 1994 from part of Winchcombe parish. The parish falls under the Tewkesbury Borough Council ward of Winchcombe, the Gloucestershire County Council division of Winchcombe and Woodmancote, and the UK Parliament constituency of Tewkesbury, whose MP since 2024 is Cameron Thomas, a Liberal Democrat, who defeated Laurence Robertson, the Conservative incumbent since 1997.

== Railways ==
The village was once served by Gretton Halt railway station which closed in 1960. The Gloucestershire Warwickshire Railway passes the site of the halt en route.

== Notable residents ==
- Wing Commander Bill Loxton - WWII RAF pilot
- Tristan Sharman - Science Communicator
