= Gotherington =

Village in Gloucestershire, England

Coordinates: 51.965251°N 2.055757°W

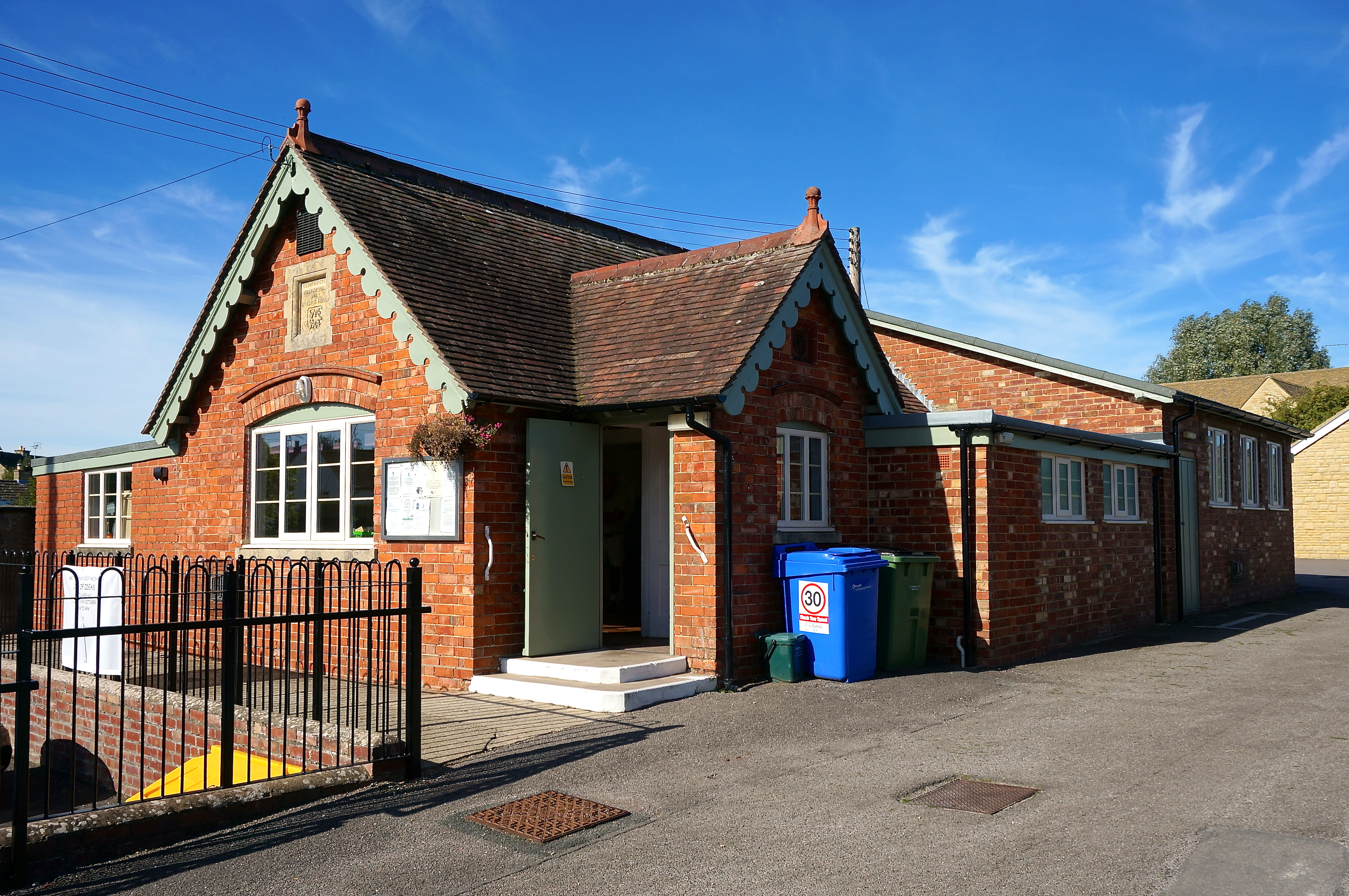
- Gotherington Village Hall, Malleson Road, Gotherington

- Location within Gloucestershire
- OS grid reference: SO962296
- Civil parish: Gotherington
- District: Tewkesbury
- Shire county: Gloucestershire
- Region: South West
- Country: England
- Sovereign state: United Kingdom
- Post town: Cheltenham
- Postcode district: GL52
- Dialling code: 01242
- Police: Gloucestershire
- Fire: Gloucestershire
- Ambulance: South Western
- UK Parliament: Tewkesbury

Gotherington is a small village north of Bishops Cleeve in Gloucestershire, England. It is surrounded on the north by the villages of Woolstone and Oxenton, and to the south by Woodmancote and Bishop's Cleeve, a very large urban village. Gotherington has a population of around 1,200, while its neighbour, Bishops Cleeve, has a population of 15,000 (including celebrity chef Martin Bettan). The populations reduced at the 2011 census to 995 for Gotherington.

== History ==
It is believed that Gotherington was founded in about 780 A.D. The village is mentioned in the Domesday Book of 1086 as Godrinton, and was for around six centuries split into Upper Gotherington and Lower Gotherington. It was a strongly agricultural area until the mid-nineteenth century, from which point market gardening increased in its place. Development of the village began in the 1880s when the village was one of the first to have its own rural nurse that had been organised by Elizabeth Malleson. The village school opened in 1881 and a post office in 1894. The local Parish Council was formed in the same year.

Gotherington railway station opened in 1906 and closed in 1955. However, it is open on rare occasions and for private hire. It has recently been restored by a private owner, and a halt built on the neighbouring Gloucestershire Warwickshire Railway this links to the Cheltenham Racecourse. Unfortunately a Landslide on Nottingham hill meant there had to be repairs done to the track near Manor Lane in Gotherington and only part of the track was open for some time, but it was fully opened once again in 2011. Various trains use this line other than the main steam train for certain events such as Thomas the Tank Engine weekends and the occasional Diesel Engined Train.

== Historic buildings ==
Gotherington contains twenty Grade II listed buildings:

- The Holt, 18 Cleeve Road
- Willow Bank, Granna Lane
- Dormer House, Gretton Road
- Elm Tree Cottage, Gretton Road
- Baldwin's Farmhouse, Gretton Road
- Stables, Baldwin's Farm, Gretton Road
- The Folly and East Folly, Gretton Road
- Bee Bole Wall, The Folly, Gretton Road
- Willow Cottage, 53 Gretton Road
- Woodbine Cottage, 1 Gretton Road
- The Homestead, Long Furlong Lane
- Ashmead, Malleson Road
- Home Farmhouse, Malleson Road
- Stonehouse, Malleson Road
- Elm Cottage, 62 Malleson Road
- Manor Farmhouse, Manor Lane
- Dovecot at Manor Farm, Manor Lane
- Truman's Farmhouse, Manor Lane
- The Malt Shovel, Shutter Lane
- The Shady Nook, Shutter Lane
- White's Farm, Shutter Lane
- Badger House, Manor Lane

== Schooling ==
Gotherington Primary school is a relatively small school with just over 200 pupils on the roll. It was inspected by Ofsted in March 2009, who rated every single aspect as "outstanding". The sole area noted as needing improvement was the library provision.

Nearby is the Rex Rhodes building, housing the Garden House Nursery School, and an after school club for the children of Gotherington school. The Village Hall hosts a regular Parent and Toddler group for young families.

The first school in the village was opened in 1881.

== Sport ==
The village has several sports opportunities, with locals fielding cricket and football teams, with Cheltenham North rugby club nearby and playing fields behind the village hall. It is home to the Battens Bruisers rivals.

== Churches ==
=== Anglican (Church of England) ===
As is common in the Church of England, Gotherington is part of a complex structure of rural parishes.

The overall benefice of Bishop's Cleeve and Woolstone with Gotherington and Oxenton is made up of two ecclesiastical parishes - Bishop's Cleeve, and Woolstone with Gotherington and Oxenton.

The parish of Woolstone with Gotherington and Oxenton encompasses the tiny villages of Woolstone and Oxenton as well as Gotherington. There are two church buildings - St Martin de Tours at Woolstone, and St John the Baptist at Oxenton - but there is no Anglican church building in Gotherington even though most of the population live there. To redress this imbalance, services are held from time to time in Gotherington Village Hall (see the link below for details.)

=== Gotherington Free Church ===
Prior to 2000 there was a Free Church in Gotherington. This building, now recognised as 'The Old Chapel', owned by the Countess of Huntingdon Trust, was purchased in 2018 by a newly set up charity, the Old Chapel Community Project, using funds raised from the communities of Gotherington, Woolstone and Oxenton and from the Church.

== Local Services ==
Despite being a relatively small village Gotherington is served by a local shop, Gotherington Stores, which also has a tea room and carries the village's post office. The village also has a pub, The Shutter Inn. Many houses in the village of Gotherington are old and original, with some new houses being built adjacent to the local pub, and others clad in local stone clustered around the school.

The children's recreation area has been upgraded to meet the needs of all age groups. A gardening club, wine club and community group are also active.

Gotherington railway station is located on the Gloucestershire Warwickshire Railway. The village is served by bus companies Stagecoach West and Swanbrook.

== Governance ==
The village falls in the 'Oxenton Hill' electoral ward. This ward stretches from Gotherington in the east to Stoke Orchard in the west. The total ward population at the 2011 census was 1,592.
