= Bishops Cleeve railway station =

Disused railway station in Tewkesbury, England

Bishop's Cleeve
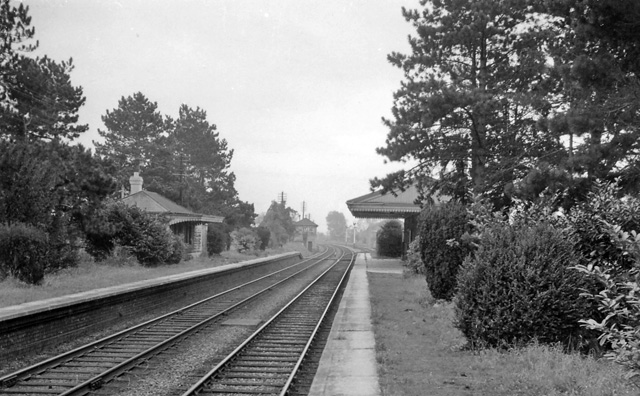
- The railway station in 1962

General information
- Location: Bishop's Cleeve, Tewkesbury; England
- Coordinates: 51.9474°N 2.0504°W
- Grid reference: SO966276
- Platforms: 2

Other information
- Status: Disused

History
- Original company: Great Western Railway
- Pre-grouping: Great Western Railway
- Post-grouping: Great Western Railway

Key dates
- 1 June 1906: Station opens
- 7 March 1960: Station closed
Location

Bishop's Cleeve railway station was a railway station that served the village of Bishop's Cleeve in Gloucestershire, England.

It was opened by the Great Western Railway in 1906, on its line between Stratford-upon-Avon and Cheltenham. It closed in March 1960, and the station was subsequently demolished though the line itself remained open until 1976. The track was later lifted.

From 1997 to 2001 the line was relaid by the Gloucestershire Warwickshire Railway (G-WR) through the station site and later reopened in 2003, though there are currently no plans to rebuild the station site, as of September 2016.

The Midland Railway also opened a station, called Cleeve, on the nearby Birmingham and Gloucester Railway in 1843.

| Preceding station | Historical railways | Following station |
|---|---|---|
| Cheltenham Racecourse; Line and station open | Great Western Railway; Honeybourne Line | Gotherington; Line and station open |
