= Gloucestershire Warwickshire Railway =

Heritage railway in England

The Honeybourne Line
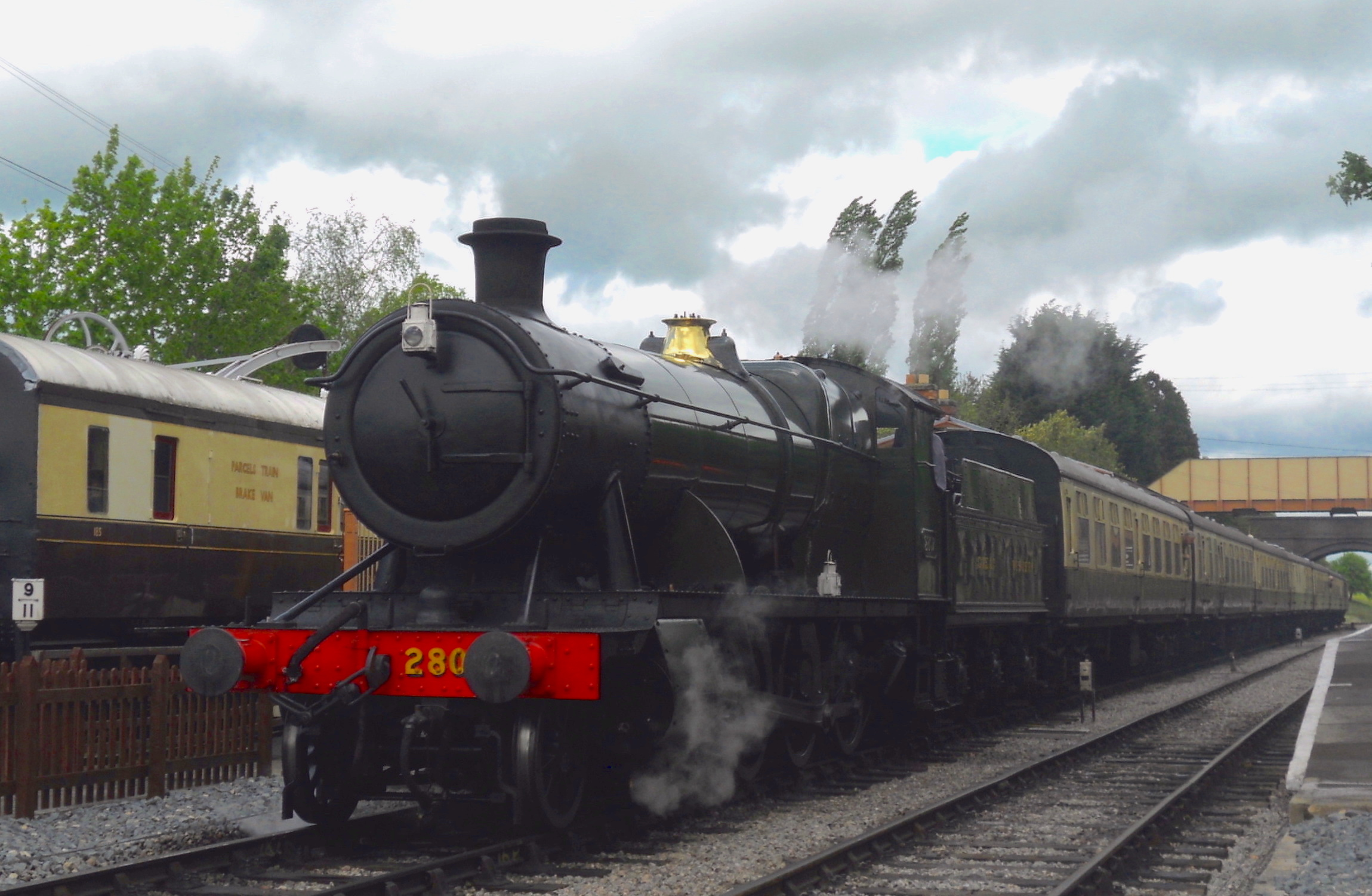
- GWR 2-8-0 28xx Class No. 2807 and its train are seen at Toddington
- Locale: Gloucestershire, Worcestershire England
- Terminus: Cheltenham Race Course and Broadway

Commercial operations
- Name: The Honeybourne Line
- Built by: Great Western Railway
- Original gauge: 4 ft 8 1/2 in (1,435 mm) standard gauge

Preserved operations
- Operated by: Gloucestershire Warwickshire Steam Railway Plc
- Stations: 6
- Length: 14 miles (23 km)
- Preserved gauge: 4 ft 8 1/2 in (1,435 mm) standard gauge

Commercial history
- Opened: 1906
- Closed: 1976

Preservation history
- 1981: Gloucestershire Warwickshire Steam Railway Plc formed and track re-laying began
- 1984: First public service along relaid section of track between Toddington Station and (the site of) Hayles Abbey Halt
- 1987: GWR Extended to Winchcombe
- 1990: GWR Extended to (the site of) Gretton halt
- 1997: Extended to Gotherington
- 2003: Extended to Cheltenham Race Course
- 2011: GWR extends to (the site of) Laverton halt
- 2017: Hayles Abbey Halt reopens
- 2018: Extended to Broadway
- Headquarters: Toddington, Gloucestershire

The Gloucestershire Warwickshire Steam Railway (GWR, GWSR or Gloucs-Warks Steam Railway) is a volunteer-run heritage railway which runs along the Gloucestershire/Worcestershire border of the Cotswolds in England.

The GWSR has restored and reopened around 14 miles (23 km) of track, operating between Cheltenham Race Course and Broadway. The most recent extension to Broadway (completed in 2018) involved the company raising £1.38 million. The 28-mile return trip on steam and heritage diesel trains follows part of the route of the former Great Western main line from Birmingham to Cheltenham. There is a long-term aim of extending a further 6 miles (9.7 km) from Broadway to the national rail network at Honeybourne.

== Overview ==
The line was originally part of the Great Western Railway's Cheltenham–Stratford-upon-Avon–Birmingham line, known as the Honeybourne Line, built in 1900–1906, and runs through the Cotswold towns of Winchcombe and Bishop's Cleeve. The line was run down over the years and finally closed after a derailment damaged a stretch of track in 1976, with the double track being lifted from 1979.

The preservation group rehabilitated the line, starting steam train operations at Toddington in 1984 over 700 yards (640 m) of re-laid track. In 1987, the line was restored as far as Winchcombe, where the station was reconstructed using the former Monmouth Troy station building. The railway continued to re-lay track west of Winchcombe, through the 693-yard (634 m) long Greet Tunnel, and past the villages of Gretton, Gotherington and Bishops Cleeve. The line to Cheltenham Race Course was re-opened by Princess Anne in 2003. The latest extension of the line, to Broadway, opened in March 2018.

The GWSR runs trains from March to the end of December, with the line closing during January and February as well as November for line and locomotive maintenance. The GWSR runs regular train services every weekend, plus most weekdays from Easter to the end of October, and some weekends are used to host special events including steam and diesel galas, Wartime in the Cotswolds, Real Ale Weekends and Santa Specials.

The railway operates a wide variety of both steam and heritage diesel locomotives, as well as heritage DMUs, and often hosts visiting locomotives during special events. In 2021, the resident steam locomotives on the line were 7820 "Dinmore Manor", 28xx class 2807 (undergoing 10-year overhaul), 42xx class 4270, 7903 "Foremarke Hall" and 35006 "Peninsular & Oriental SN Co". To complement the running stock, a collection of over 210 carriages and wagons of various origins has been compiled, many of which are still being restored.

The GWSR opened its extension to Broadway, Worcestershire to the public on 30 March 2018.

In December 2021 the railway returned to running a standard timetable after the removal of Coronavirus restrictions.

== Signalling of the Heritage GWSR ==
The route consists of single line sections with passing places at the major stations. All stations and loops are signalled using GWR lower quadrant semaphore signals.

The signalling on the line is a mixture of Electric Key Token (EKT) and One Train Staff working, depending on operational requirements. Current sections are:

- Broadway–Toddington (One Train Staff) - will be Track-circuit block (TCB) when Broadway box opens
- Toddington–Winchcombe (EKT)
- Winchcombe-Gotherington (EKT)
- Gotherington-Cheltenham Race Course (EKT)
- Winchcombe–Cheltenham Race Course (EKT) (With Gotherington switched out)
- Toddington–Cheltenham Race Course (One Train Staff - with Winchcombe and Gotherington switched out and Cheltenham Race Course behaving as a ground frame)

There are four signal boxes along the line, and a new-built platform-mounted one at Broadway, with the frame parts all acquired and assembled:

- Broadway – currently non-operational
- Toddington – operational
- Winchcombe – operational
- Gotherington – operational
- Cheltenham Race Course – operational

== Stations ==
Point	Coordinates (Links to map resources)	OS Grid Ref	Notes
Broadway	52.0429°N 1.8720°W	SP08873828	
Laverton Halt	52.0204°N 1.9047°W	SP06633577	Closed
Toddington	51.9891°N 1.9281°W	SP05033229	
Hayles Abbey Halt	51.9752°N 1.9331°W	SP04693075	
Winchcombe	51.9664°N 1.9634°W	SP02612976	
Gretton Halt	51.9726°N 1.9924°W	SP00613045	Closed
Gotherington	51.9672°N 2.0378°W	SO97492985	
Bishops Cleeve	51.9474°N 2.0504°W	SO96632765	Closed
Cheltenham Race Course	51.9240°N 2.0683°W	SO95392505	

== Future development plans ==
=== South to Cheltenham ===
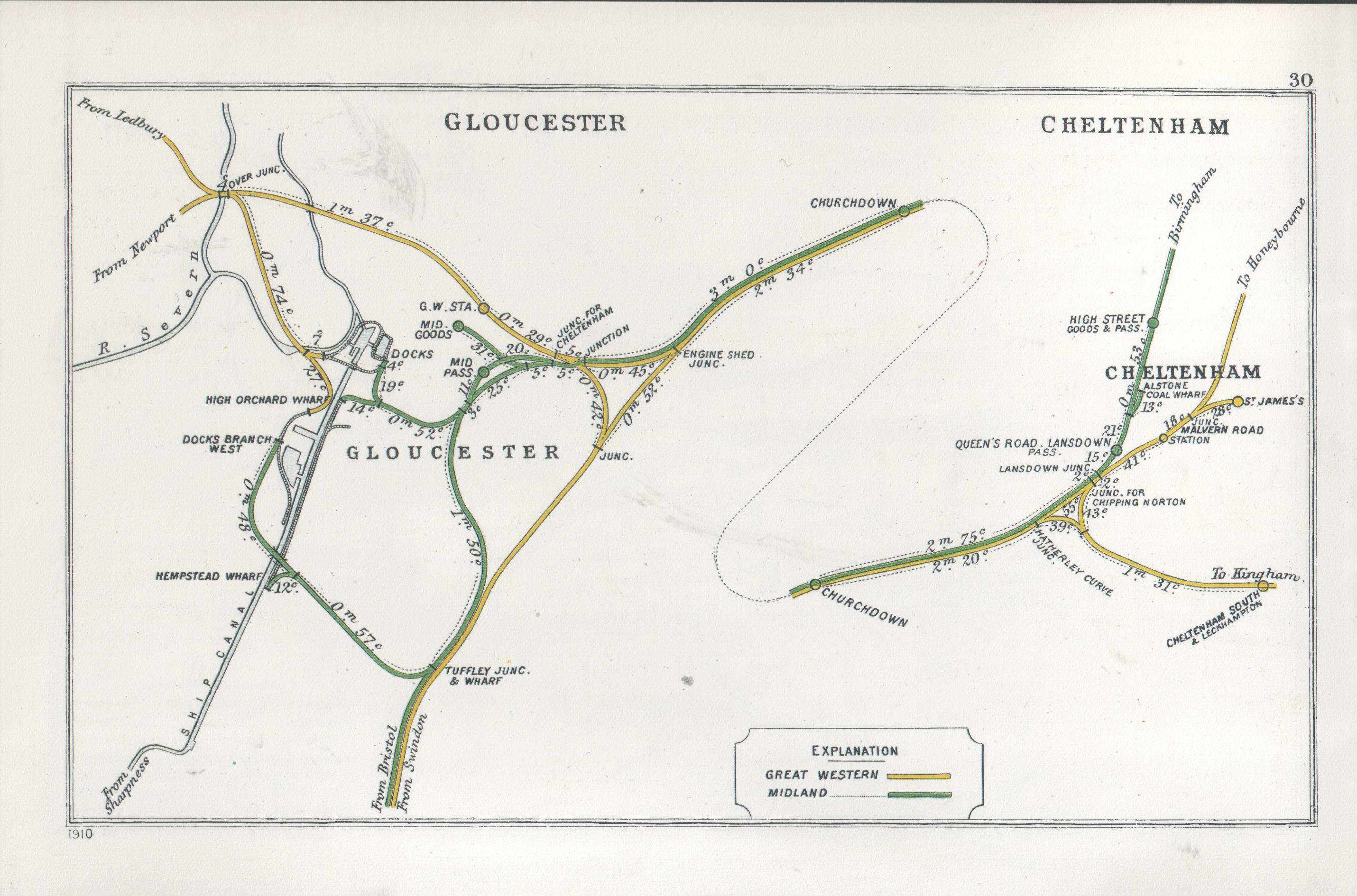
A 1910 Railway Clearing House map of railways in the vicinity of Gloucester and Cheltenham Spa

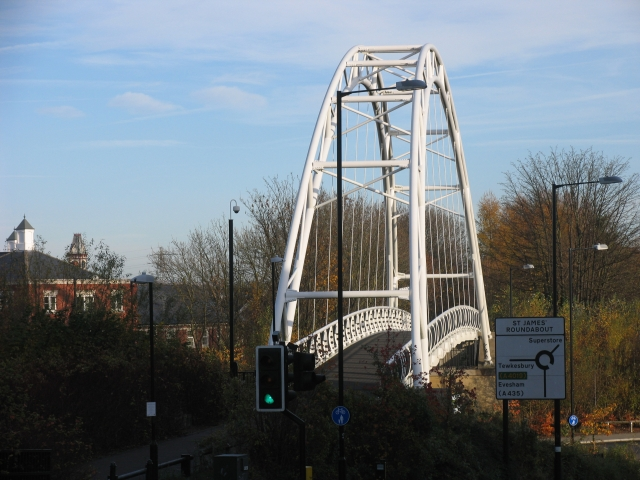
The bowstring bridge, built on the alignment of the former GWR trackbed into Cheltenham by developers in 2002 to allow continued bicycle access to Cheltenham Leisure Centre, when they constructed a supermarket on the site of the former Cheltenham Spa St. James station

Encouraged by support from Cheltenham Borough Council, which has both given the railway direct funds and placed protected status on the former line's trackbed south from Cheltenham Race Course to Cheltenham Spa, the railway could at some point connect to Network Rail in the south.

The council has backed the long-term scheme, as this would allow the railway to:

- be reinstated as an access point for race-goers from all over the UK to reach meetings at Cheltenham Racecourse, thus reduce current traffic congestion
- build a new halt in the Wyman's Brook area of Cheltenham itself, to serve an adjacent Prince of Wales sports stadium
- run tourist and excursion trains to access the railway and the town.

Although the GWSR has extended track to (and through) Hunting Butts tunnel, a few hundred yards beyond Cheltenham Race Course station, it owns the trackbed as far as the Prince of Wales stadium at Wyman's Brook. It is likely that after completion of its extension to Broadway, laying track further into Cheltenham will happen to this point; a distance of about 1 mile. However, beyond here major and costly engineering works would be required to extend the trackbed further south.

The primary impediments are firstly a bowstring bridge over Honeybourne Way (at 51.9024°N 2.0864°W), built in 2002 to allow continued access by bicycle along the old trackbed alignment to Cheltenham Leisure Centre when planning permission was given for the redevelopment of the former Cheltenham Spa St. James station site as a Waitrose supermarket; the bridge spans a gap in the former railway embankment which was created to provide road access to the supermarket. Secondly, a reduced-height pedestrian specification bridge carrying the footpath/railbed beneath the busy St Georges Road, which would have to be replaced to allow trains to pass beneath the road. There is space alongside the bowstring bridge for the railway, but there is no way to avoid the work necessary to get railway vehicles beneath St Georges Road.

An alternative connection to Network Rail close to Swindon Village was also discussed in 2018 in conjunction with developing Cheltenham Race Course station into a National Rail parkway railway station, although the proposal was not acknowledged in the subsequent Gloucestershire Local Transport Plan covering 2020–2041. The 2020 Gloucestershire Rail Strategy does advocate further assessment is made of a new Gloucestershire Parkway station but suggests a site on the existing Birmingham and Gloucester Railway close to M5 junction 11 would have the greatest benefit.

=== Between Broadway and Honeybourne ===
GWSR (Gloucestershire Warwickshire Railway) could buy the trackbed between Broadway and Honeybourne to protect it from future non-GWSR developments. The trackbed is 4.5 miles long, the bridges have not been removed or filled, and there are no plans to fill or remove them. However, they are in a very poor state and would cost a significant amount to restore; additionally, the DfT has indicated that it would not grant permission for the GWSR to purchase the trackbed and to take on liability for the bridges.

=== North from Honeybourne ===
When the GWSR was first formed, it intended to purchase the entire line from Cheltenham Racecourse to Stratford Racecourse. However, when applying for the required light railway order, the group were informed that they were unlikely to be granted the order for 25 miles when they had no experience of running a railway. A reduced application for the 15 miles from Cheltenham Race Course to Broadway was successful and track has since been laid and operations begun. Since this time, the section between Stratford and Stratford Racecourse has been utilised to improve road access around the town, especially the A4390, making reinstatement of rail to the main station at Stratford extremely difficult.

== Landslips ==
In the early 2010s the GWSR was affected by two major landslips in embankments on the line, which severed the preserved line into separate sections; however, both slips have now been repaired, and the whole line has been fully reopened. A further landslip occurred in November 2019 just south of Gotherington station, and again was repaired.

=== 2010 (Gotherington) ===
In April 2010 the GWSR suffered a landslip of an embankment near Gotherington. Train services continued despite the Gotherington landslip, but over a reduced route. The landslip forced the closure of the line south of Gotherington, including Cheltenham Race Course Station, which was effectively cut off. The railway continued to operate services from Toddington to Gotherington, with a locomotive at both ends of the train ("top and tailed"), as it was not possible to run the locomotive around the train at Gotherington at the time (there is now a run round loop just south of Gotherington). The railway launched a £1m appeal, both to fund the rebuilding of the embankment, and also to undertake preventative maintenance to ensure that similar problems do not happen at other points along the line. It was deemed unlikely that the line south of Gotherington would reopen before July 2011, but donations ensured that the work could be carried out promptly, and it was reopened on 22 April 2011.

=== 2011 (Chicken Curve) ===
In January 2011 the railway was damaged by another landslip just east of Winchcombe station at Chicken Curve. The landslip severed the railway in two; it was very similar to the one at Gotherington, but closer to the middle of the route. It was estimated that the cost of the repair work would be £850,000; funds for the repair were successfully raised. During the repair period a DMU service was run from Toddington up to the extension at Laverton; since the earlier Gotherington slip had been repaired, steam trains ran from Winchcombe to Cheltenham Race Course, the steam locomotive maintenance facilities temporarily being transferred to Winchcombe. The Chicken Curve landslip was repaired over the summer of 2012, and the GWSR was once again operational as a single unified line from Cheltenham Race Course to the site of Laverton Halt, a total of 12 route miles in length at that time.

=== 2019 (Gotherington) ===
Following extended heavy rain, one side of the embankment south of Gotherington station slipped. This was first discovered in November 2019, and worsened to the extent that no trains could run in January 2020. Following remedial works, the line reopened on 7 March 2020, in time for the regular Cheltenham race trains to run. Work is still ongoing to finish off the site. The total cost of repairs is expected to be £500,000; an emergency appeal has been issued to raise £250,000 towards this cost due to the closure of the line following the COVID-19 pandemic.

=== 2026 (Gotherington) ===
In February 2026, a further landslip occurred on the embankment between Gotherington and Bishop's Cleeve following prolonged rainfall. The railway introduced a temporary 5 mph speed restriction and operated a revised timetable while repair work was carried out.

== Steam locomotives ==
=== Operational ===
Number & Name	Description	Current Status	Livery	Image
2807	GWR 2-8-0 2800 Class	Built in 1905. Historically significant as the oldest locomotive rescued from Barry Scrapyard. Ten-year overhaul completed and new boiler ticket issued October 2023.	GWR unlined black	
3850	GWR 2-8-0 2884 Class	Withdrawn from traffic on 28 September 2015 and returned to service in August 2024. Owned by Dinmore Manor Locomotive Ltd.	GWR unlined black	
6880 "Betton Grange"	GWR 4-6-0 6800 "Grange" Class	Built in 2024. Newbuild member of the Grange class constructed between 1998 and 2024 by 6880 Betton Grange Society Ltd. Took up residence at the Gloucester and Warwickshire Railway in December 2024. Boiler Ticket expires in 2034.	BR Lined Green, Late Crest	
45110	LMS 4-6-0 LMS Black Five	Built in 1934. On six-month loan to the Gloucester and Warwickshire Railway courtesy of its owners West Coast Railways. Boiler Ticket expires in 2036.	BR Lined Black, Late Crest	

=== Undergoing restoration, repairs, overhaul, or construction ===
Number & Name	Description	Current Status	Livery	Image
2874	GWR 2-8-0 2800 Class	Major restoration has begun. Completed at Swindon in November 1918. Will be the only inside steam-pipe version operating when restored. Owned by 2874 Trust	N/A	
No. 7903 "Foremarke Hall"	GWR 4-6-0 6959 "Modified Hall" Class	Overhaul completed in mid-2016. Built in 1949. Boiler ticket expired in 2026. Withdrawn from service in November 2025 following the discovery of issues with the boiler during an inspection.	BR Green, Late Emblem	
35006 "Peninsular & Oriental S.N. Co."	SR 4-6-2 "Merchant Navy" Class	Returned to service in mid-2016 following the completion of a 30-year restoration from scrapyard condition. Built in 1941. Boiler ticket expired in 2025.	BR Green, Late Emblem	
76077	BR 2-6-0 Class 4MT	Undergoing major restoration. Built in 1956. Frames and wheels now off-site.	BR Black with late crest	

=== Stored or static ===
Number & Name	Description	Current Status	Livery	Image
7820 "Dinmore Manor"	GWR 4-6-0 7800 "Manor" Class	Built in 1950, owned by Dinmore Manor Locomotive Ltd. Boiler ticket expired in January 2025	BR Lined Black, Early Emblem	
John	Industrial Peckett & Sons limited, Bristol. W6 class 0-4-0ST. Works Number 1976.	The loco is presently undergoing cosmetic restoration in order to become a static exhibit at Toddington.		

== Diesel locomotives and DMUs ==
=== Operational ===
Number & Name	Description	Current Status	Livery	Image
D2182	BR 0-6-0DM Class 03	Operational	BR green with late crest	
11230	Drewry 0-6-0DM Class 04	Operational	BR black with early crest	
D2280	Drewry 0-6-0DM Class 04	Operational	Green	
D8137	BR Bo-Bo Class 20	Operational, returned to service for the first time in nearly 3 years in April 2022.	BR green with full yellow ends	
5081	BR Bo-Bo Class 24	Operational	BR blue with full yellow ends	
37215	BR Co-Co Class 37	Operational	BR blue with full yellow ends	
45149	BR 1 Co-Co 1 Class 45	Operational	BR blue with full yellow ends	
47105	BR Co-Co Class 47	Operational	BR blue with full yellow ends	
47376 "Freightliner 1995"	BR Co-Co Class 47	Operational	Freightliner grey	

=== Non operational ===
Number & Name	Description	Current Status	Livery	Image
372 "Des"	0-6-0 Yorkshire Engine Company	Withdrawn due to generator failure	Blue with wasp stripes	
20228	BR Bo-Bo Class 20	Undergoing restoration	BR blue with full yellow ends	
D5343	BR Bo-Bo Class 26	Undergoing overhaul	BR blue with full yellow ends	
D6948	BR Co-Co Class 37	Currently lifted to enable repairs to air system and traction equipment	Original BR green	
W55003	BR Class 122	Undergoing overhaul	New livery is yet to be chosen (was BR lined green with yellow warning panels)	
W51360	BR Class 117 DMBS	Awaiting restoration	BR blue	Moved from the Ecclesbourne Valley Railway in 2013
SC52029	BR Class 107 DMCL	Undergoing restoration	New livery will be BR Blue with full yellow end	

== Coaching stock ==
Operational coaches are shown in bold.

Origin	Type	Number	Livery	Notes	Image
BR	Mk 1 RBr,	**W1672**	Chocolate / Cream	Rake 1	
BR	Mk 1 RBr,	W1675	Chocolate / Cream	Stored pending overhaul. Some refurbishment has been done.	
BR	Mk 1 RMB,	**W1808**	Chocolate / Cream	Rake 3	
BR	Mk 1 RMB,	**M1876**	Maroon	Rake 2	
BR	Mk 1 RU,	1965	Olive Green	Ex Army. Long Term Storage	
BR	Mk 1 FO,	**W3132**	Chocolate / Cream	Rake 1 (named 'Mary' in honour of a long serving volunteer)	
BR	Mk 1 TSO	M3960	BR Blue / Grey	Stored pending overhaul	
BR	Mk 1 TSO	**M4614**	Maroon	Rake 2 (Modified for wheelchair use)	
BR	Mk 1 TSO	**W4763**	Chocolate / Cream	Rake 1	
BR	Mk 1 TSO	**W4772**	Chocolate / Cream	Rake 3	
BR	Mk 1 SO,	**M4787**	Maroon	Rake 2	
BR	Mk 1 SO	**W4790**,	Chocolate / Cream	Rake 1 (Modified for wheelchair use)	
BR	Mk 1 SO	**W4798**,	Chocolate / Cream	Rake 3	
BR	Mk 1 SO	M4806	Blue / Grey	S & T Store	
BR	Mk 1 TSO	M4867	Maroon	Stored pending overhaul	
BR	Mk 1 TSO,	IC4869	Inter City	Stored pending overhaul	
BR	Mk 1 TSO,	**W4986**	Chocolate / Cream	Rake 1	
BR	Mk 1 TSO,	**M5023**	Maroon	Rake 2	
BR	Mk 1 TSO,	**W5042**	Chocolate / Cream	Rake 1	
BR	Mk 1 BSOT,	**W9000**	Chocolate / Cream	Rake 1	
BR	Mk 1 FK,	**M13326**	Maroon	Rake 2	
BR	Mk 1 FK,	**W13329**	Chocolate / Cream	Rake 3	
BR	Mk 1 FK,	**W13337**	Chocolate / Cream	Rake 3	
BR	Mk 1 CK,	**M16195**	Maroon	Rake 2	
BR	Mk 1 CK,	SC16221	Blue / Grey	Under overhaul	
BR	Mk 1 BCK,	**W21092**	Chocolate / Cream	Spare	
BR	Mk 1 SK,	W24006	Red Oxide	Stored pending overhaul. Oldest extant Mk.1	
BR	Mk 1 SK,	**E24804**	Carmine / Cream	Spare (On loan from North Yorkshire Moors Railway)	
BR	Mk 1 SK,	**W24949**	Chocolate / Cream	Spare	
BR	Mk 1 SK,	**W25341**	Chocolate / Cream	Rake 3	
BR	Mk 1 SK,	**M25451**	Maroon	Rake 2	
BR	Mk 1 SK,	**E25488**	Carmine / Cream	Rake 1 (On loan from North Yorkshire Moors Railway)	
BR	Mk 1 SK,	M25501	Maroon	Stored pending overhaul	
BR	Mk 1 SK,	M25618	Maroon	Santa Coach	
BR	Mk 1 SK,	W25646	Chocolate / Cream	Loco Mess	
BR	Mk 1 SK,	W25743	Chocolate / Cream	Rake 3	
BR	Mk 1 BSK,	34701	Grey / Black	Ex IE Steam Heat Van	
BR	Mk 1 BSK	**E34929**	Maroon	Rake 3 (Modified for wheelchair use)	
BR	Mk 1 BSK	**M35308**	Maroon	Rake 2	
BR	Mk 1 POT,	80435			
BR	Mk 1 BG	W80893	Chocolate / Cream	Discovery Coach at Winchcombe	
BR	Mk 1 BG	S80926	BR Rail Blue and Pearl Grey		
BR	Mk 1 BG	**W81039**	Chocolate / Cream		
BR	Mk 1 BG	**M81049**	Maroon	P-Way Mess Coach	
BR	Mk 1 BG	81512			
BR	CCT,	94486, and 94557			
BR	GUV,	94051			

== See also ==
- North Gloucestershire Railway – a narrow gauge railway also at Toddington
- Stratford on Avon and Broadway Railway – a now defunct group that had initially hoped to restore the railway between Stratford upon Avon and Broadway.
