= Woodmancote, Dursley =

Village in Stroud District, Gloucestershire, England

Coordinates: 51°40′29″N 2°21′00″W

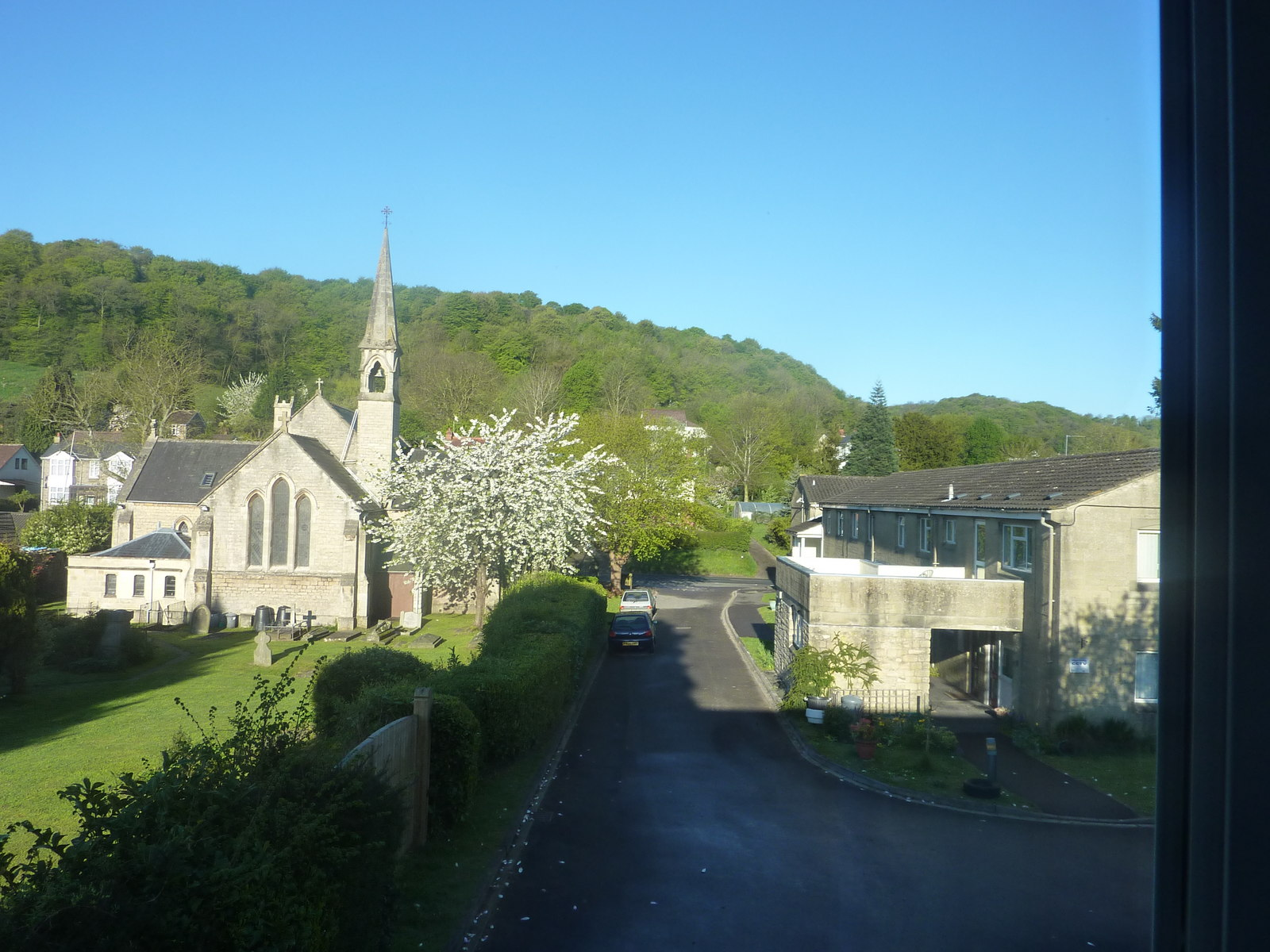
St Mark's Church, Vizard Close, Woodmancote

Woodmancote is a settlement which adjoins Dursley in Gloucestershire, England. St Mark's Church which is the locality closed for regular services in 2023. It is grade II listed building.
