= Cheltenham Race Course railway station =

Disused railway station in England

Coordinates: 51.92401°N 2.06833°W

Cheltenham Race Course
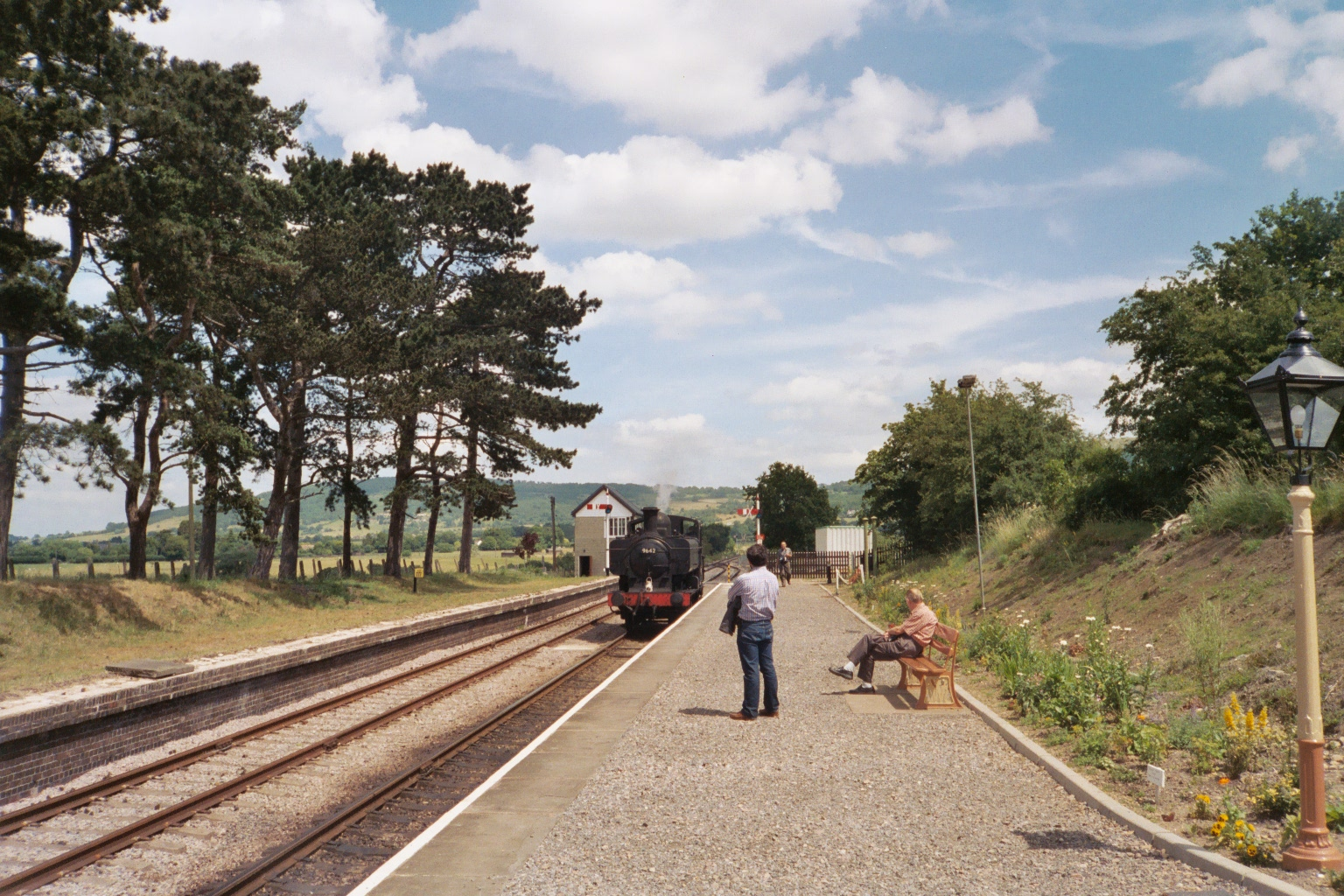

General information
- Location: Cheltenham, Cheltenham; England
- Grid reference: SO953250
- System: Station on heritage railway
- Owner: Gloucestershire Warwickshire Railway
- Operator: Gloucestershire Warwickshire Railway
- Platforms: 2

Key dates
- 13 March 1912: Opened as Cheltenham Racecourse
- 25 March 1968: Closed
- 16 March 1971: Re-opened
- 19 March 1976: Closed
- 7 April 2003: Re-opened in preservation
Location

Cheltenham Race Course railway station serves Cheltenham Racecourse on the outskirts of Cheltenham, Gloucestershire, England.

On the ex-Great Western Railway Cheltenham to Stratford line, the station opened in 1912 to serve the new racecourse at Prestbury Park, home of the famous Gold Cup meeting. The platforms were later extended to accommodate trains of up to 14 carriages. The station was only opened on race days and so facilities were rudimentary, but it continued to serve racegoers until the 1976 Cheltenham Festival.

Although most of the stations on the line closed in 1960, the line itself remained open for non-stop passenger services until 1968. Special trains on racedays only served Cheltenham Racecourse station from 1971 until 1976. The line was also used as a diversionary route with no scheduled passenger services until 1976, when a freight train derailed at Winchcombe and damaged the track. The line was officially closed in the same year; the track was lifted shortly afterward.

Cheltenham Race Course is now the southern terminus of the 14-mile-long heritage Gloucestershire Warwickshire Railway, run entirely by volunteers. The line has been reopened in stages. The line trackbed itself was bought in 1984. The track from Gotherington to the racecourse was relaid in 2001. The line was reopened as a heritage railway by the Princess Royal on 7 April 2003.

The station is in a cutting fringed by Corsican pine trees. Its northern end, where it emerges from the cutting, affords views towards Cleeve Hill. The original station booking office is believed to be the only remaining example of a Swindon-built flatpack prefabricated building that was brought by train and assembled on site. It is perched at the top of the cutting, next to the A435 roadbridge and close to the main entrance of the racecourse. It has a collection of artefacts housed within it. A gentle slope gives access to the platform where there is a new station building with a canopy, toilets and waiting room. The station has two tracks, one adjacent to the platform and the other to allow locomotives to run around the train. A new signal box was opened in 2005 to control the signals and point work around the station.

Access to the station by car is only via the main racecourse entrance. There is a large free car park. A bus service runs from the Network Rail Cheltenham Spa station, through the town centre to the Racecourse Park and Ride, about 10 minutes' walk from the Gloucestershire Warwickshire Steam Railway station.

== Platform 2 reconstruction ==
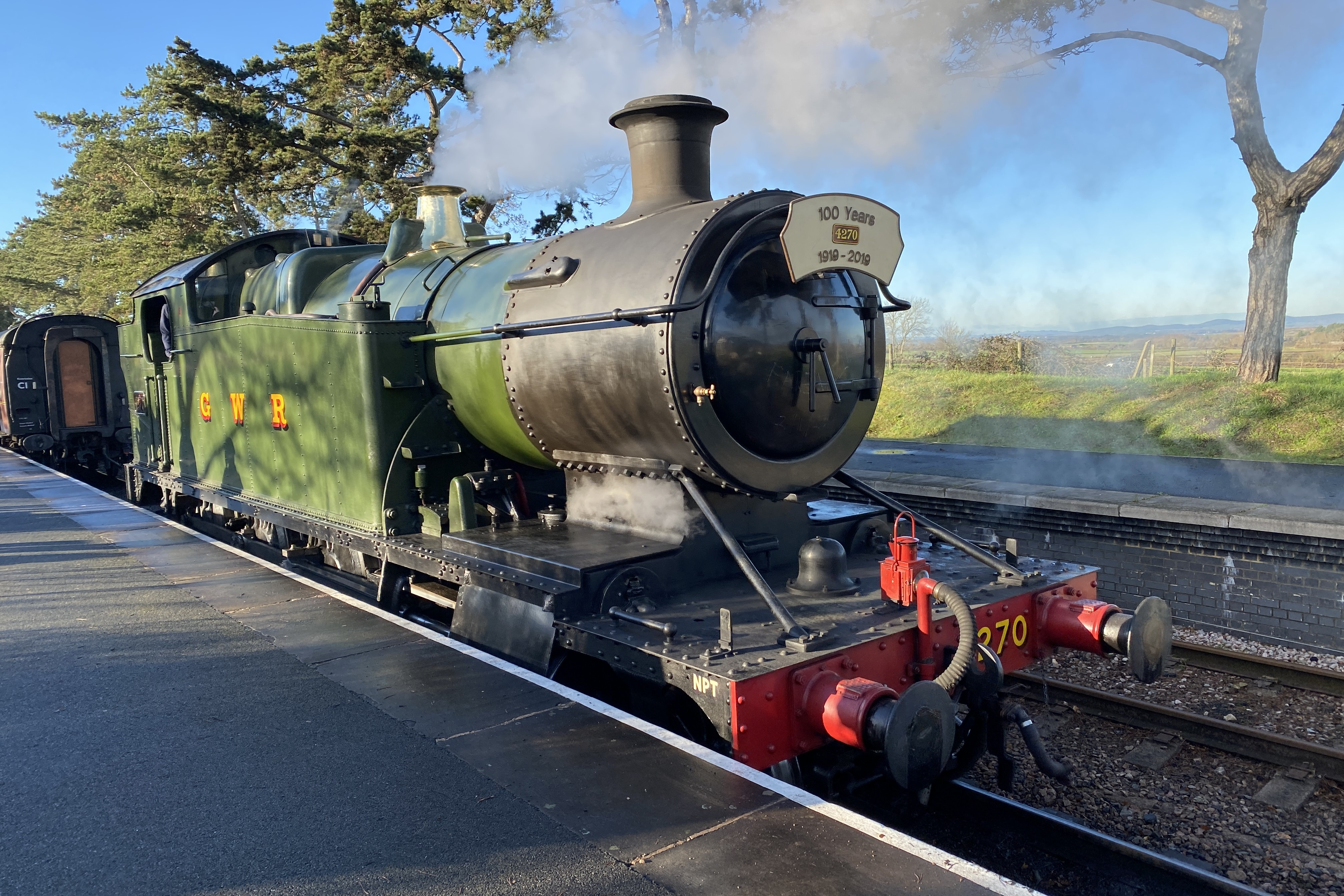
GWR 4200 Class 4270 at Cheltenham in January 2023.

In 2012, as part of a new Development Foundation, the GWSR launched an appeal to reconstruct Platform 2 at Cheltenham Race Course station. Reconstruction of Platform 2 was completed in 2016.

Preceding station	Heritage railways	Following station
Terminus	Gloucestershire Warwickshire Railway	Gotherington towards Broadway
Proposed extension
Cheltenham Spa Malvern Road towards Cheltenham Spa	Gloucestershire Warwickshire Railway	Gotherington towards Broadway
Historical railways
Cheltenham High Street Halt; Line and station closed	Great Western Railway; Honeybourne Line	Bishop's Cleeve; Line open, station closed
