= Chambers Crossing Halt railway station =

Former railway station in England

Coordinates: 52.1685°N 1.7461°W

Chambers Crossing Halt
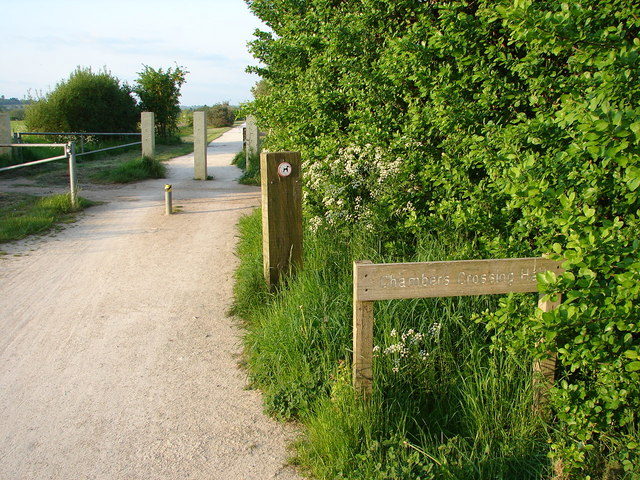
- Station site in 2008.

General information
- Location: nr. Luddington, Stratford-on-Avon; England
- Platforms: 2

Other information
- Status: Disused

History
- Original company: Great Western Railway

Key dates
- 17 October 1904: Opened
- 14 July 1916: Closed
Location

Chambers Crossing Halt railway station was a timber-framed railway halt on the Stratford-upon-Avon to Cheltenham section of the Honeybourne Line. The station was located two miles south-west of Stratford upon Avon. The site of the station is now part of the Stratford greenway and may in future form part of the Gloucestershire Warwickshire Railway's northern extension from Toddington.

== History ==
The section of the Honeybourne Line from Stratford-upon-Avon to Honeybourne was opened by the Oxford, Worcester and Wolverhampton Railway on 9 July 1859, but it was over forty years before Chambers Crossing Halt was opened on 17 October 1904 by the Great Western Railway. A single platform was built to the south of the level crossing over a lane which ran from Weston-on-Avon to Clifford Chambers. A crossing keeper's cottage had been built here in around 1899 and by the time the halt opened, the crossing was gated and protected by signals. The gates were operated by a ground frame on the west side of the line to the north of the crossing. When the line was doubled in 1908, the frame was relocated to the opposite site of the crossing, adjacent to the keeper's cottage. A second platform was added on the Up side around this time at a cost of £75 (equivalent to £10,000 in 2023). The platforms, each of which was 100 ft (30 m) for the steam railmotor service, had no passenger facilities, only lamps and the running in boards.

The timetable for April 1910 shows that Chambers Crossing Halt was served by seven railmotors in each direction between Honeybourne and Cheltenham, with some running to and from Evesham. An additional service ran from Honeybourne to Broadway and back. Due to low patronage and the outbreak of the First World War, the station, along with two other halts opened on the same date (Evesham Road Crossing Halt and Broad Marston Halt) closed on 17 July 1916 as a wartime economy measure. It is thought unlikely that there are any photographs of the station in existence due to its short lifetime and its unremarkable appearance.

Freight services continued to pass through the station until November 1976 when the line itself was closed. The tracks between the current Stratford station and Honeybourne were taken up in 1979.

Preceding station	Disused railways	Following station
Milcote; Line and station closed	Great Western Railway; Honeybourne Line	Stratford-upon-Avon; Racecourse Platform; Line and station closed

== Present day ==
The trackbed between Stratford-upon-Avon Racecourse Platform and Long Marston lay disused for ten years until 1989 when, in a joint venture between Sustrans and Warwickshire County Council, it was made into the 5 mi (8.0 km) Stratford Greenway for cycling and walking. The crossing cottage survives as a private residence.

The long-term aspiration of the Gloucestershire Warwickshire Railway, a heritage railway formed in 1976 to keep the Honeybourne Line open, is to reopen the line as far as Stratford from its base at Toddington.

== Sources ==
- Baker, Audie (1994). The Stratford on Avon to Cheltenham Railway. Grasscroft, Oldham: Irwell Press. ISBN 978-1-871608-62-5.
- Butt, R. V. J. (October 1995). The Directory of Railway Stations: details every public and private passenger station, halt, platform and stopping place, past and present (1st ed.). Sparkford: Patrick Stephens Ltd. ISBN 978-1-85260-508-7. OCLC 60251199. OL 11956311M.
- Clinker, C. R. (October 1978). Clinker's Register of Closed Passenger Stations and Goods Depots in England, Scotland and Wales 1830–1977. Bristol: Avon-Anglia Publications & Services. ISBN 0-905466-19-5. OCLC 5726624.
- Kingscott, Geoffrey (2009). Lost Railways of Warwickshire. Newbury, Berkshire: Countryside Books. ISBN 978-1-84674-174-6.
- Maggs, Colin G.; Nicholson, Peter (1985). The Honeybourne Line: The continuing story of the Cheltenham to Honeybourne and Stratford upon Avon Railway. Cheltenham, Glos.: Line One Publishing. ISBN 978-0-907036-12-8.
