= Clifford Chambers and Milcote =

Civil parish in Warwickshire, England

Coordinates: 52.165°N 1.738°W

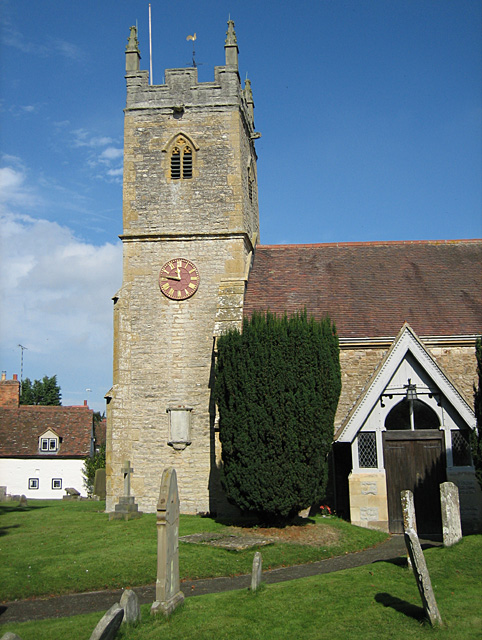
- Clifford Chambers Church

- Location within Warwickshire
- Population: 432 (2011 census)
- Civil parish: Clifford Chambers and Milcote
- District: Stratford-on-Avon
- Shire county: Warwickshire
- Region: West Midlands
- Country: England
- Sovereign state: United Kingdom
- Police: Warwickshire
- Fire: Warwickshire
- Ambulance: West Midlands

Clifford Chambers and Milcote is a civil parish in the Stratford-on-Avon District, in the county of Warwickshire, England, formed on 1 April 2004. It is made up of the two villages of Clifford Chambers and Milcote. The Honeybourne railway line used to run through the parish and there were two stations, which are Chambers Crossing Halt and Milcote. It had a population of 432 at the 2011 census.
