= Stratford station (disambiguation) =

Stratford station is an interchange station in Stratford, East London, England, UK.

Stratford station may also refer to:

- Stratford railway station, Victoria, Australia
- Stratford station (Ontario), Canada
- Stratford railway station, New Zealand
- Stratford station (Connecticut), United States
- Stratford Station Apartments, a residential colony at Centennial, Colorado, United States

== See also ==
- Stratford International station, an intermodal station in East London, England
- Stratford High Street DLR station, a light rail station in East London, England
- Stratford Old Town railway station, a former railway station in Warwickshire, England
- Stratford-upon-Avon railway station, a railway station in Warwickshire, England
- Stratford-upon-Avon Parkway railway station, a railway station in Warwickshire, England
- Stratford-upon-Avon Racecourse Platform railway station, a former railway station in Warwickshire, England
