= Stratford-upon-Avon Racecourse Platform railway station =

Former railway station in England

Coordinates: 52.1840°N 1.7149°W

Stratford-upon-Avon Racecourse Platform

General information
- Location: Stratford-upon-Avon, Stratford-on-Avon; England
- Platforms: 2

Other information
- Status: Disused

History
- Post-grouping: Great Western Railway; Western Region of British Railways

Key dates
- 6 May 1933: Opened as Stratford-on-Avon Racecourse Platform
- 18 June 1951: Renamed
- 25 March 1968: Closed
Location

Stratford-upon-Avon Racecourse Platform was a railway station on the Stratford upon Avon to Cheltenham section of the Honeybourne Line. Located one mile (1.6 km) south of the town centre, its purpose was to serve Stratford Racecourse. It closed in 1968 as a result of falling passenger numbers.

The site of the station has now long been a part of the Stratford-upon-Avon greenway, however the site (which once served the racecourse) may one day in future become the northern terminus of the preserved Gloucestershire Warwickshire Railway, which aims to eventually extend north-eastwards to Stratford-upon-Avon.

== History ==
On 9 July 1859, the Oxford, Worcester and Wolverhampton Railway opened a line from Stratford-upon-Avon to Honeybourne. The OW&W became the West Midland Railway in 1860 and was acquired by Great Western Railway in 1883 with a view to combining it with the Birmingham to Stratford Line to create a high-speed route from the Midlands to the South West. The GWR obtained authorisation in 1899 for the construction of a double-track line between Honeybourne and Cheltenham and this was completed in stages by 1908.

The Racecourse station was opened on 6 May 1933, one of two railway halts added to the line during its 1930s heyday (the other being Pebworth Halt). Built to serve Stratford Racecourse, the station was originally known as Stratford-on-Avon Racecourse Platform and later renamed in 1951 to change the "on-Avon" to "upon-Avon". As it was assumed that most passengers would be coming for the races, only very basic facilities were provided. These consisted of two 550 ft (170 m) platforms constructed of sleepers supported by Barlow rail. There were no toilet facilities, passenger shelters or booking office. A separate board, which hung below the running in board, informed racegoers of the date of the next race meeting. Near the north end of the platforms was a bridge which carried the Stratford-upon-Avon and Midland Junction Railway (SMJR) over the Honeybourne Line.

This section of the SMJR was to close on 13 June 1960 following the opening of a new east-facing curve connecting the SMJR with the Honeybourne Line. The curve opened on 24 April 1960 creating a junction which became known as Racecourse Junction and which led directly to Stratford-upon-Avon (Old Town) station. The purpose of the link was to facilitate the running of ironstone traffic from Banbury to South Wales (which had previously gone via Leamington Spa, Hatton and Bearley and also to enable the closure of the line between Stratford and Broom Junction. In the event, the traffic only lasted a short while, and with the cessation of Ironstone extraction at Wroxton, near Banbury, the curve closed on 5 July 1965.

Due to increased motor vehicle usage, the number of passengers using the Racecourse station decreased and it was closed on 25 March 1968 following the withdrawal of the twice-daily DMU which ran between Gloucester and Leamington Spa. Freight services continued to pass through the station until 1 November 1976 when the line itself was closed. The tracks between the current Stratford station and Honeybourne station were taken up in 1979.

Disused railways
Honeybourne; Line closed, station open	Western Region of British Railways; Honeybourne Line	Stratford-upon-Avon; Line closed, station open
Chambers Crossing Halt; Line and station closed	Great Western Railway; Honeybourne Line	Stratford-upon-Avon; Line closed, station open
Preceding station	Heritage railways	Following station
Proposed extension
Milcote towards Cheltenham Race Course	Gloucestershire Warwickshire Railway	Stratford-upon-Avon Terminus

== Present day ==
The trackbed between Stratford Racecourse and Long Marston lay disused for ten years until 1989 when, in a joint venture between Sustrans and Warwickshire County Council, it was made into the 5 mi (8.0 km) Stratford Greenway for cycling and walking. At the site of the Racecourse station, which is at the northernmost point of the greenway, two reconditioned Mark 1 1957 carriages stand. One is used as a bicycle hire centre and the other as a café. In the future, the station may become the northern terminus of the Gloucestershire Warwickshire Railway.

To the north of the station, ⅓-mile of the trackbed has since been reused as part of the A4390 Stratford Inner Relief Road (Seven Meadows Road); this follows the alignment of the Honeybourne Line from the site of the former SMJR overbridge at Alcester Road to the Evesham Place roundabout to the south of Stratford station. The scheme to build the road generated hundreds of objections and a lengthy public enquiry. The road scheme saw the SMJR bridge replaced by a large roundabout.

A 1996 study commissioned by Warwickshire County Council and Stratford-on-Avon District Council concluded that reinstatement to Stratford station is still feasible, but would require the re-modelling of Evesham Place roundabout and replacement of the cycleway alongside Seven Meadows Road and the footpath between Sandifield Road and Evesham Place to be converted into railway. Reaccommodating the railway would be at a significant financial cost and the report concluded that there was only a case for establishing a tourist/heritage service between Stratford Racecourse and Honeybourne. The current position of the County Council is that it is unable to support proposals to reinstate the line as far as Stratford station due to concerns over the likely impact on Seven Meadows Road and the roundabout and the proximity of the rerouted line to residential housing.

== Sources ==
- Baker, Audie (1994). The Stratford on Avon to Cheltenham Railway. Grasscroft, Oldham: Irwell Press. ISBN 978-1-871608-62-5.
- Boynton, John (1994). Shakespeare's Railways. Kidderminster, Worcs: Mid England Books. ISBN 978-0-9522248-1-5.
- Butt, R. V. J. (October 1995). The Directory of Railway Stations: details every public and private passenger station, halt, platform and stopping place, past and present (1st ed.). Sparkford: Patrick Stephens Ltd. ISBN 978-1-85260-508-7. OCLC 60251199. OL 11956311M.
- Croughton, Godfrey; Kidner, R. W.; Young, Alan (1982). Private and Untimetabled Railway Stations: Halts and Stopping Places. Trowbridge, Wilts.: The Oakwood Press. ISBN 0-85361-281-1.
- Kingscott, Geoffrey (2009). Lost Railways of Warwickshire. Newbury, Berkshire: Countryside Books. ISBN 978-1-84674-174-6.
- Maggs, Colin G.; Nicholson, Peter (1985). The Honeybourne Line: The continuing story of the Cheltenham to Honeybourne and Stratford upon Avon Railway. Cheltenham, Glos.: Line One Publishing. ISBN 978-0-907036-12-8.
- Mitchell, Victor E.; Smith, Keith (August 2005) [1998]. Stratford upon Avon to Cheltenham. Country Railway Routes. Midhurst: Middleton Press. ISBN 1-901706-25-7.
- Oppitz, Leslie (2004) [2002]. Lost Railways of Herefordshire & Worcestershire. Newbury, Berkshire: Countryside Books. ISBN 978-1-85306-754-9.
- Yorke, Stan (2009). Lost Railways of Gloucestershire. Newbury, Berkshire: Countryside Books. ISBN 978-1-84674-163-0.
