= Milcote railway station =

Former railway station in England

Milcote
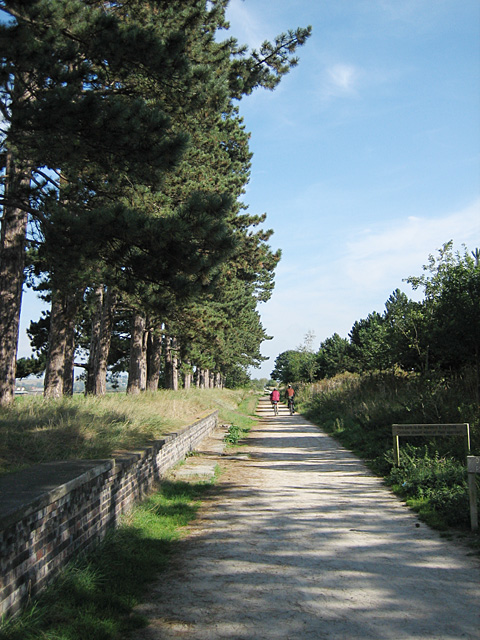
- The station site in 2005, showing the remains of the up platform. The trees are 97 years old.

General information
- Location: Milcote, Stratford-on-Avon; England
- Coordinates: 52.1620°N 1.7522°W
- Grid reference: SP170515
- Platforms: 2 (from 1908; previously 1)

Other information
- Status: Disused

History
- Original company: Oxford, Worcester and Wolverhampton Railway
- Pre-grouping: Great Western Railway
- Post-grouping: Great Western Railway; Western Region of British Railways

Key dates
- 12 July 1859: First station opened
- May 1908: 1st station closed; 2nd station opened
- 3 January 1966: Station closed
Location

Milcote railway station was a station on the Great Western Railway line between Stratford-upon-Avon and Honeybourne, which in 1908 became part of the Great Western Railway's new main line between Birmingham and Cheltenham.

The station's site, in the far south-western corner of Milcote parish and about 3 miles (5 km) south-west of the GWR station in Stratford, was dictated by the fact that this was the first point south of the River Avon at which the line crossed a public road. This was, and is, a very lightly populated district, and at the time of the station's opening there was scarcely another building in sight. Most of Milcote's passenger traffic must have been expected to be to or from the nearby villages of Weston on Avon and Welford on Avon. The station's nameboards at the time of its eventual closure read "Milcote for Weston and Welford".

== History ==
The first Milcote station was opened on 12 July 1859 by the Oxford, Worcester and Wolverhampton Railway as one of two intermediate stations on the branch, the other being at Long Marston. It consisted of a station building, a single passenger platform, and two goods sidings, all on the south side of the road linking Weston and Clifford Chambers, which crossed the line here via a level crossing. A signal box was added in 1891–92: previously the station's signals and points appear to have been operated from a frame either on the platform itself or inside the main station building. In 1908 the Great Western Railway doubled the line between Stratford and Honeybourne as part of its new through route between Birmingham and Cheltenham via Stratford, and a new two-platformed station was built on the north side of the crossing. The original building, with its station master's house, was retained.

5,077 passengers were recorded in 1903. Annual totals increased to 7,126 in 1913 and 9,399 in 1923, but fell to 5,151 in 1933. The increase in motor vehicle use led to passengers numbers at this rather isolated station decreasing still further after World War II. In 1956 British Railways reduced its status to that of an unstaffed halt. BR withdrew goods facilities from July 1963 and the station was closed to passenger traffic from January 1966. Trains continued to pass through the closed station until November 1976 when the line itself was closed. The tracks between Stratford and Long Marston were removed in 1979.

== Greenway ==
The trackbed was disused for ten years until 1989 when, in a joint venture between Sustrans and Warwickshire County Council, it was converted to a greenway for cycling and walking.

Disused railways
Long Marston; Line and station closed	Great Western Railway; Honeybourne Line	Chambers Crossing Halt; Line and station closed
Preceding station	Heritage railways	Following station
Proposed extension
Long Marston towards Cheltenham Race Course	Gloucestershire Warwickshire Railway	Stratford-upon-Avon Racecourse Platform towards Stratford-upon-Avon
