= Willersey =

Village in Gloucestershire, England

Coordinates: 52.05°N 1.847°W

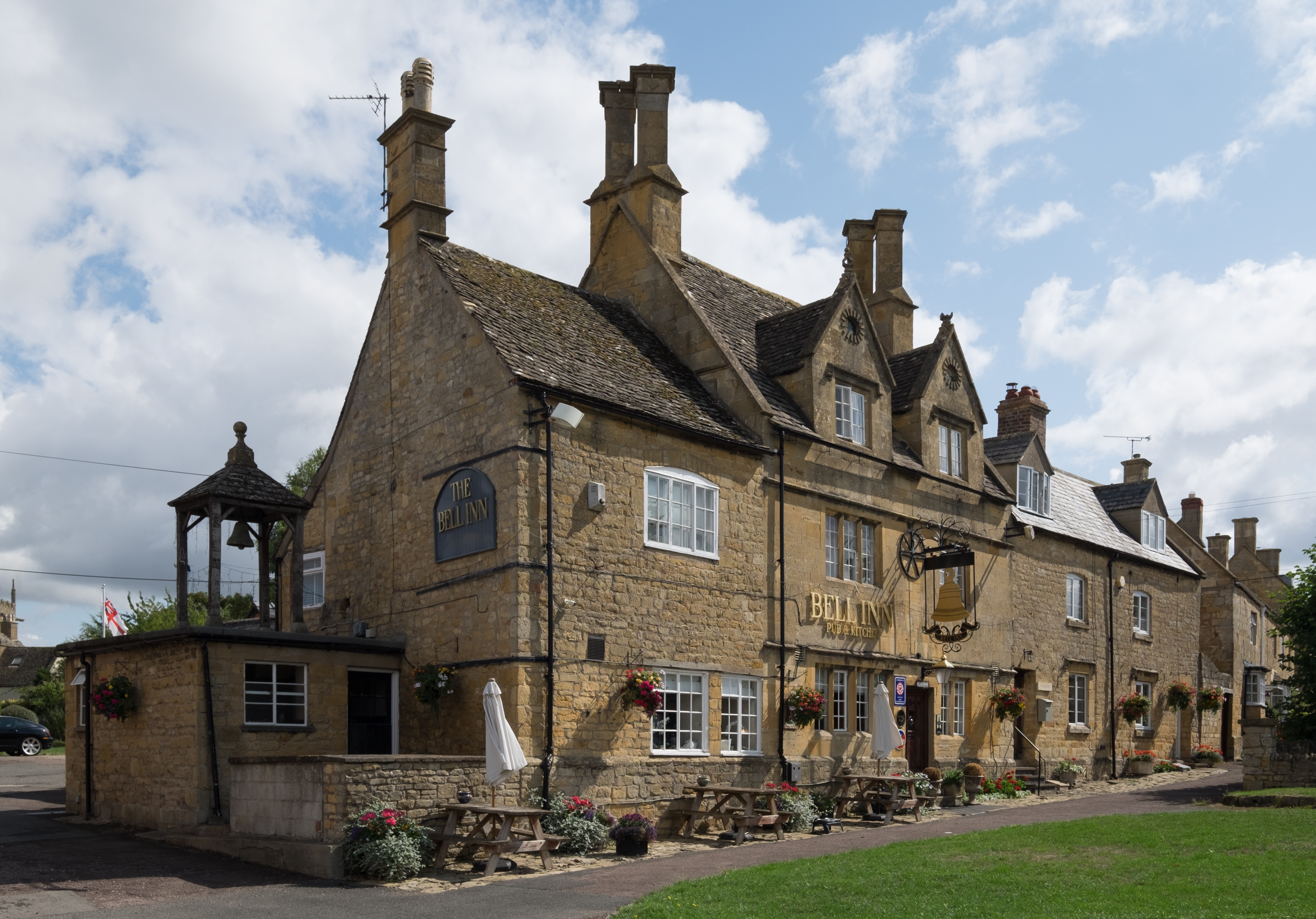
- The Bell Inn, Willersey

- Location within Gloucestershire
- Population: 816 (2011 Census)
- OS grid reference: SP104398
- Civil parish: Willersey
- District: Cotswold
- Shire county: Gloucestershire
- Region: South West
- Country: England
- Sovereign state: United Kingdom
- Post town: BROADWAY
- Postcode district: WR12
- Dialling code: 01386
- Police: Gloucestershire
- Fire: Gloucestershire
- Ambulance: South Western
- UK Parliament: North Cotswolds

Willersey is a village in Gloucestershire, South West England, situated close to the boundary with Worcestershire, West Midlands region, and 5 miles (8 km) southwest of Evesham. Although situated in Gloucestershire, the postal county for the village is Worcestershire, as it is covered by the Broadway post town. It is an old village with much character. There is a primary school and a park.

The Church of St Peter was built in the 12th century. It is a grade I listed building.

== Archaeology ==
In 2023, two cavalry swords were found by a metal detectorist in a field near the village. Excavations in 2025 indicated that there had been an Iron Age settlement at the site, and then a Roman villa.

== Transport ==
Between 1904 and 1960, Willersey was served by a halt on the Honeybourne Line.

Today Willersey is served by three bus routes each operated by a different bus company. Willersey to Evesham, known as Rural 4 is operated by N.N. Cresswell Coach Hire Ltd. Prior to Autumn 2013 the Willersey to Evesham was operated by Castleways Coaches. The Willersey to Cheltenham route is operated by Castleways Coaches. The third route is Moreton-in-Marsh to Stratford-upon-Avon which is operated by Johnsons buses.

The nearest railway station to Willersey is Honeybourne which is served by the Cotswold line, offering a direct journey to London Paddington. However Honeybourne station is unreachable by public transport so travellers can go by bus to Moreton-in-Marsh or Evesham to catch a train on the same line.

== Industry ==
Willersey attracts fewer tourists than many Cotswold villages. It is an industrial and farming village. It has an industrial estate and Auto-Sleepers, a motorhome manufacturer, and Vale Press, a printing company, are based there. Heming Services are also based just outside the village.

== Pubs ==
There are two pubs in the village – The Bell Inn and The New Inn. The Bell Inn is a 17th-century Cotswold stone building. Its sign is a depiction of a large bell and the pub has a wooden bell tower. The New Inn is toward the top of Main Street near the old village shop.
