= Laverton Halt railway station =

Former railway station in Gloucestershire, England

Coordinates: 52.02039°N 1.90467°W

Laverton Halt
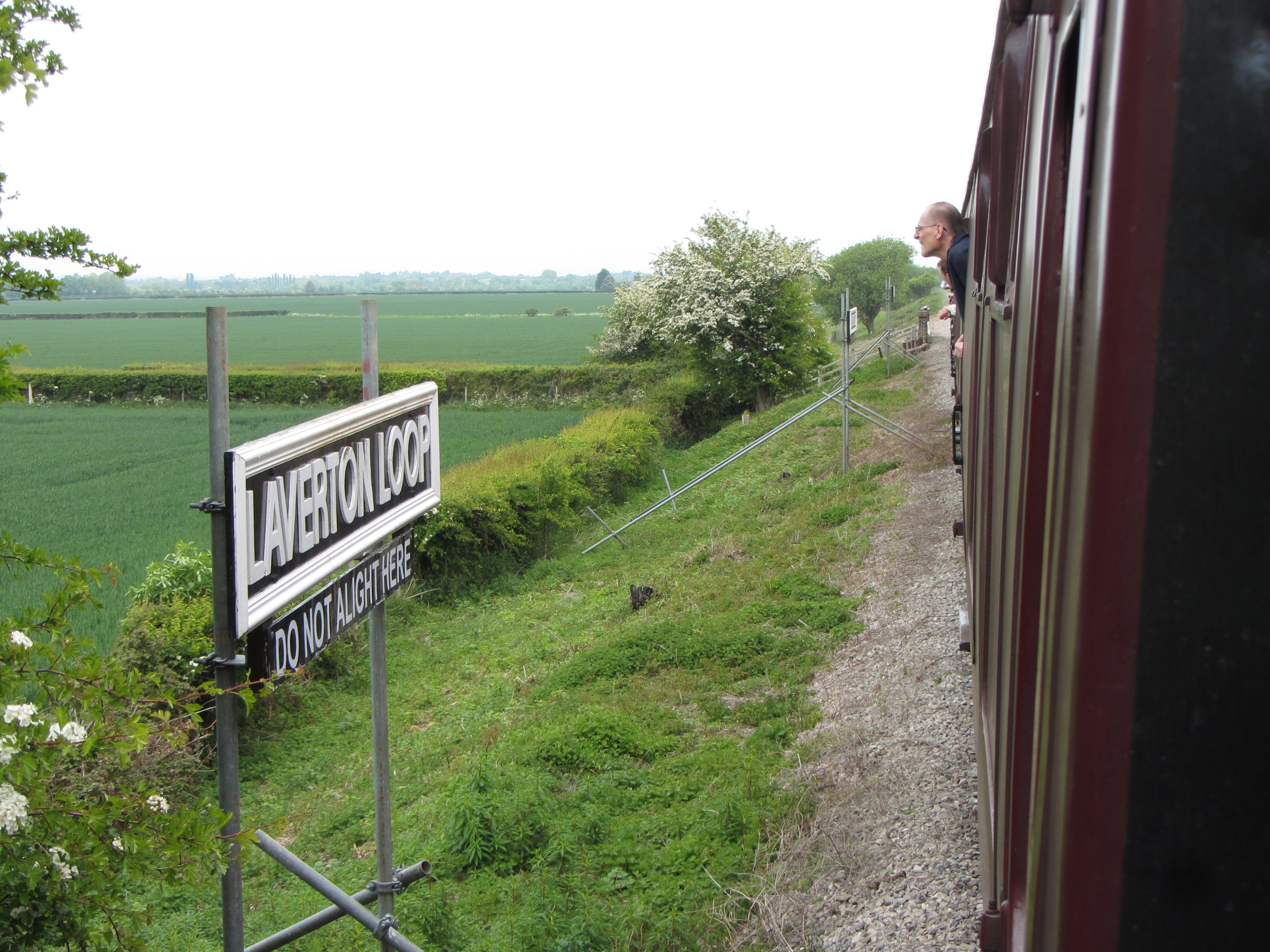
- Station site in 2015

General information
- Location: Laverton, Tewkesbury; England
- Platforms: 2

Other information
- Status: Disused

History
- Original company: Great Western Railway
- Post-grouping: Great Western Railway; Western Region of British Railways

Key dates
- 14 August 1905: Opened
- 7 March 1960: Closed
Location

Laverton Halt railway station was a halt on the Honeybourne Line from Honeybourne to Cheltenham which served the hamlet of Laverton in Gloucestershire between 1905 and 1960.

The line through the site of the now-demolished station, lifted after the route's full closure in 1976, has been relaid by the Gloucestershire Warwickshire Steam Railway, with the first service to the site running on 30 March 2011. Whilst the station has not been rebuilt, a run-round was constructed at the site, which has now been removed ready for the extension to Broadway station which opened in 2018.

== History ==
On 9 July 1859, the Oxford, Worcester and Wolverhampton Railway opened a line from Stratford-upon-Avon to Honeybourne. The OW&W became the West Midland Railway in 1860 and was acquired by Great Western Railway in 1883 with a view to combining it with the Birmingham to Stratford Line to create a high-speed route from the Midlands to the South West. The GWR obtained authorisation in 1899 for the construction of a double-track line between Honeybourne and Cheltenham and this was completed in stages by 1908.

Laverton Halt was opened on 14 August 1905. It was situated half a mile from the village of Laverton, from which it was separated by what is now the B4632 road. As well as Laverton, the halt served the villages of Buckland, Wormington and Stanton. To the south of Laverton Halt is Stanway Viaduct, a viaduct comprising 15 arches, each of which is 15 ft (4.6 m) in width and 46 ft (14 m) in height constructed of Staffordshire blue brick.

The station was a simple rail motor halt constructed of timber, much like other halts on the line. The two wooden trellis platforms had no passenger facilities beyond a small pagoda hut on each platform. The 100 ft (30 m) platforms cost £235 (equivalent to £24,700 in 2025) and were extended in November 1906 to 158 ft (48 m) at a cost of £29 (equivalent to £3,000 in 2025). A footpath from the road was constructed in 1909 at a cost of £54 (equivalent to £5,700 in 2025).

At first, Laverton was supervised by the stationmaster at Toddington, but it later came under the control of Broadway. A timetable from August 1906 shows that Laverton Halt was served by seven services each way between Honeybourne and Cheltenham, with trains calling there 6 minutes after leaving Broadway in the Down direction and 7 minutes after leaving Toddington in the Up direction. By 1932, the service was supplemented by three trains each way between Cheltenham and Broadway, and one to Winchcombe and back. The station was used by many schoolchildren who used it to travel to Cheltenham. It closed on 7 March 1960, the same day on which the local passenger service was withdrawn from the Honeybourne Line.

== Present and future ==
The underbridge to the north of the station was removed in August 1988 to allow tall machinery to access the British Gas facility at Laverton. It was finally replaced in December 2009 by a bridge which provided the same headroom as the previous one. The cost of the new bridge was met by National Grid which now operates the gas facility.

The Heritage Gloucestershire Warwickshire Railway, which is currently in the process of reopening a major section of the Honeybourne to Cheltenham line to Broadway, ran the first train to the site of Laverton Halt on 30 March 2011. The halt has not been reinstated, although a run-round loop was constructed at the site. This loop was first used on 9 March 2013, and removed by May 2016 for reuse at Broadway station.

Preceding station	Heritage railways	Following station
Proposed service
Toddington towards Cheltenham Race Course	Gloucestershire Warwickshire Railway	Broadway Terminus
Historical railways
Toddington; Line open, station open	Great Western Railway; Honeybourne Line	Broadway; Line open, station open

== Sources ==
- Baker, Audie (1994). The Stratford on Avon to Cheltenham Railway. Grasscroft, Oldham: Irwell Press. ISBN 978-1-871608-62-5.
- Butt, R.V.J. (1995). The Directory of Railway Stations. Yeovil: Patrick Stephens Ltd. ISBN 1-85260-508-1. R508.
- Clinker, C.R. (October 1978). Clinker's Register of Closed Passenger Stations and Goods Depots in England, Scotland and Wales 1830-1977. Bristol: Avon-Anglia Publications & Services. ISBN 0-905466-19-5.
- Kingscott, Geoffrey (2009). Lost Railways of Warwickshire. Newbury, Berkshire: Countryside Books. ISBN 978-1-84674-174-6.
- Maggs, Colin G.; Nicholson, Peter (1985). The Honeybourne Line: The continuing story of the Cheltenham to Honeybourne and Stratford upon Avon Railway. Cheltenham, Glos.: Line One Publishing. ISBN 978-0-907036-12-8.
- Mitchell, Victor E.; Smith, Keith (August 2005) [1998]. Stratford upon Avon to Cheltenham. Country Railway Routes. Midhurst: Middleton Press. ISBN 1-901706-25-7.
- Oppitz, Leslie (2004) [2002]. Lost Railways of Herefordshire & Worcestershire. Newbury, Berkshire: Countryside Books. ISBN 978-1-85306-754-9.
- Yorke, Stan (2009). Lost Railways of Gloucestershire. Newbury, Berkshire: Countryside Books. ISBN 978-1-84674-163-0.
