= Laverton railway station =

Laverton railway station may refer to:

- Laverton railway station, Melbourne in the Australian city of Melbourne
- Laverton Halt railway station, in the English county of Gloucestershire
