= Stratford on Avon and Broadway Railway =

Coordinates: 52°10′23″N 1°44′23″W

The Stratford on Avon and Broadway Railway project (SBR) was an English railway project whose aim was to re-open the closed railway line from Stratford-upon-Avon, Warwickshire to Honeybourne railway station, Worcestershire for main-line re-connection.

A later extension was planned to Broadway, Worcestershire where the line could link up with the proposed northern extension of the Gloucestershire Warwickshire Railway.

The railway operated at the former Long Marston Ministry of Defence depot. The railway operated at the north west corner of the site which is now the location of the proposed new Middle Quinton Eco-town.

== Activities ==
A short section of track remains as a freight-only line from Honeybourne to Long Marston and initial efforts were concentrated on this. A newsletter for members was published under the title The Shakespeare Express.

The SBR project was run by the Stratford on Avon and Broadway Railway Society (1999) Limited (SBRS) and the Society had locomotives and rolling stock stored at the former Ministry of Defence depot at Long Marston. The site was not generally open to the public but there were occasional open days. The site was also visited by railtours.

== Dissolution ==
On 14 February 2010 the Stratford on Avon and Broadway Railway Society (1999) Limited was dissolved because "...with little chance of opening the line between Stratford and Honeybourne within the next 10 years and the fewer volunteers, we only had two choices: find a new home or sell the stock".

It was envisaged that the rolling stock would be moved to the Berkeley Vale Railway which plans to use the Sharpness Branch Line. The Vale of Berkeley Railway eventually moved into the old engine shed at Sharpness Docks in August 2015. Some of the stock was sold and the remainder will be loaned to other railway societies. The Somerset & Dorset Railway Heritage Trust took delivery of two ex-Navy goods vans and a two-car diesel multiple unit on loan in October/November 2011. As of January 2016 the railway has some 80 members and has moved some of the assets to their new engineering base.

== Locomotives ==
SBR locomotives

=== Steam ===
- Hawthorn Leslie and Company 0-4-0ST, works no. 2800, Met
- Hawthorn Leslie and Company 0-4-0ST, works no. 3718, Swanscombe No.4
- Peckett and Sons 0-4-0ST, works no. 1903, LITTLE LADY
- Barclay 0-4-0ST, works no. 2220, Invicta No.8

=== Diesel ===
- Barclay 0-4-0DM, works no. 362, Mulberry 70047
- Fowler 0-4-0DM, works no. 4220022, ROF Chorley No.4

The Long Marston site is also used for the storage of surplus main line locomotives and rolling stock which do not form part of the SBR fleet.
