= Evesham Road Crossing Halt railway station =

Disused railway station in Stratford-upon-Avon, Warwickshire

Coordinates: 52.1887°N 1.7139°W

Evesham Road Crossing Halt
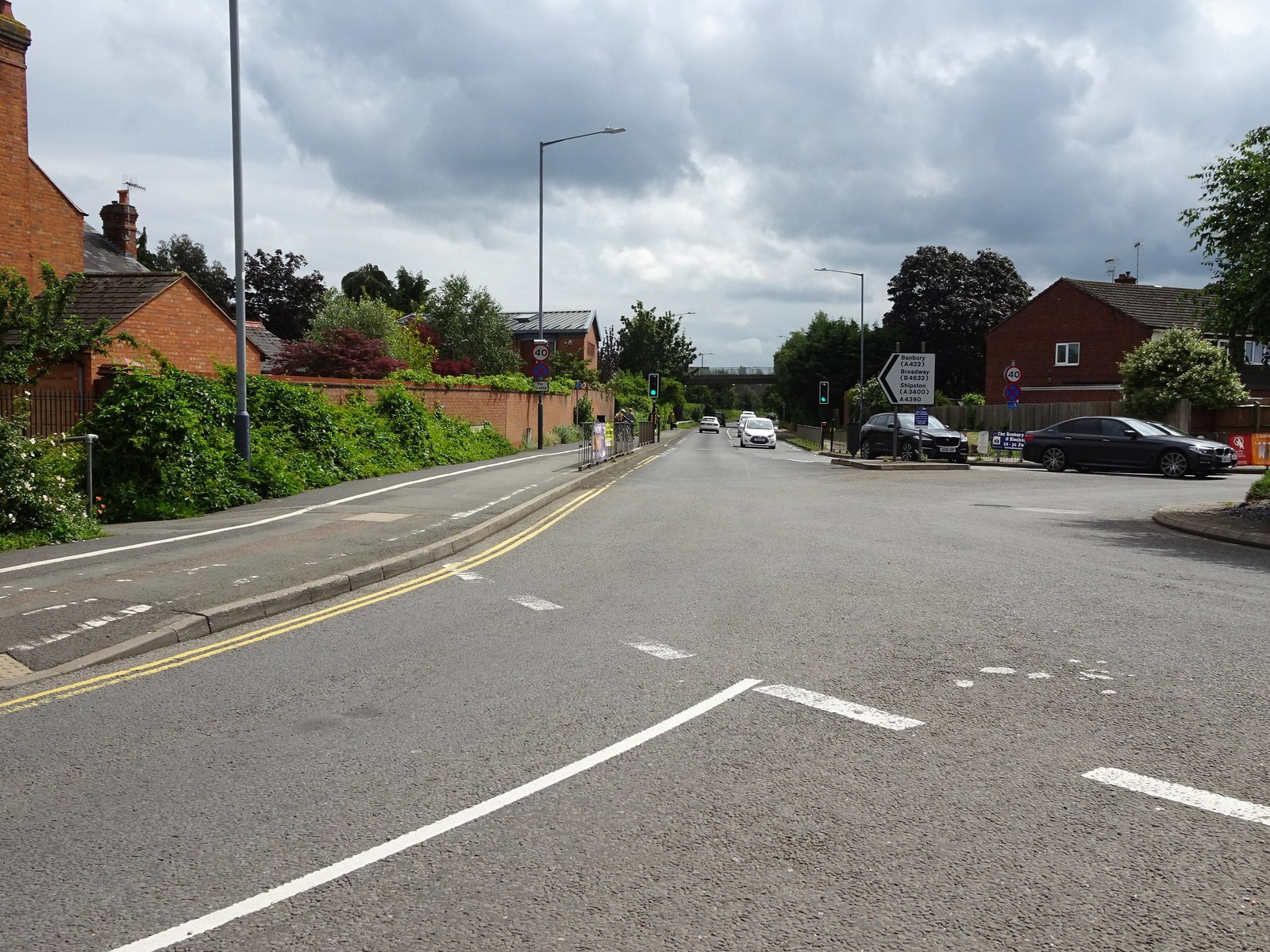
- The site of the station in 2019

General information
- Location: Stratford-upon-Avon, Warwickshire; England
- Platforms: 2

Other information
- Status: Disused

History
- Original company: Great Western Railway
- Pre-grouping: Great Western Railway

Key dates
- 17 October 1904: Opened as Evesham Road Crossing Halte
- April 1905: Name changed to Evesham Road Crossing Halt
- 14 July 1916: Closed
Location

Evesham Road Crossing Halt railway station served the town of Stratford-upon-Avon, Warwickshire, England from 1904 to 1916 on the Gloucestershire Warwickshire Railway.

== History ==
The station opened as Evesham Road Crossing Halte on 17 October 1904 by the Great Western Railway. The spelling of the suffix 'halte' was corrected to 'halt' in April 1905. Being a halt, it was unstaffed beside the nearby signal box which opened circa 1891 and operated the level crossing. The station closed on 14 July 1916, closing as a wartime economy measure but never opening again.

Preceding station	Historical railways	Following station
Chambers Crossing Halt; Line open, station closed	Gloucestershire Warwickshire Railway	Stratford-upon-Avon; Line and station open
