= Willersey Halt railway station =

Former railway station in Gloucestershire, England

Willersey Halt
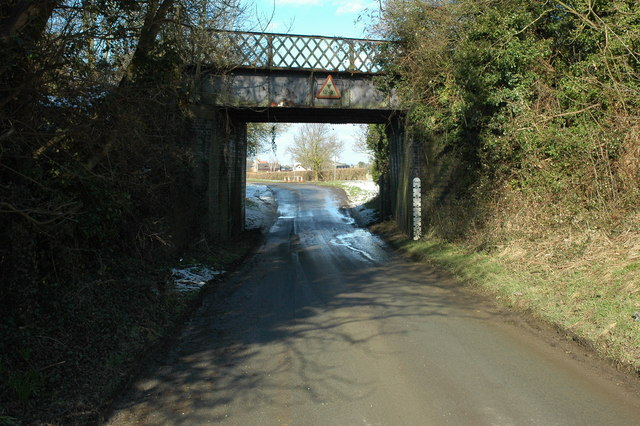
- Badsey Lane bridge near station site in February 2010.

General information
- Location: Willersey, Cotswold; England
- Coordinates: 52.0578°N 1.8519°W
- Grid reference: SP102399
- Platforms: 2

Other information
- Status: Disused

History
- Original company: Great Western Railway
- Pre-grouping: Great Western Railway
- Post-grouping: Great Western Railway

Key dates
- 1 August 1904: Opened
- 7 March 1960: Closed
Location

Willersey Halt railway station served the village of Willersey, Gloucestershire, England between 1904 and 1960.

== History ==
The halt was opened by the Great Western Railway on 1 August 1904. Situated only 1/2 mile (0.80 km) from the village of Willersey, the station was to the south-west of the road bridge, and there were two 100-foot (30 m) wooden platforms, each with a corrugated iron "pagoda" shelter. As with Gretton Halt and Laverton Halt, no sidings or facilities were provided. The halt came under the responsibility of the stationmaster at Broadway. The initial service consisted of 9 Down and 8 Up railmotor services a day. In November 1906, authorisation was given for the extension of the platforms to 152 feet (46 m) at a cost of £30.

It was closed by British Railways on 7 March 1960.

== Present day ==
Little remains of the halt apart from some old railings at the end of the footpath on the village side. The trackbed through the site is unbreached and is in use as a footpath.

Preceding station	Disused railways	Following station
Broadway; Line closed station open	Great Western Railway; Honeybourne Line	Weston-sub-Edge; Line and station closed
