= Milcote =

Village in Warwickshire, England

Coordinates: 52.1717°N 1.7339°W

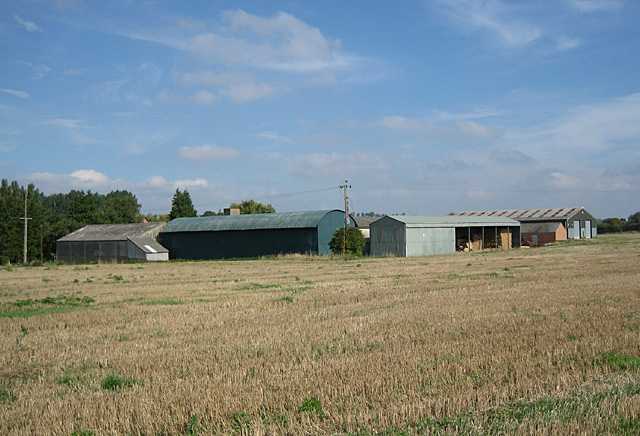

- Location within Warwickshire
- Population: 55 (2001 census)
- Civil parish: Clifford Chambers and Milcote
- District: Stratford-on-Avon
- Shire county: Warwickshire
- Region: West Midlands
- Country: England
- Sovereign state: United Kingdom

Milcote is a village and former civil parish, now in the parish of Clifford Chambers and Milcote, in the Stratford-on-Avon district, in Warwickshire, England. It falls within the ecclesiastical parish of All Saints Church. It was made up of Upper Milcote or Milcote-on-Stour, site of Mount Grevill manor (begun by Ludovic Greville), and Lower Milcote or Milcote-on-Avon. Milcote was one of the estates which Ceolred of Mercia is said to have granted to Evesham Abbey in 710. It was then appropriated by the bishop of Worcester, recovered by abbot Aethelwig, seized again by bishop Odo of Bayeux and never returned to the Abbey. Much later it passed to the Greville family. In 2001 it had a population of 55.

The village was served by Milcote railway station from 1859 to 1966. It was originally part of the ecclesiastical and civil parish of Weston-on-Avon, but became a civil parish in its own right in 1894. That civil parish was formed by a 2-mile-long 609-acre strip of land (with an average depth of 0.5 miles) running along the river Avon's south bank from its junction with the river Stour. Its population in 1894 was 50. It and the civil parish of Clifford Chambers merged on 1 April 2004 to form the civil parish of "Clifford Chambers and Milcote".
