= Weston-sub-Edge railway station =

Former railway station in Gloucestershire, England

Coordinates: 52.07358°N 1.83181°W

Weston-sub-Edge
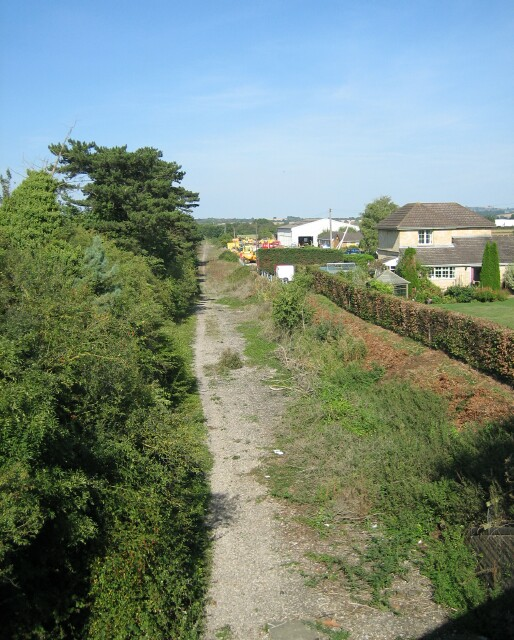
- Station site in 2005.

General information
- Location: Weston-sub-Edge, Cotswold; England
- Grid reference: SP116417
- Platforms: 2

Other information
- Status: Disused

History
- Original company: Great Western Railway
- Post-grouping: Great Western Railway; Western Region of British Railways

Key dates
- 1 August 1904: Opened as Bretforton & Weston-sub-Edge
- 1 May 1907: Renamed Weston-sub-Edge
- 25 September 1950: Closed to goods
- 7 March 1960: Closed to passengers
Location

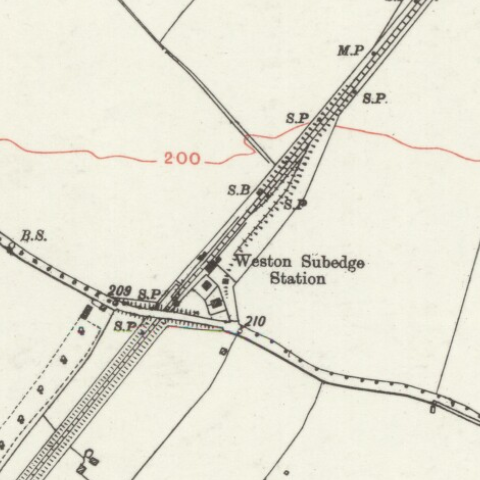
Map of the Honeybourne Line station at Weston Subedge as surveyed in 1921

Weston-sub-Edge railway station is a disused station on the Honeybourne Line from Stratford-upon-Avon to Cheltenham which served the village of Weston-sub-Edge in Gloucestershire between 1904 and 1960.

== History ==
On 9 July 1859, the Oxford, Worcester and Wolverhampton Railway opened a line from Stratford-upon-Avon to Honeybourne. The OW&W became the West Midland Railway in 1860 and was acquired by Great Western Railway in 1883 with a view to combining it with the Birmingham to Stratford Line to create a high-speed route from the Midlands to the South West. The GWR obtained authorisation in 1899 for the construction of a double-track line between Honeybourne and Cheltenham and this was completed in stages by 1908.

As the first station on the new line, Weston-sub-Edge was opened on 1 August 1904. Initially known as Bretforton and Weston-sub-Edge until 1 May 1907, the station was a mile from Weston-sub-Edge and 3 miles (4.8 km) from Bretforton. It was located immediately to the north of the bridge carrying the B4035 road over the line from which a footpath led down to the 'Up' platform. The 400-foot (120 m) platforms were equipped with the usual lamps, nameboards and fencing. A 27-lever signal box was provided on the 'Up' side to the south of the platform and it controlled a siding capable of holding 15 wagons, as well as access to the small goods yard, equipped with a small goods shed, 6-ton crane and weighbridge, which handled mainly agricultural and, in particular, meat for use in the production of animal glue. Average tonnage handled was around 3,000 tons a year in the 1920s, which began to fall off in the 1930s before picking up again in the Second World War when it reached a peak of 15,366 in 1941. The principal generator of wartime traffic was the airfield established to the north-west of the station behind the signalbox; the airfield was known as Honeybourne and its personnel used the station.

A stationmaster's house was located adjacent to the goods yard on the 'Down' side, although Weston-sub-Edge only had a stationmaster until 1932 after which the station came under the control of the Broadway stationmaster. Adjoining the house was accommodation for other staff: a ganger and platelayer. The goods yard closed on 25 September 1950, followed soon after by the signalbox on 8 October 1950. From this point, the station became a large unstaffed halt until its closure on 7 March 1960 with the withdrawal of local passenger trains on the line.

Disused railways
| Willersey Halt; Line and station closed | Great Western Railway; Honeybourne Line | Honeybourne; Line closed, station open |
| Preceding station | Heritage railways | Following station |
Proposed extension
| Broadway towards Cheltenham Race Course | Gloucestershire Warwickshire Railway | Honeybourne towards Stratford-upon-Avon |

== Present and future ==
Little trace remains of Weston-sub-Edge station. The 'Up' platform building was dismantled and re-erected at Carrog on the Llangollen Railway whilst the trackbed and road bridge remain as part of a footpath and cycleway.

The Gloucestershire Warwickshire Railway aims to reopen the line through Weston-sub-Edge as part of an extension of its line to Honeybourne. This might even include rebuilding and reopening the station site itself, once fundraising and support from locals nearby is obtained.

== Sources ==
- Baker, Audie (1994). The Stratford on Avon to Cheltenham Railway. Grasscroft, Oldham: Irwell Press. ISBN 978-1-871608-62-5.
- Butt, R.V.J. (1995). The Directory of Railway Stations. Yeovil: Patrick Stephens Ltd. ISBN 1-85260-508-1. R508.
- Clinker, C.R. (October 1978). Clinker's Register of Closed Passenger Stations and Goods Depots in England, Scotland and Wales 1830-1977. Bristol: Avon-Anglia Publications & Services. ISBN 0-905466-19-5.
- Kingscott, Geoffrey (2009). Lost Railways of Warwickshire. Newbury, Berkshire: Countryside Books. ISBN 978-1-84674-174-6.
- Maggs, Colin G.; Nicholson, Peter (1985). The Honeybourne Line: The continuing story of the Cheltenham to Honeybourne and Stratford upon Avon Railway. Cheltenham, Glos.: Line One Publishing. ISBN 978-0-907036-12-8.
- Mitchell, Victor E.; Smith, Keith (August 2005) [1998]. Stratford upon Avon to Cheltenham. Country Railway Routes. Midhurst: Middleton Press. ISBN 1-901706-25-7.
- Oppitz, Leslie (2004) [2002]. Lost Railways of Herefordshire & Worcestershire. Newbury, Berkshire: Countryside Books. ISBN 978-1-85306-754-9.
- Quick, Michael (2009) [2001]. Railway passenger stations in Great Britain: a chronology (4th ed.). Oxford: Railway & Canal Historical Society. ISBN 978-0-901461-57-5. OCLC 612226077.
- Siviter, Roger (2003) [1997]. The Gloucestershire Warwickshire Railway. Kettering, Northants: Past & Present Publishing. ISBN 1-85895-208-5.
- Yorke, Stan (2009). Lost Railways of Gloucestershire. Newbury, Berkshire: Countryside Books. ISBN 978-1-84674-163-0.
