= Long Marston, Warwickshire =

Village in Warwickshire, England

Coordinates: 52.136°N 1.777°W

Long Marston
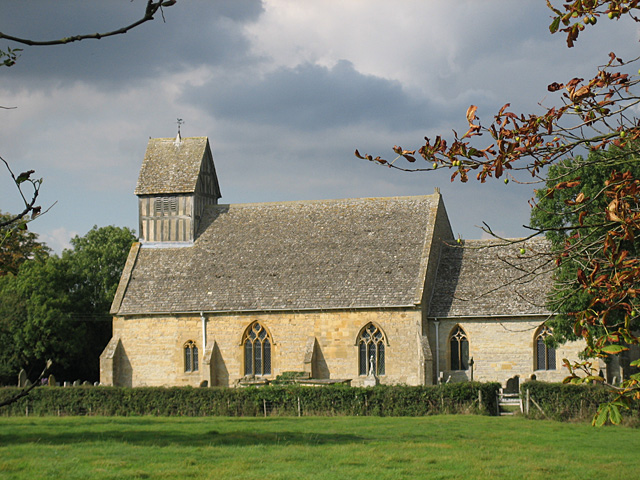
- St James' parish church

- Location within
- Population: 1,630 (2021 census)
- OS grid reference: SP1548
- Civil parish: Long Marston
- District: Stratford-on-Avon,
- Shire county: Warwickshire,
- Region: West Midlands
- Country: England
- Sovereign state: United Kingdom
- Post town: STRATFORD-UPON-AVON
- Postcode district: CV37
- Dialling code: 01789
- Ambulance: West Midlands
- Website: Marston Sicca Parish Council

Long Marston is a former village and planned new town under development, which lies about 5 miles (8 km) south-west of Stratford-upon-Avon, in Warwickshire, England; historically, the village was in Gloucestershire. The southern and western boundaries of the civil parish form part of the county boundary with Worcestershire. The 2021 census recorded the parish's population as 1,630.

== History ==
Long Marston was part of Gloucestershire until 1931, when the Provisional Order Confirmation (Gloucestershire, Warwickshire and Worcestershire) Act moved Marston Sicca Rural District into Warwickshire. The civil parish was also renamed from Marston Sicca to Long Marston in 1931.

It was recorded in the Domesday Book:

"In Celfledetorn Hundred, St Mary's Priory and Cathedral in Merestone, holds 10 hides. In lordship 3 ploughs; 15 villagers and 3 smallholders with 12 ploughs. 6 slaves; meadow at 10s. The value was £8; now 100s."

The name of the hundred, Celfledethon means Ceolflaed's thorn, perhaps indicating that the original meeting place in the centre of the hundred was a thorn tree.

Long Marston is known as one of the Shakespeare villages. William Shakespeare is said to have joined a party of Stratford folk, which set itself to outdrink a drinking club at Bidford-on-Avon; as a result of his labours in that regard to have fallen asleep under the crab tree of which a descendant is still called "Shakespeare's tree". When morning dawned, his friends wished to renew the encounter but he wisely said "No, I have drunk with Piping Pebworth, Dancing Marston, Haunted Hillboro', Hungry Grafton, Dodging Exhall, Papist Wixford, Beggarly Broom and Drunken Bidford' and so, presumably, I will drink no more." The story is said to date from the 17th century, but of its truth or of any connection of the story or the verse to Shakespeare there is no evidence.

On 10 September 1651, Charles II stayed in Long Marston at the house of a kinsman of Jane Lane called Tomes; he was on his way from Bentley Hall to Abbots Leigh during his escape following the defeat of the army at the Battle of Worcester. He was travelling incognito as a servant to Jane Lane, sister-in-law of George Norton, the owner of the house at Abbots Leigh to which they were bound. In keeping with his outward guise as a servant, the cook of the house put him to work in the kitchen winding the jack used to roast meat in the fireplace. Charles was clumsy at this, but explained his clumsiness by saying that as the son of poor people, he so rarely ate meat that he did not know how to use a roasting jack. Given the state of the economy at the time, his story was accepted and he was not identified.

== Expansion plans ==
Talk of expanding Long Marston dates back to May 2007, when prime minister Gordon Brown announced that it was one potential site for an eco-town, which would have seen it be renamed Middle Quinton. Although the Middle Quinton plan was ultimately scrapped in 2010, the idea was revived in an announcement in January 2017 when Long Marston was targeted for expansion by the government for a second time. It was classified as a garden village and has held the title ever since; the designation for new towns drawing inspiration from Ebenezer Howard's garden city movement. The garden villages have been described as intended to be "modern market towns with a focus on mixed use."

The first residents moved into Fernleigh Park, Long Marston's first new-build housing development as part of the garden village project, in early 2022. In 2025, Long Marston was also labelled one of several "potential new settlement" locations by Warwickshire County Council, which would see even more homes built if approved.

== Parish church ==
The Church of England parish church of Saint James the Great has a 14th-century Decorated Gothic nave and chancel, but was rebuilt in the 19th century. The church is a Grade I listed building; the pulpit is Jacobean. Its parish is part of the Benefice of Quinton, Welford-on-Avon, Weston-on-Avon and Marston Sicca.

== Transport ==
=== Railway ===
In 1859, the Oxford, Worcester and Wolverhampton Railway opened a branch line from Honeybourne to Stratford upon Avon. Long Marston railway station opened at the same time, as one of the stops on the line. In 1966, British Rail withdrew passenger services between Honeybourne and Stratford; it closed Long Marston station and the line became only used by freight traffic and summer diversion trains between Birmingham and Cheltenham. The line between Honeybourne and Long Marston remains open for non-passenger trains to and from the former Ministry of Defence (MoD) depot.

==== Rolling stock storage depot ====
Long Marston depot is a former MoD facility, south-east of the village. Since the privatisation of British Rail in the mid-1990s, rolling stock companies have used the depot to store their out-of-lease rolling stock.

In about 2009, the depot's owners, St. Modwen Properties, along with The Bird Group of Companies, proposed to redevelop the site as Middle Quinton eco-town. However, in June 2021, Porterbrook purchased the site both for long-term rolling stock storage and to develop its Rail Innovation Centre.

=== Airfield ===
Long Marston Airfield is north-east of the village. It was built in 1940 as RAF Long Marston and decommissioned as a military airfield in 1958.

Since 1987, the airfield has been the venue of the Bulldog Bash, considered to be one of Europe's most popular annual motorcycle festivals. Since 2001, the airfield has also been the venue of the annual Global Gathering club music festival.

== Amenities ==
When developed, it is anticipated that the garden village will include a town centre in its own right, including a community hall, medical centre and schools.

== See also ==
- Middle Quinton
- New towns in the United Kingdom
