= Shakespeare Institute =

Research centre in Stratford-upon-Avon

The Shakespeare Institute
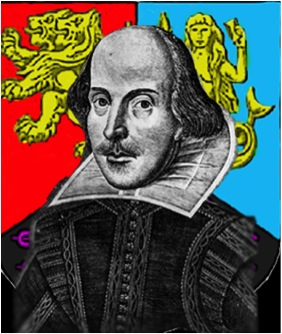
- Mason Croft
- Motto: Latin: Per Ardua Ad Alta
- Motto in English: "Through efforts to high things"
- Established: 1951
- Parent institution: The University of Birmingham
- Director: Michael Dobson
- Postgraduates: 150
- Location: Mason Croft, Church Street, Stratford Upon Avon, CV37 6HP; 52°11′23″N 1°42′34″W
- Website: www.shakespeare.bham.ac.uk

The Shakespeare Institute is a centre for postgraduate study dedicated to the study of William Shakespeare and the literature of the English Renaissance. It is part of the University of Birmingham, and is currently located in Stratford-upon-Avon. In September 2027 it will again move out of Stratford. Concern has been raised as to the future of its library of Shakespeare criticism, the director will resign “rather than aiding and abetting this move” and the deputy director has accepted a post at Yale University.

The Institute was set up in 1951 at Mason Croft, the former home of novelist Marie Corelli. Budgetary problems forced it to be relocated to the main campus at Birmingham during the 1970s, but under the guidance of Professor Stanley Wells, the Institute was returned to Mason Croft in the 1980s and its position was consolidated in 1996 with the opening of the purpose-built Shakespeare Institute Library.

It had been described by the current director, Michael Dobson, as "the best place on earth in which to explore the impact Shakespeare’s work has had across four centuries of world culture".

== Directors of the Institute ==
The directors of the Institute have been:

- Allardyce Nicoll 1951 to 1961
- Terence Spencer
- Philip Brockbank
- Stanley Wells
- Peter Holland
- Russell Jackson
- Kathleen McLuskie
- Michael Dobson

== Notable alumni ==
Sarah Hosking (arts administrator)

== Shakespeare Institute Library ==
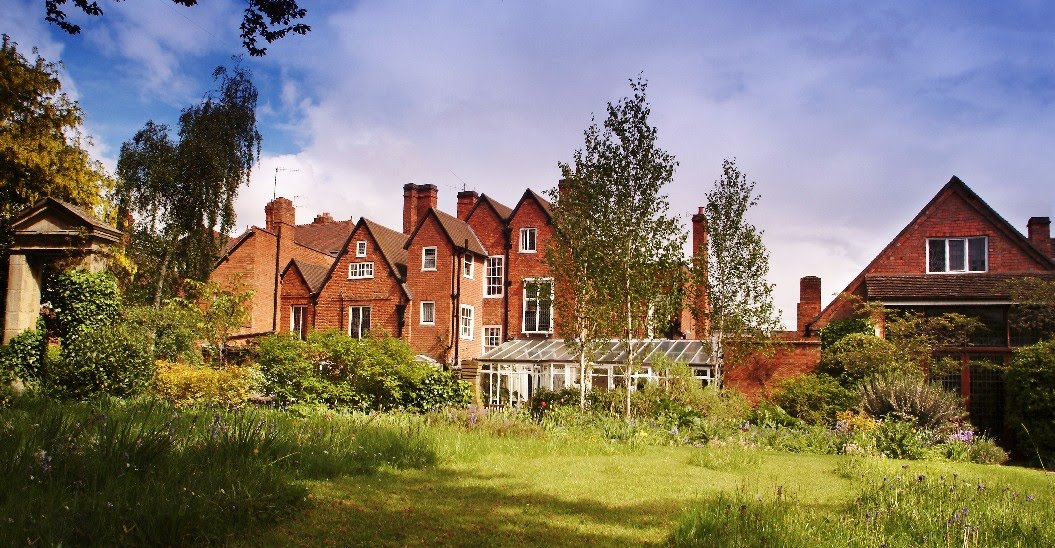
The Shakespeare Institute Garden

The Shakespeare Institute Library contains about 60,000 volumes (including 3,000 early printed and rare books), archives and manuscripts, and audio-visual collections. The library aims to collect every significant publication for the study of Shakespeare and Renaissance drama and the supporting collections cover literary, cultural, political, religious, and social history of the period. Significant research collections include:

- Renaissance Theatre Company archive
- Renaissance Films PLC archive
- Unpublished Shakespeare Film Script collection
- New Shakespeare Company archive
- E. K. Chambers Papers
- Newscuttings collection 1902–present
- English Short Title Catalogue 1475–1640 on microfilm
- Francis Longe Play Collection on microfilm.

== Shakespeare Institute Players ==
The Shakespeare Institute Players is the dramatic society for the postgraduate students of the University of Birmingham's Shakespeare Institute, located in Stratford-upon-Avon. The Shakespeare Institute Players have been around under many different names since the University of Birmingham's Shakespeare Institute has existed. The first recorded production was A Yorkshire Tragedy (Unknown Author) as The Shakespeare Institute Dramatic Society. It was performed in February 1953. Since then, the group has had many different names, but the most commonly used name (and the one by which it is currently known) is The Shakespeare Institute Players.
