= Sarah Hosking (arts administrator) =

British arts administrator

Sarah Hosking MBE
- Occupation: Arts administrator
- Known for: Founder of the Hosking Houses Trust
- Parent(s): Alma Ramsey (mother); Hugh Richard Hosking (father)
- Relatives: Simon Hosking (brother)

Sarah Hosking MBE is a British arts administrator. After working for forty years in different sectors of the arts as a painter, art teacher, visual arts officer, writer, and interior and garden designer for the NHS, she retired and founded the Hosking Houses Trust in the village of Clifford Chambers, Warwickshire. Hosking bought Church Cottage in the village to offer 'a room of one's own' (in Virginia Woolf's words) with financial uplift to overworked, impecunious, mature women writers and artists.

== Early life ==
Hosking’s mother was Alma Ramsey, a British artist and sculptor. Her father, Hugh Richard Hosking, was a painter, muralist and teacher. Sarah had a brother named Simon.

== Education and career ==
In the early 1960s, Hosking trained as a painter at St Albans and Leicester colleges of art. She taught art for a while before re-training in 1970 as an arts administrator with the Arts Council. From 1972, Hosking was the visual arts officer for the newly formed East Midlands Arts Association. She started their artist-in-residence and aid to artists programmes, as well as putting on exhibitions. In 1980, Hosking worked as a freelancer in exhibitions and arts management. That year she also set up and ran her own studio in Northamptonshire, closing it six years later. After lecturing on business studies for ARTLAW, she published a book on self-employment for artists and craftspeople. Hosking then worked for the NHS as an interior and garden designer with the Special Hospitals Service Authority, developing a healing environment for long-term patients at Broadmoor and Ashworth Special Hospitals. She co-authored a book on the subject of non-medical aspects of patient care. After retiring, Hosking gained an MA in Shakespeare and Renaissance Cultural History from the Shakespeare Institute (Birmingham University) in 2005.

Inspired many years earlier by Virginia Wolf’s suggestion that a woman needs a room of her own and money if she is to write, Hosking went about providing both a room and some financial support by setting up the Hosking Houses Trust in 1995 in the village of Clifford Chambers. The village is walking distance from Stratford upon Avon. The trust is a registered charity. Hosking bought Church Cottage, near her own cottage, in 1998 as a place where writers and artists could stay in peace with a little financial support if necessary. She continued fund-raising in 1999 and the first writer was in residence by 2002. In 2017, The Arts Council gave a capital grant of £37,000 for a studio extension onto the side of Church Cottage. The extension was officially opened by Dame Joan Bakewell in May, 2019. Emma Thompson is a patron of the Hosking Houses Trust. Since 2002 more than 100 writers and artists have stayed in the cottage, writing poetry, novels and plays and making art for exhibitions. They include Timberlake Wertenbaker, Joan Bakewell, Salley Vickers, Maggie Gee, Chinonyerem Odimba and Wendy Cope. Fiona McIntyre was in residence at Church Cottage and exhibited in October 2024. The trust has now purchased a second cottage to be used as a peaceful place for women writers and artists.

== Publications ==
- Working for yourself in the arts and crafts Hosking, S. 2nd edition (1989) Kogan Page ISBN 9781850917175
- Healing the Hospital Environment: design, management and maintenance of healthcare premises Hosking, S and L, Haggard (1999) ISBN 9781138435896
- Round the Square and Up the Tower: Clifford Chambers, Warwickshire Hosking, S (2014) ISBN 9780957314221
- Hosking contributed the chapter ‘Coventry Cathedral’ for The Edinburgh Companion to the Bible and the Arts by Prickett Steven Edinburgh University Press (2014) ISBN 9781399544030. (Hosking’s mother, Alma Ramsey, created the Nativity and Epiphany Crib at Coventry Cathedral, commissioned by Basil Spence in 1962. The scene was restored in 2007)
- Five Pounds for a Room of One's Own Hosking, S (forthcoming)

== Awards ==
In 2022, Hosking was made an honorary fellow of the Royal Society of Literature. She was awarded an MBE for services to literature and the arts in the King’s Birthday Honours list in the summer of 2024. It was awarded in recognition not only of her foundation of the Hosking Houses Trust, but also for her innovative work in the world of government arts subsidy during the 1970s/80s and for her work in the NHS on environmental issues. In April, 2025, Hosking was awarded a Times Sternberg Active Life Award. These annual awards are given to those over 70 who have embarked upon enterprises after retiring from their professional careers. Hosking was nominated for her ‘extraordinary dedication to supporting women writers and artists.’
