= Alma Ramsey =

British artist

- Born: 1907; Tunbridge Wells, England
- Died: 1993 (aged 85–86)
- Education: Bournemouth School of Art; Royal College of Art
- Known for: Sculpture
- Spouse: Hugh Richard Hosking

Alma Ramsey later Alma Ramsey-Hosking (1907–1993) was a British artist and sculptor.

== Biography ==
Ramsey was born in Tunbridge Wells in Kent and studied at the Bournemouth School of Art. She studied at the Royal College of Art in London from 1927 to 1930 where she was taught by both Gilbert Ledward and Henry Moore which fostered Ramsey's interest in creating sculpture by direct carving. Throughout her subsequent career Ramsey was a prolific participant in group exhibitions and also had several solo shows. Her first solo show was at the Peter Dingley Gallery in Stratford upon Avon during 1966. Further solo exhibitions of her work took place at the Herbert Art Gallery in Coventry in 1969, at Southwell Minster in 1972, Stoke-on-Trent Art Gallery in 1980 and at Warwick Museum in 1980. Public commissions of her sculptures included a crib for Coventry Cathedral, a figure of Christ in Glory for a church in Elmdon Heath and a wall-mounted group piece, Sir Guy and the Dun Cow, for a shopping centre in Coventry. Both the Herbert Art Gallery and Leamington Art Gallery plus the Oxford City and County Museum hold examples of her work. Ramsey was the mother of Sarah Hosking (arts administrator).
