= Middle Quinton =

Proposed town in Warwickshire, England

Coordinates: 52.123°N 1.761°W

Middle Quinton is the name given by the developers St. Modwen Properties and The Bird Group to a proposed new eco-town near Long Marston in Warwickshire, England.

On 3 April 2008 the UK government announced the proposal had been shortlisted along with 14 other locations. 10 proposals are expected to be built by 2020.

== Eco-town proposal ==
The proposed eco-town would be six miles south-west of Stratford-upon-Avon. The majority of the 240ha site is the former Long Marston Royal Engineers depot which is now owned by St Modwen. The remainder is land owned by the Bird Group which is currently used as a business park.

The plans are for at least 6,000 zero carbon homes including 2,000 affordable houses and community infrastructure including up to four schools, health care and retail facilities.

About two-thirds of the site is in Warwickshire and one-third in Worcestershire and lies in both the parliamentary constituencies of Stratford-on-Avon and Mid-Worcestershire.

On 4 September 2008, St Modwen and the Bird Group published a document entitled "A VISION FOR MIDDLE QUINTON ECO-TOWN". The document includes diagrams showing six phases of development over a fifteen-year period.

The second round of consultation on eco-towns ran from 4 November 2008 until 19 February 2009.

== Opposition to the town ==
The proposed town is opposed by a group of local residents named the BARD (Better Accessible Responsible Development) campaign. The BARD campaign is backed by Dame Judi Dench and John Nettles.

On 12 May 2008 Stratford-on-Avon District Council voted unanimously to oppose Middle Quinton but developers announced that they would continue with their plans.

As part of their campaign, BARD has launched a judicial review into the eco-town consultation process.

== Transport ==
A preserved railway facility at the north west corner of the site was run by the, now defunct, Stratford on Avon and Broadway Railway Society.
