= Broad Marston Halt railway station =

Disused railway station in Pebworth, Worcestershire

Broad Marston Halt

General information
- Location: Pebworth, Worcestershire; England
- Platforms: 1; 2 (later added)

Other information
- Status: Disused

History
- Original company: Great Western Railway
- Pre-grouping: Great Western Railway

Key dates
- 17 October 1904: Opened as Broad Marston Halte
- 14 July 1916: Closed

Broad Marston Halt railway station served the village of Pebworth, Worcestershire, England from 1904 to 1916 on the Gloucestershire Warwickshire Railway.

== History ==
The station opened as Broad Marston Halte on 17 October 1904 by the Great Western Railway. The spelling of the suffix 'halte' was later corrected to 'halt'. It initially had only one platform but a second one was added on 28 April 1907. The station closed on 14 July 1916, closing as a wartime economy measure but never opening again.

Preceding station	Historical railways	Following station
Pebworth Halt; Line open, station closed	Gloucestershire Warwickshire Railway	Long Marston; Line open, station closed
