= Broadway railway station =

Railway station in Worcestershire, England

Coordinates: 52.04293°N 1.87196°W

Broadway
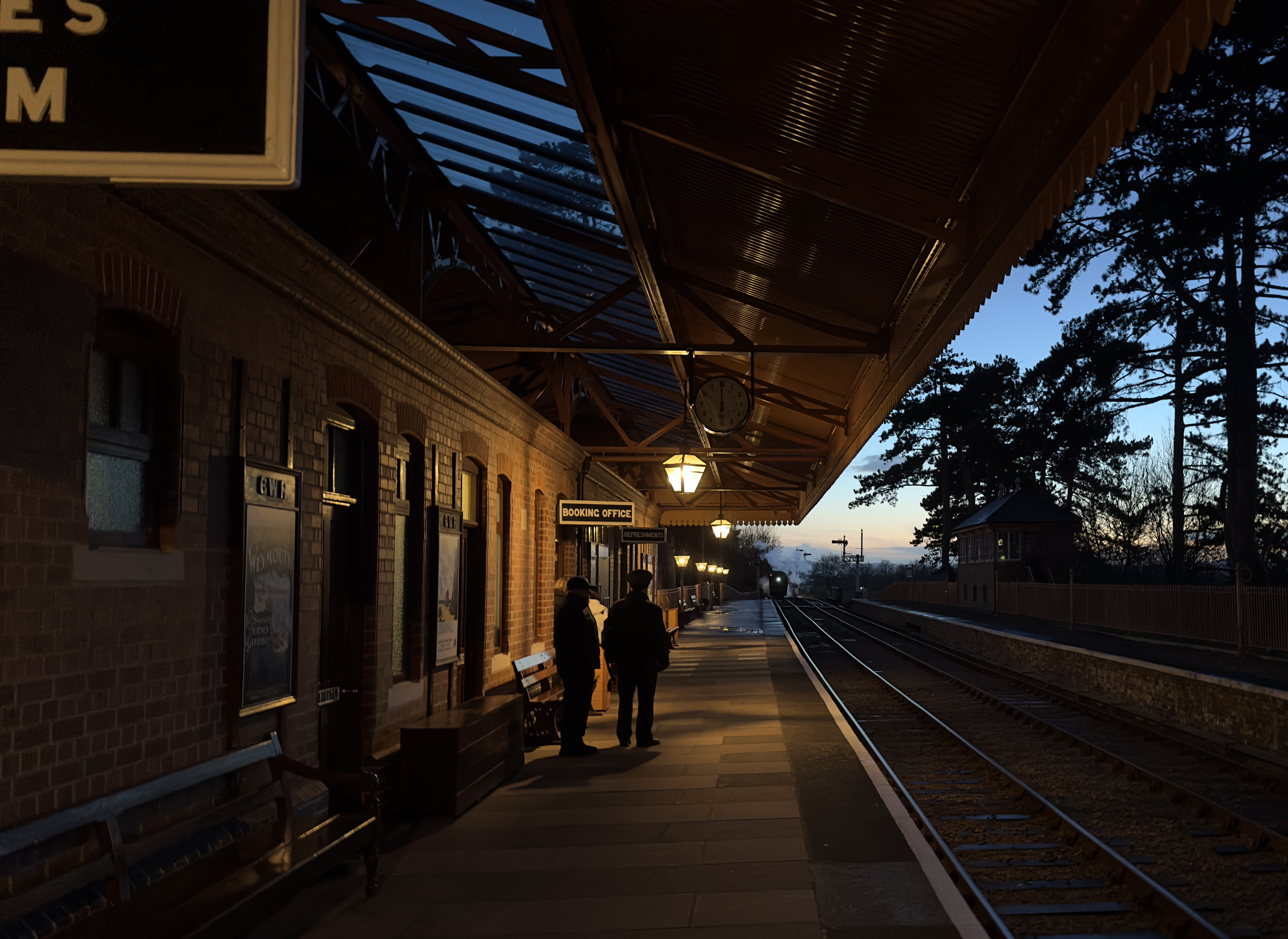
- The station in 2023

General information
- Location: Broadway, Wychavon, Worcestershire; England
- Platforms: 2

Other information
- Website: www.gwsr.com

History
- Original company: Great Western Railway
- Pre-grouping: Great Western Railway
- Post-grouping: Great Western Railway

Key dates
- 1 October 1904: Opened
- 7 March 1960: Closed to passengers
- 1 June 1964: Goods facilities withdrawn
- 30 March 2018: Reopened
Location

Broadway railway station is a railway station on the heritage Gloucestershire Warwickshire Railway in the village of Broadway in Worcestershire, England.

== History ==
The original station opened in 1904, and closed to passengers in 1960; the original station buildings were demolished in autumn 1963 although the line through the site remained open for regular passenger trains until 1968 and goods until official closure in November 1976.

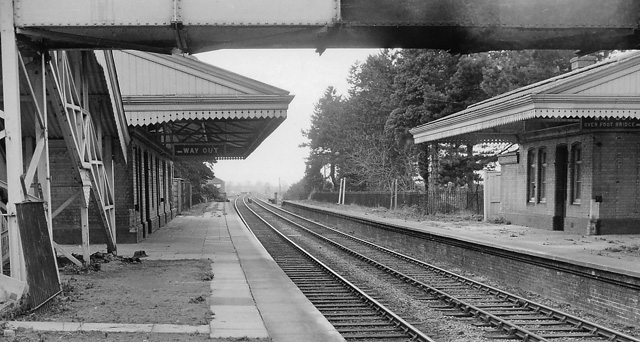
The station in 1962

=== Stationmasters ===
- George James Fifield 1904 – c. 1920
- Sidney James Prothero 1928–1935
- William Barber 1935–1942 (afterwards station master at Stoke Edith)
- E.T. Rose 1942 – 1944 (formerly station master at Bewdley, afterwards station master at Shipston-under-Wychwood)
- W.L. Mann 1944–1945
- W.S.B.M. Allen 1945 – 1950
- W.H. Jennings from 1950

== Preservation ==
GWR 2884 Class no.3850 opposite Broadway signal box

In 2009 the Broadway Area Group of the Gloucestershire Warwickshire Railway Trust started work clearing the derelict site. Over the next 9 years both platforms were rebuilt, a signal box on platform 2 was constructed and fitted out, the main station building was completed and the footbridge span and steps were erected (having been acquired from Henley-in-Arden Station via Network Rail as part of their footbridge replacement scheme).

The main station building has been built to modern standards with toilets, a booking office and refreshment room. To accommodate modern facilities it is around a third longer than the building of 1904 although it remains a faithful recreation of the original.

A view through the Platform 1 canopy to the Platform 2 waiting room under construction, July 2026

The new signal box is platform mounted and is a copy of the signal box which once stood at Shirley. It has been fully fitted out and was commissioned in October 2026.

The platform 2 waiting room is set to be completed by the end of 2027 and will allow trains to run into both platforms for the first time since 1960. This is also the final part of the project to rebuild the station.

The four-mile section of track from Toddington towards Broadway station was relaid between 2015 and 2018. Fund raising for the project included a 2016 share offer, "Broadway: the last mile", to complete the last mile of track. Track-laying commenced in the cutting north of the station during summer 2017 and was completed by year end. Until March 2018 trains had run as far as Laverton Halt although from May 2017 onwards the extension to Little Buckland was brought into use.

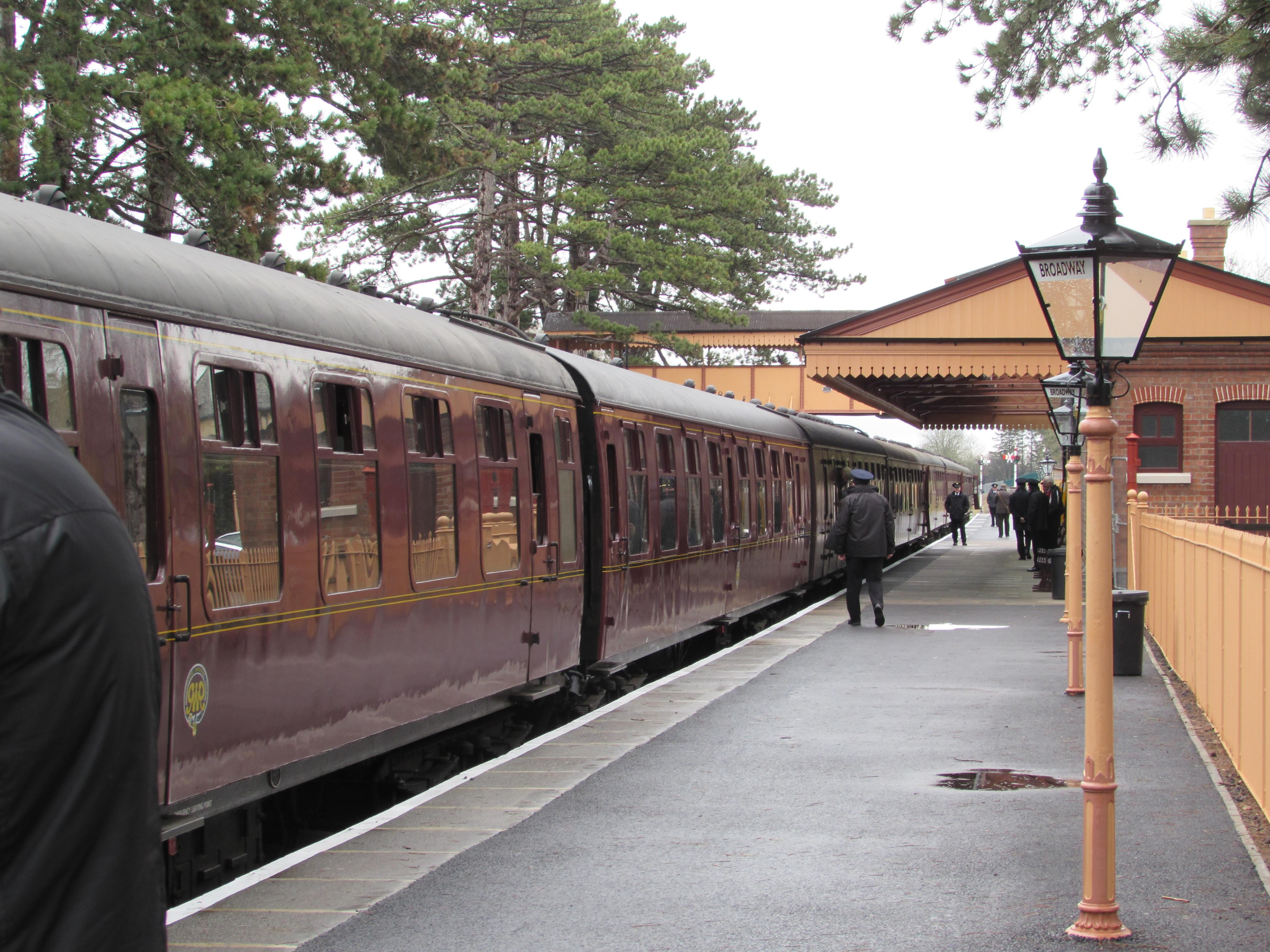
The station in March 2018

On Christmas Eve of 2017 the first train since 1960 arrived at Broadway Station after volunteers had finished laying the track the previous day.The works train was hauled by an English Electric Class 20 and Electro Diesel Class 73. The first test steam train was hauled by 7903 'Foremarke Hall' on 9 March 2018. The first volunteer passenger train arrived on 21 March 2018, hauled by 35006 'Peninsular & Oriental S. N. Co.'

Public passenger services began on 30 March 2018. By May 2018 the Gloucestershire Warwickshire Railway saw an increase in overall passenger numbers of over 14,000 passengers compared to the previous year, primarily due to the opening of the station at Broadway.

Preceding station	Heritage railways	Following station
Toddington towards Cheltenham Race Course	Gloucestershire Warwickshire Railway	Terminus
Proposed extension
Toddington towards Cheltenham Race Course	Gloucestershire Warwickshire Railway	Weston-sub-Edge towards Stratford-upon-Avon
Historical railways
Laverton Halt; Line open, station closed	Great Western Railway; Honeybourne Line	Willersey Halt; Line and station closed
