= Honeybourne =

Village and civil parish in Worcestershire, England

Coordinates: 52.095°N 1.831°W

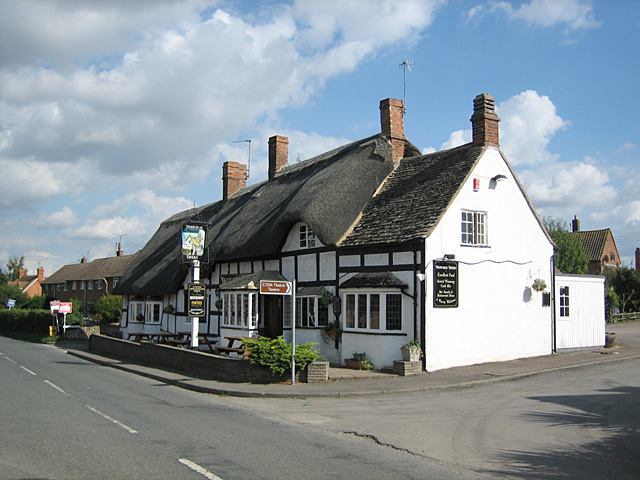
- The Thatched Tavern

- Location within Worcestershire
- Population: 1,619 (2001 census)
- OS grid reference: SP1144
- Civil parish: Honeybourne
- District: Wychavon
- Shire county: Worcestershire
- Region: West Midlands
- Country: England
- Sovereign state: United Kingdom
- Post town: EVESHAM
- Postcode district: WR11
- Dialling code: 01386
- Police: West Mercia
- Fire: Hereford and Worcester
- Ambulance: West Midlands

Honeybourne is a village and civil parish about 5 miles (8 km) east of Evesham, in the Wychavon district, in Worcestershire, England. Much of the parish are farmland. RAF Honeybourne just south of the village was operational from 1940 until 1947. In 2001, the parish had a population of 1619.

== History ==
Honeybourne was two villages: Church Honeybourne in Worcestershire and Cow Honeybourne in Gloucestershire. Their names are derived from Old English hunig, "honey" and burna, "stream," the whole meaning "(places on) the stream by which honey is found," the first word of Cow Honeybourne comes from Old English calu, "bare, lacking vegetation." Boundary changes in 1931 moved Cow Honeybourne into Worcestershire and the two parishes were united in 1958. Honeybourne has several historic timber framed and thatched buildings. The Thatched Tavern in Cow Honeybourne has a cruck truss.

=== Parish churches ===
In Church Honeybourne, the Church of England parish church of Saint Ecgwin was consecrated in 1295. Its antiquity is reflected in a local rhyme "when Evesham was bush and thorn there was a church at Honeybourne." Its nave and chancel appear to be original late-13th-century structures. There was a south aisle, but it was demolished and its windows re-set in the south wall of the nave. The bell tower has a Decorated Gothic spire with three tiers of lucarnes. The south porch is a late mediaeval Perpendicular Gothic addition. It is a Grade I listed building.

In Cow Honeybourne, the former parish church, known as the "Old Church" has a 15th-century Perpendicular Gothic west tower and formerly had an ornate Elizabethan pulpit. The church fell out of use for worship from the 16th to the 19th centuries and was partitioned off into four or five tenements, while pig sties and sheds were built against the outside walls. Apart from the tower, the church was rebuilt in 1861–63 to designs by the Worcester Diocesan Architect W. J. Hopkins. The church has since been made redundant, deconsecrated and converted to two private houses. It is a Grade II listed building.

Honeybourne is in the Diocese of Gloucester. Diocesan boundaries and county boundaries do not align in this part of the country.

== Amenities ==
Honeybourne has two public houses: the Gate Inn and the 13th-century Thatched Tavern. Other amenities include the Ranch caravan park, Indulgence skincare & beauty salon, hairdressers, 2 convenience stores (Co-Op and One Stop), a fish and chip shop, Post Office, Chinese takeaway, Indian takeaway, garage with petrol station, and Honeybourne Pottery. Honeybourne Harriers is one of the most popular football clubs in the area, catering for children from 4 to 18.

Bus service 553 provides a link to Evesham providing six return journeys Mon-Sat. Currently operated by Henshaw's Coaches, from 1st March 2025 the service will be operated by Diamond Bus.

== Education ==
Honeybourne Primary Academy teaches children between the ages of four and 11. Honeybees Nursery takes children between the ages of two and four.

== Railways ==
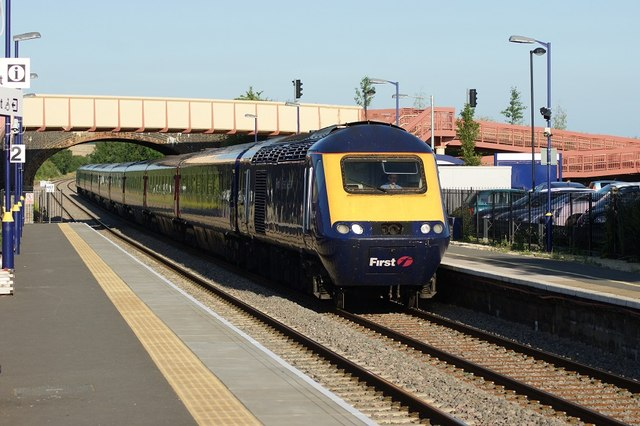
Honeybourne railway station with a British Rail Class 43 (HST)

Great Western Railway (train operating company) serves Honeybourne railway station on the Cotswold Line with direct train services to Worcester Shrub Hill, Oxford and London Paddington.

The Oxford, Worcester and Wolverhampton Railway was built through the parish in the 1840s, and Honeybourne station was opened. The 19th-century railway company Great Western Railway took over the OW&W in 1862 and enlarged Honeybourne station in the 1900s when it built the railway between Stratford-upon-Avon and Cheltenham Spa.

British Railways closed the Honeybourne Line between Stratford and Cheltenham, reduced the OW&W line to single track and 1969 closed Honeybourne station. However, with increased use of the Cotswold Line, the station was re-opened in 1981 with a single platform; work completed in 2011 saw this part of the line restored to double track and Network Rail enlarged Honeybourne to two platforms with a rather large, wheelchair-accessible bridge.

A report prepared for Stratford-on-Avon District Council in 2012 stated that there was a good business case for restoring the Stratford-Cotswolds link line.

In July 2015, a drunken squirrel caused hundreds of pounds' worth of damage to the Honeybourne Railway Club, when it emptied an entire barrel of beer onto the floor and knocked glasses and bottles from the shelves.

== General and cited sources ==
- Pevsner, Nikolaus (1968). The Buildings of England: Worcestershire. Harmondsworth: Penguin Books. pp. 119, 125.
