= Long Marston railway station =

Former railway station in Warwickshire, England

Long Marston
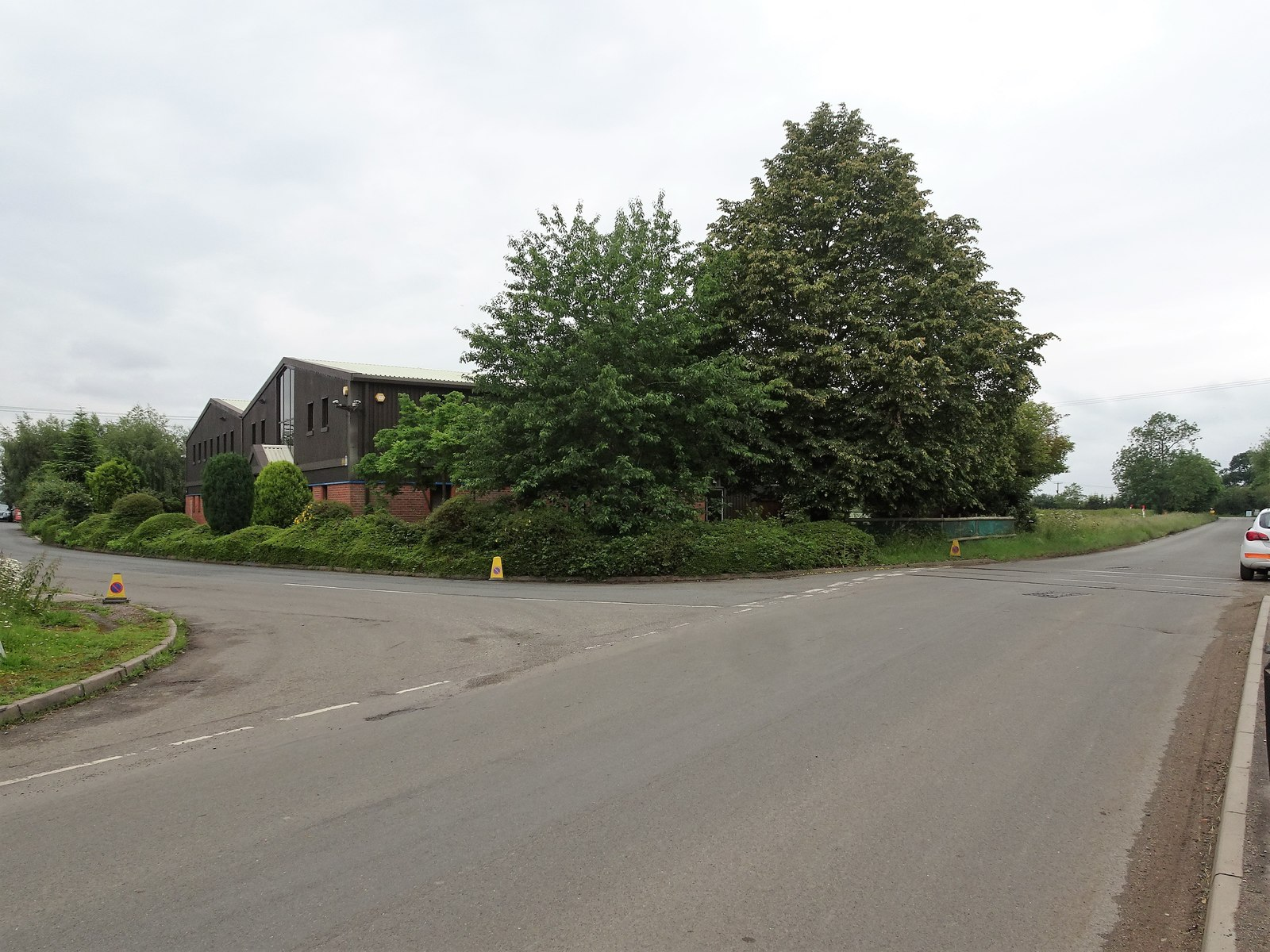
- The site of the station in 2019

General information
- Location: Long Marston, Stratford-on-Avon, England
- Coordinates: 52.1288°N 1.7751°W
- Grid reference: SP155478
- Platforms: 2 (from 1908; previously 1)

Other information
- Status: Disused

History
- Opened: 12 July 1859; 166 years ago
- Closed: 3 January 1966; 60 years ago
- Original company: Oxford, Worcester and Wolverhampton Railway
- Pre-grouping: Great Western Railway
- Post-grouping: Great Western Railway, Western Region of British Railways

Key dates
- May 1908; 118 years ago: Second platform opened
Location

Long Marston railway station served the village of Long Marston, in Warwickshire, England, between 1859 and 1966. It was a stop on the Great Western Railway (GWR) line between Stratford-upon-Avon and Honeybourne, which became part of the new main line between Birmingham and Cheltenham.

== History ==
The Oxford, Worcester and Wolverhampton Railway (OW&WR) opened a single track branch line from Honeybourne to Stratford on 12 July 1859; Long Marston station was opened just south of the village. The OW&WR became part of the GWR, which upgraded the route into a double-tracked main line in 1908.

In 1966, British Rail withdrew passenger services from Long Marston station. Freight services continued until 1976, when the track between Long Marston and Stratford was lifted.

Disused railways
Honeybourne; Line closed, station open	Great Western Railway; Honeybourne Line	Milcote; Line and station closed
Preceding station	Heritage railways	Following station
Proposed extension
Honeybourne towards Cheltenham Race Course	Gloucestershire Warwickshire Railway	Milcote towards Stratford-upon-Avon

== The site today ==
The track between Honeybourne and Long Marston remains open for non-passenger trains to and from Long Marston depot, which was built as a Ministry of Defence (MoD) facility known as Long Marston Central Engineering Park.

== Avon Rail Link proposal ==
The Shakespeare Line Promotion Group is promoting a scheme to reopen the 9 miles (14 km) of line south of Stratford-upon-Avon to Honeybourne, where it would link to the Cotswold Line. Named the Avon Rail Link, the scheme is supported as a freight diversionary route by DB Schenker. This would make Stratford-upon-Avon a through station once again, with improved connections to the south and open up the possibility of direct services to Oxford and Worcester, via Evesham. The scheme faces local opposition; however, there is a good business case for a Stratford-Cotswolds link.

== Rolling stock storage depot ==
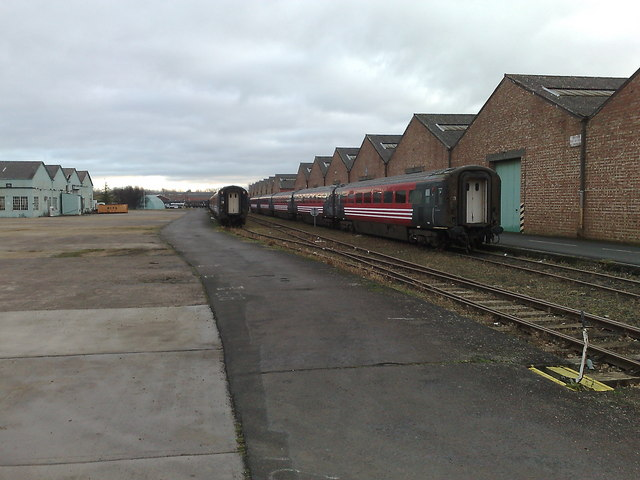
The storage depot and sidings

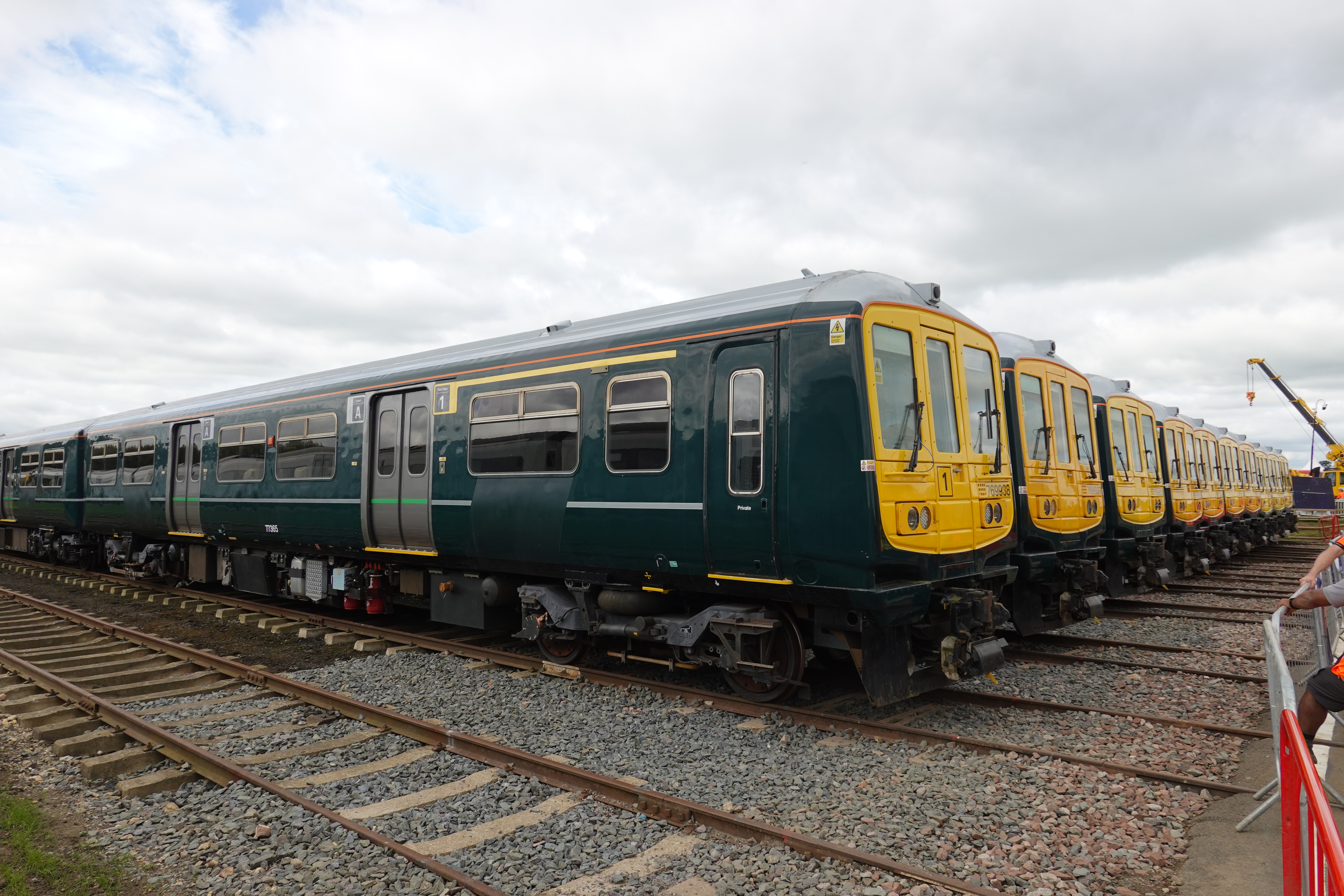
Class 769 units stored at Long Marston in 2026

Since the privatisation of British Rail in the mid-1990s, rolling stock companies (ROSCOs) have used it to store out-of-lease rolling stock. The site is secure and secluded, to minimise the risk of vandalism.

In June 2021, Porterbrook purchased the site both for long-term rolling stock storage and to develop its Rail Innovation Centre. It is building an electrified continuous testing loop, which is due to commence operations in early 2026.

=== Military railway ===
In 2014, it was announced that a volunteer-run working military railway would be created on the site of the former MoD depot. The Long Marston Military Railway project sought to keep alive military railway skills, such as the rerailing of trains, locomotive driving and track laying. This followe the disbanding of the British Army's last railway unit, the Royal Logistic Corps 275 Railway Squadron, in March 2014 as a result of Government defence cuts. The 79 Railway Squadron had been disbanded in 2012.

A Military Railfest was planned for 6–10 May 2015 and was expected to include about 20 former army locomotives. The project had been using the shed vacated by the Stratford on Avon and Broadway Railway in 2011.

In March 2015, it was reported that the project had collapsed and that the majority of the site would be redeveloped for housing. Sidings were retained for the storage of the former London Underground's District line D78 Stock, for Vivarail's conversion into Class 230 diesel multiple units.
