= Pebworth Halt railway station =

Disused railway station in Pebworth, Worcestershire

Coordinates: 52.1106°N 1.7930°W

Pebworth Halt

General information
- Location: Pebworth, Worcestershire; England
- Platforms: 2

Other information
- Status: Disused

History
- Original company: Great Western Railway
- Post-grouping: Great Western Railway

Key dates
- 6 September 1937: Opened
- 3 January 1966: Closed
Location

Pebworth Halt railway station served the village of Pebworth, Worcestershire, England from 1937 to 1966 on the Gloucestershire Warwickshire Railway.

== History ==
The station opened on 6 September 1937 by the Great Western Railway. It only cost £430 to build and open. In September 1945 the station had recorded a mere 876 passengers. The station closed on 3 January 1966.

Preceding station	Historical railways	Following station
Honeybourne; Line and station open	Gloucestershire Warwickshire Railway	Broad Marston Halt; Line open, station closed
