= Clifford Chambers =

Village in Warwickshire, England

Coordinates: 52.16765°N 1.71264°W

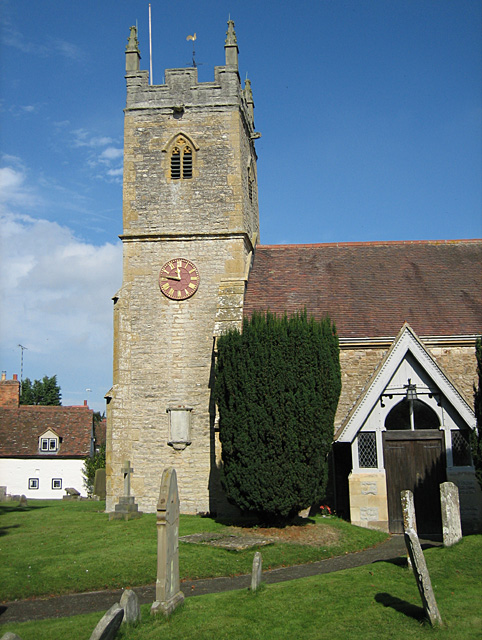
- St Helens, the parish church

- Location within Warwickshire
- Population: 418 (2001)
- Civil parish: Clifford Chambers and Milcote
- District: Stratford-on-Avon
- Shire county: Warwickshire
- Region: West Midlands
- Country: England
- Sovereign state: United Kingdom
- Post town: STRATFORD-UPON-AVON
- Postcode district: CV37
- Dialling code: 01789
- Police: Warwickshire
- Fire: Warwickshire
- Ambulance: West Midlands
- UK Parliament: Stratford-on-Avon

Clifford Chambers is a village and former civil parish two miles south of Stratford-upon-Avon town centre, in Warwickshire, England. It is on the B4632 road and one mile south of the A3400. It consists of 150 houses and the population of the parish in the 2001 census was 418. Until 1 April 2004 the village was in its own parish but it is now part of the parish of Clifford Chambers and Milcote. The village was in Gloucestershire until 1931. The River Stour runs along the north-eastern edge of the village.

== History ==
The moated manor house belonged to the Rainsford family from 1562 until the English Civil War. Around the turn of the seventeenth century, during the tenure of Sir Henry Rainsford and his wife Anne, the house was visited by well-known poets, including Michael Drayton, Ben Jonson and, albeit not documented, William Shakespeare. Drayton viewed Anne as his muse, writing poems such as "Idea. The Shepheards Garland as Poemes Lyrick and pastorall" in her honour. Drayton also eulogized Sir Henry Rainsford in his poem "Upon the Death of his Incomparable Friend, Sir Henry Raynsford Of Clifford." The estate was sequestered during the English Civil War for taking the side of King Charles I, but the owners compounded before selling it. Subsequent generations of Rainsfords were to be found in London, rather than Clifford Chambers.

The manor was remodelled by Edwin Lutyens in 1918, following a fire and the garden design has been attributed to Lutyens and Gertrude Jekyll. Many of the houses were still owned by the occupants of the manor house until after the Second World War. It was the lady of the manor who switched on the village's electricity supply when it was connected to the National Grid in 1933. During the Second World War children from the Roman Catholic school in Edgbaston, Birmingham were evacuated to the village. Shortly after the war deep-texture furnishing fabric was developed by Tibor Reich at Clifford Chambers mill.

== The village today ==
Since 1996 the village has been the headquarters of the Hosking Houses Trust, a charity for female writers set up by Sarah Hosking (arts administrator) . The Shire Horse centre, one mile from the village, closed soon after the foot & mouth crisis and is now a business park. Another local business is Stratford Garden Centre, lying just half a mile outside the village. The village also has one pub (The New Inn Hotel and Restaurant) and a social club. The Shakespearean and Hollywood actor Sir Ben Kingsley is a former resident of the village.
