= Honeybourne railway station =

Railway station in Worcestershire, England

Honeybourne
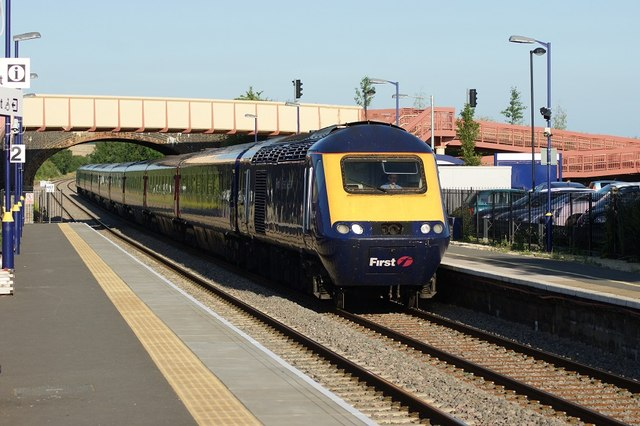
- FGW 43164 leads a Paddington to Hereford service through Platform 1 in July 2013.

General information
- Location: Honeybourne, Wychavon; England
- Coordinates: 52.101°N 1.835°W
- Grid reference: SP114448
- Managed by: Great Western Railway
- Platforms: 2

Other information
- Station code: HYB
- Classification: DfT category F2

History
- Original company: Oxford, Worcester and Wolverhampton Railway
- Pre-grouping: Great Western Railway
- Post-grouping: Great Western Railway

Key dates
- 4 June 1853: Opened
- 5 May 1969: Closed
- 22 May 1981: Reopened

Passengers
- 2020/21: ▼16,280
- 2021/22: ▲64,078
- 2022/23: ▲85,768
- 2023/24: ▲92,244
- 2024/25: ▲0.113 million
Location
Notes
- Passenger statistics from the Office of Rail and Road

Honeybourne railway station serves the village of Honeybourne in Worcestershire, England. Opened in 1853, it is on the Cotswold Line and was formerly a busy junction with five platform faces, also serving trains on the Great Western Railway's Honeybourne Line between Cheltenham Spa and Stratford-upon-Avon, which formed part of a strategic route between the West Midlands and the West of England. The station was closed in 1969, after the withdrawal of stopping services to Stratford-upon Avon and closure to freight.

Honeybourne was reopened in 1981, in connection with residential development near the station. The Heritage Gloucestershire Warwickshire Railway has reopened a 14-mile (23 km) section of the 22-mile (35 km)-long Honeybourne Line, between Broadway and Cheltenham Racecourse, and hopes to extend its operations a further 5 miles (8.0 km), to Honeybourne, for which Network Rail has made passive provision. The station is 101 miles 60 chains (163.8 km) measured from London Paddington, and is between Moreton-in-Marsh and Evesham.

== History ==
=== Opening and expansion ===
Honeybourne was one of the original stations opened on 4 June 1853 by the Oxford, Worcester and Wolverhampton Railway (OWW) on the long section between Evesham and Wolvercot Junction (north of Oxford). The OWW became the West Midland Railway in 1860, which in turn amalgamated with the Great Western Railway in 1863. Initially single track, the line between Campden to Evesham, including Honeybourne, was doubled on 20 March 1855. The station became a junction on 12 July 1859 with the opening of a 9 1/2-mile (15.3 km) link to Stratford-upon-Avon, which was continued south to Cheltenham by 1 August 1906. The single track from Honeybourne to Stratford was doubled on 9 February 1908, shortly before the route took on main line status on 1 July 1908 with the routing of express passenger trains between Birmingham Snow Hill and Bristol Temple Meads via the newly opened North Warwickshire Line.

The original station layout at Honeybourne was basic: a two platform station on the Oxford to Worcester line which was connected to the single track line to Stratford via a double junction from which an east to north curve forked to the northeast. The curve, which was later known as the "East Loop", was controlled by a single signalbox that was one of the first in the country to have an interlocking frame mechanically preventing conflicting signal and point levers being pulled. North of the platforms was a small goods yard comprising two sidings and a small engine shed, which was used to stable engines that banked goods trains over the steep incline to Campden.

A 40-foot (12 m) turntable was added after the opening of the link to Stratford, as it was a requirement of the Board of Trade to have one at both ends of a branch line. This was probably taken up in 1870 with the construction of a new engine shed, which itself only lasted until 1907 when it was demolished to enlarge the goods yard. Its replacement built in 1909 was burnt down on 13 September 1911 and was not rebuilt, with only a small coaling platform being provided. A Brunel-designed "chalet" type station building was provided on the "Down" platform, but this only lasted until 1872.

With the opening of the Cheltenham line as far as Broadway on 1 August 1904, the lines through Honeybourne were quadrupled and two loops were laid. As at one or two other GWR locations, the direction naming here is semi-notional: the OWWR main line was considered to run south (London/Oxford) to north (Worcester), with Cheltenham to the west and Stratford-upon-Avon to the east, despite the former actually running closer to E-W and the latter closer to N-S. The "West Loop" thus ran from the station to the Cheltenham line, whilst the "South Loop" connected the Stratford and Oxford lines. Four signalboxes, one at each end of the loops, controlled traffic. The new lines through the station were served by four platform faces: a "Down" main (567 ft or 173 m), an "Up" relief (500 ft or 150 m) and an island platform (also 500 ft or 150 m) which served the Worcester line. The old "Up" platform building was replaced by large waiting facilities and a refreshment room; a waiting shelter was provided on the "Up" branch platform and a footbridge spanned the four tracks. Two further signalboxes were provided: Station North box opened at the Worcester end on the north side of the Up main line in 1909 to control a goods loop which ran parallel with the main line, and Station South box was positioned south of the main line to control the London end of the station plus a siding and loop line behind the box.

=== Decline and closure ===
Honeybourne generated very little traffic of its own and the agricultural produce that it did handle was dwarfed by interchange returns. Traffic picked up during the Second World War when the station's geographical location at the crossroads of several routes meant that it was very busy. A new yard was opened at Honeybourne West Loop in 1960 to handle iron ore flows which were re-routed via the Stratford to Cheltenham line to relieve the Great Western Main Line. In the same year, the Honeybourne to Cheltenham local service was withdrawn, although through express trains such as the Cornishman continued to use the line until 9 September 1962 after when they were worked via Bromsgrove. A gradual rundown of goods facilities at Honeybourne began on 1 June 1964 with the closure of the station to freight, after which the majority of the sidings were abolished and the goods loops were taken out of use. Station North box was closed on 4 April 1965, with the south loop and South Loop box following on 13 October 1965. The West Loop box was switched out on 31 January 1966 and only used when required until 1970, The North Loop signalbox had already closed in March 1933, when its junction came under the control of Station South box.

The station became unstaffed from 16 January 1967. It closed to passengers on 5 May 1969, the last day of regular passenger services between Stratford and Evesham via Honeybourne. This rendered the east loop redundant and it was taken out of use on 3 November 1970. East Loop box closed permanently, but West Loop box and three long sidings were brought back into use to enable goods trains from Worcester to reach Long Marston. The layout was cut back further in 1971 with the rationalisation of the Oxford to Worcester line and singling of the section between Evesham and Moreton-in-Marsh on 20 September, after which Honeybourne (Station) South box became a ground frame controlling the junction between the main line and double track to West Loop box. The Stratford-Cheltenham line was used for a modest amount of freight until 1976 when a derailment south of Toddington prompted the closure of the line except for a section between the West Loop sidings and Long Marston. This section was singled on 24 March 1980 when West Loop box was also closed. The following year a new chord was laid on the formation of the former east loop which allowed the reversal of trains at West Loop to be discontinued and the sidings there to be closed, followed by the replacement of Honeybourne (Station) South box with a 2-lever frame on 7 March 1983.

== Reopening ==
Residential development around Honeybourne partly due to its proximity to Long Lartin prison, as well as pressure from the Cotswold Line Promotion Group, led to the ceremonial reopening of the station on 22 May 1981, with the first public services running two days later. The southernmost of Honeybourne's five former platforms was reopened, in what was British Rail's 66th station reopening since 1966. Passenger facilities were very basic and consisted only of a Portakabin and a Portaloo.

On the night of 15 May 1985, the reinstated east loop was used to stable the Royal Train which was being used by Prince Philip while visiting the area. In 1981, the structure of Honeybourne North box was donated to the heritage railway by a local resident who had erected it in his garden as a shed. It was subsequently reused at Toddington as a classroom for the Signal & Telegraph department.

Until 22 August 2011 only a single platform face was in use at the station. However, as part of a £67 million project to redouble the Cotswold Line between Evesham and Moreton-in-Marsh and Ascott-under-Wychwood to Charlbury, a second platform face on a rebuilt island platform was brought into operation for services on the reinstated "Up" line. The new platform, which has an operational length of 140 m (150 yd), is numbered "2", whilst the original platform is renumbered "1". Passive provision was made for the eventual arrival of the heritage Gloucestershire Warwickshire Railway in the shape of a third platform face on the former "Down" branch side of the new platform. The works also involved relocating the connection to and from the branch to Long Marston to the Evesham side of the station together with a trailing crossover and laying three new sidings for track machines formerly stabled at Moreton-in-Marsh. The first steam through the new platform 2 took place on 17 September 2011 when GWR steam locomotive 5043 Earl of Mount Edgcumbe hauled a Vintage Trains Cathedrals Express from Tyseley to London Paddington via Worcester Shrub Hill and Oxford, the first time a steam train had run on the "Up" line for 40 years.

== Facilities ==
The station has a ticket machine, a car park, cycle spaces and benches. Both platforms have step-free access. There are help points available as the station is not staffed.

== Passenger volume ==
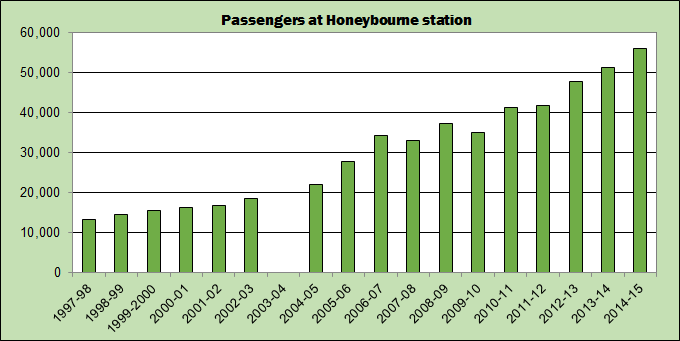
Bar chart of ORR annual passenger estimates from 1997–98 to 2014–15

By the turn of the 21st century, passenger numbers at Honeybourne were slowly increasing: from an estimated 13,360 in 1997–98 to an estimated 22,077 in 2004–05. Since then the number of passengers using the station has increased rapidly, and the estimated total for 2018–19 was more than 66,000. Estimated passenger totals have risen by 78% in 10 years and trebled in 14 years.

Passenger volume at Honeybourne
	2004–05	2005–06	2006–07	2007–08	2008–09	2009–10	2010–11	2011–12	2012–13	2013–14	2014–15	2015–16	2016–17	2017–18	2018–19	2019–20	2020–21	2021–22	2022–23	2023–24	2024–25
Entries and exits	22,077	27,752	34,281	33,127	37,350	35,052	41,446	41,834	47,788	51,400	56,178	57,978	59,496	61,858	66,612	71,830	16,280	64,078	85,768	92,244	113,180

The statistics cover twelve month periods that start in April.

== Services ==
Passenger services at Honeybourne are operated by Great Western Railway. There is a broadly hourly service every day, westbound to Worcester Shrub Hill, Great Malvern and Hereford; and eastbound to London Paddington.

Preceding station	National Rail	Following station
Evesham	Great Western Railway; Hereford - Oxford	Moreton-in-Marsh
Historical railways
Littleton and Badsey; Line open, station closed	Great Western Railway; Oxford, Worcester and Wolverhampton Railway	Mickleton Halt; Line open, station closed
Disused railways
Weston-sub-Edge; Line and station closed	Great Western Railway; Honeybourne Line	Pebworth Halt; Line open, station closed
Preceding station	Heritage railways	Following station
Proposed extension
Weston-sub-Edge towards Cheltenham Race Course	Gloucestershire Warwickshire Railway	Long Marston towards Stratford-upon-Avon

== Future plans ==
The track to the east remains as a link to the large ex-Ministry of Defence depot at Long Marston. The Stratford on Avon and Broadway Railway Society aimed to adopt this stretch as a heritage railway and restore the line to Stratford. The society has since been dissolved, however, leaving any heritage connection to be made by the Gloucestershire Warwickshire Railway.

The Shakespeare Line Promotion Group is promoting a scheme to reinstate the 9-mile (14 km) "missing Link" between Honeybourne and Stratford. Called the "Avon Rail Link", the scheme (supported as a freight diversionary route by DB Schenker) would make Stratford-upon-Avon railway station a through station once again with improved connections to the Cotswolds and the South. The scheme faces local opposition. There is, however, a good business case for Stratford-Cotswolds link. In 2017, Warwickshire County Council commissioned a study into reopening the line. An expected 5,900 new homes in the Long Marston area could mean the rebuilding of a new parkway station there.

== Bibliography ==
- Abbott, James (August 2011). "Track doubling projects restore capacity". Modern Railways. Vol. 68, no. 755.
- Awdry, Christopher (1990). Encyclopaedia of British Railway Companies. Sparkford: Patrick Stephens Ltd. ISBN 1-8526-0049-7. OCLC 19514063. CN 8983.
- Baker, Audie (1994). The Stratford on Avon to Cheltenham Railway. Grasscroft: Irwell Press. ISBN 978-1-871608-62-5.
- Butt, R. V. J. (October 1995). The Directory of Railway Stations: details every public and private passenger station, halt, platform and stopping place, past and present (1st ed.). Sparkford: Patrick Stephens Ltd. ISBN 978-1-85260-508-7. OCLC 60251199. OL 11956311M.
- Bridge, Mike (November 2011). "Trackwatch". Modern Railways. Vol. 68, no. 758.
- Clinker, CR (1978). Clinker's Register of Closed Passenger Stations and Goods Depots in England, Scotland and Wales 1830–1977. Bristol: Avon-Anglia Publications & Services. ISBN 0-905466-19-5.
- Jenkins, Stanley C; Quayle, HL (1977). The Oxford, Worcester & Wolverhampton Railway. The Oakwood Library of Railway History. Blandford: Oakwood Press. OL40.
- Maggs, Colin G; Nicholson, Peter (1985). The Honeybourne Line: The continuing story of the Cheltenham to Honeybourne and Stratford upon Avon Railway. Cheltenham: Line One Publishing. ISBN 978-0-907036-12-8.
- Mitchell, Victor E.; Smith, Keith (August 2005) [1998]. Stratford upon Avon to Cheltenham. Country Railway Routes. Midhurst: Middleton Press. ISBN 1-901706-25-7.
- Oppitz, Leslie (2004) [2002]. Lost Railways of Herefordshire & Worcestershire. Newbury: Countryside Books. ISBN 978-1-85306-754-9.
- Piggott, Nick, ed. (November 2011). "First steam through 'new' Honeybourne". The Railway Magazine. Vol. 157, no. 1327.
- Potts, C.R. (1985). A Historical Survey of selected Great Western Railway stations. Vol. 4. Poole: Oxford Publishing Co. ISBN 978-0-86093-191-1.
- Siviter, Roger (2003) [1997]. The Gloucestershire Warwickshire Railway. Kettering: Past & Present Publishing. ISBN 1-85895-208-5.
- Stretton, John (October 2011). "The tracks of our years". The Railway Magazine. Vol. 157, no. 1326.
- Whitehouse, John; Dowling, Geoff (1994) [1987]. The West Midlands. British Railways Past and Present. Wadenhoe: Past & Present Publishing. ISBN 1-85895-075-9.
- Yorke, Stan (2009). Lost Railways of Gloucestershire. Newbury: Countryside Books. ISBN 978-1-84674-163-0.
