= Stratford-upon-Avon railway station =

Railway station in Warwickshire, England

Coordinates: 52.194°N 1.716°W

Stratford-upon-Avon
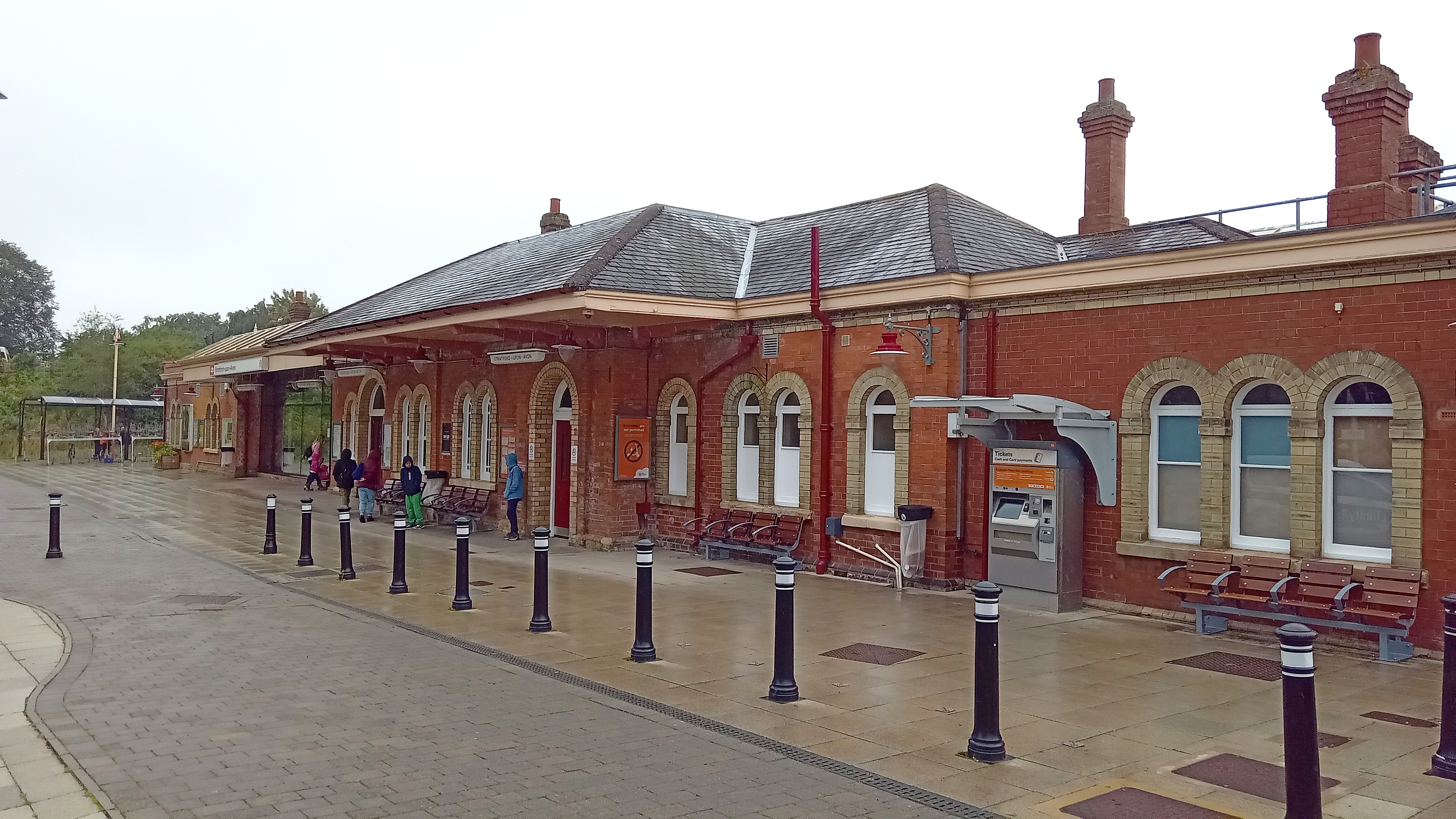
- Station building in 2023.

General information
- Location: Stratford-upon-Avon, Stratford-on-Avon; England
- Grid reference: SP194551
- Manager: West Midlands Railway
- Platforms: 3

Other information
- Station code: SAV
- Classification: DfT category D

Key dates
- 24 July 1861: Opened

Passengers
- 2021/22: ▲0.575 million
- 2022/23: ▲0.671 million
- 2023/24: ▲0.760 million
- 2024/25: ▲0.841 million
- 2025/26: ▲0.909 million
Location
Notes
- Passenger statistics from the Office of Rail and Road

Stratford-upon-Avon railway station is the southern terminus of the North Warwickshire Line and Leamington–Stratford line, serving the market town of Stratford-upon-Avon in Warwickshire, England. The station is operated and served by West Midlands Trains (WMT), with Chiltern Railways also running some services.

Prior to August 1976, the station offered direct links to the south of the region via the Cotswold Line; however, the derailment of a freight train prompted British Rail to withdraw the link.

== History ==
The first line to reach Stratford-upon-Avon was the Oxford, Worcester and Wolverhampton Railway branch from Honeybourne to the south, which opened a station at Sanctus Street on 12 July 1859. This was soon followed by the Stratford on Avon Railway branch from Hatton to the north, which opened on 9 October 1860, with a station on Birmingham Road. Both branches were initially unconnected, with separate termini, but an agreement was soon made to join the branches, with a single station at the present site, which opened on 24 July 1861, on this date the former Stratford on Avon Railway terminus on Birmingham Road became a goods station. Both branches later came under the control of Great Western Railway (GWR).

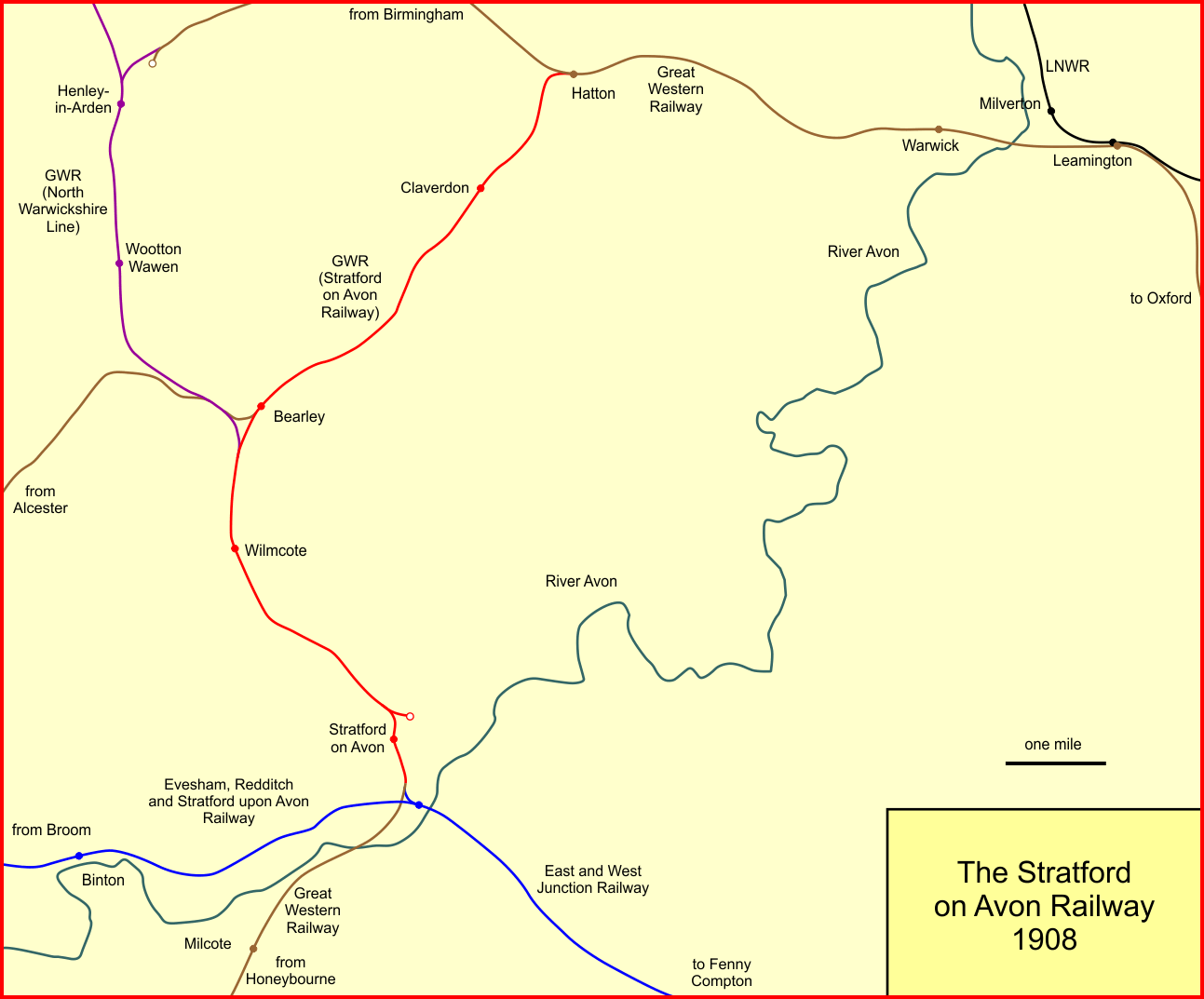
Map of railways in the area of Stratford-upon-Avon in 1908.

In 1908, Great Western Railway opened the North Warwickshire Line which incorporated parts of the two original branch lines into a new main line from Birmingham to Cheltenham. This placed Stratford-upon-Avon on the main line, which prompted the expansion of the station with a third platform being added.

Through services to Gloucester were withdrawn in 1968, and passenger services south of Stratford-upon-Avon ceased altogether on 5 May 1969. As a result, there were no longer services to Honeybourne, Evesham and Worcester Foregate Street. The line remained open to freight traffic until a derailment prompted British Rail to close the line entirely in 1976. Consequently, Stratford-upon-Avon became the southern terminus of the line from Birmingham and Hatton.

Between 1873 and 1952, Stratford-upon-Avon was also served by Stratford Old Town railway station on the Stratford-upon-Avon and Midland Junction Railway (SMJR).

A new parkway station was opened to the north of the town next to the A46 road on 19 May 2013. It was proposed that building the station would ease congestion, as passengers from outside the area were no longer required to drive into the town to access rail transport. In addition, services between Birmingham and Stratford-upon-Avon were increased from hourly to half-hourly in conjunction with the opening of the station.

On 26 November 2015, a second footbridge and lifts were built, which gave people with limited mobility the ability to use all of the platforms. It was also announced that a new café, waiting room and retail area were being planned. On 18 March 2019, a refurbishment of the station was started, which was funded by the Department for Transport and Warwickshire County Council. The refurbishment consisted of rebuilding the ticket hall, improving the seating areas, upgrading the toilet facilities and implementing bike racks.

== Facilities ==
The station has a ticket office located next to the station entrance on platform one which can usually be accessed on each day of the week with varying opening hours. Tickets can be also be purchased from the self-service machine outside the ticket office which accepts card payments. If a person wishes to pay by cash or voucher when the ticket office is closed, they are advised to do so by asking a senior conductor or train manager.

Step-free access is available between the platforms by using the lifts on the footbridge. Station staff are able to provide assistance whilst the ticket office is open. Outside of these hours, information is available from the help points located on both platforms. Cycle parking is also available.

== Services ==
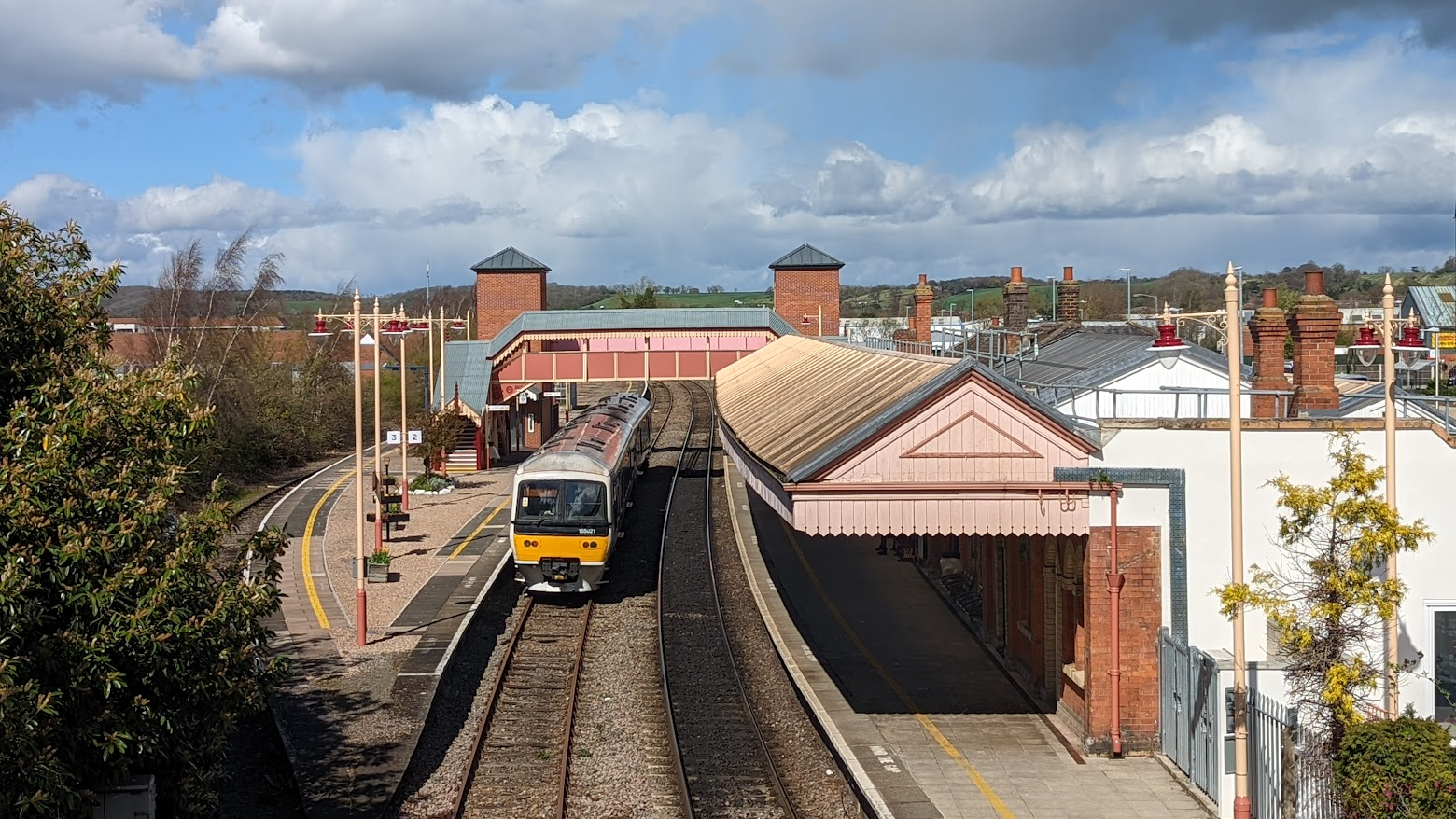
Station from a nearby footbridge. A Class 165 sits in platform 2.

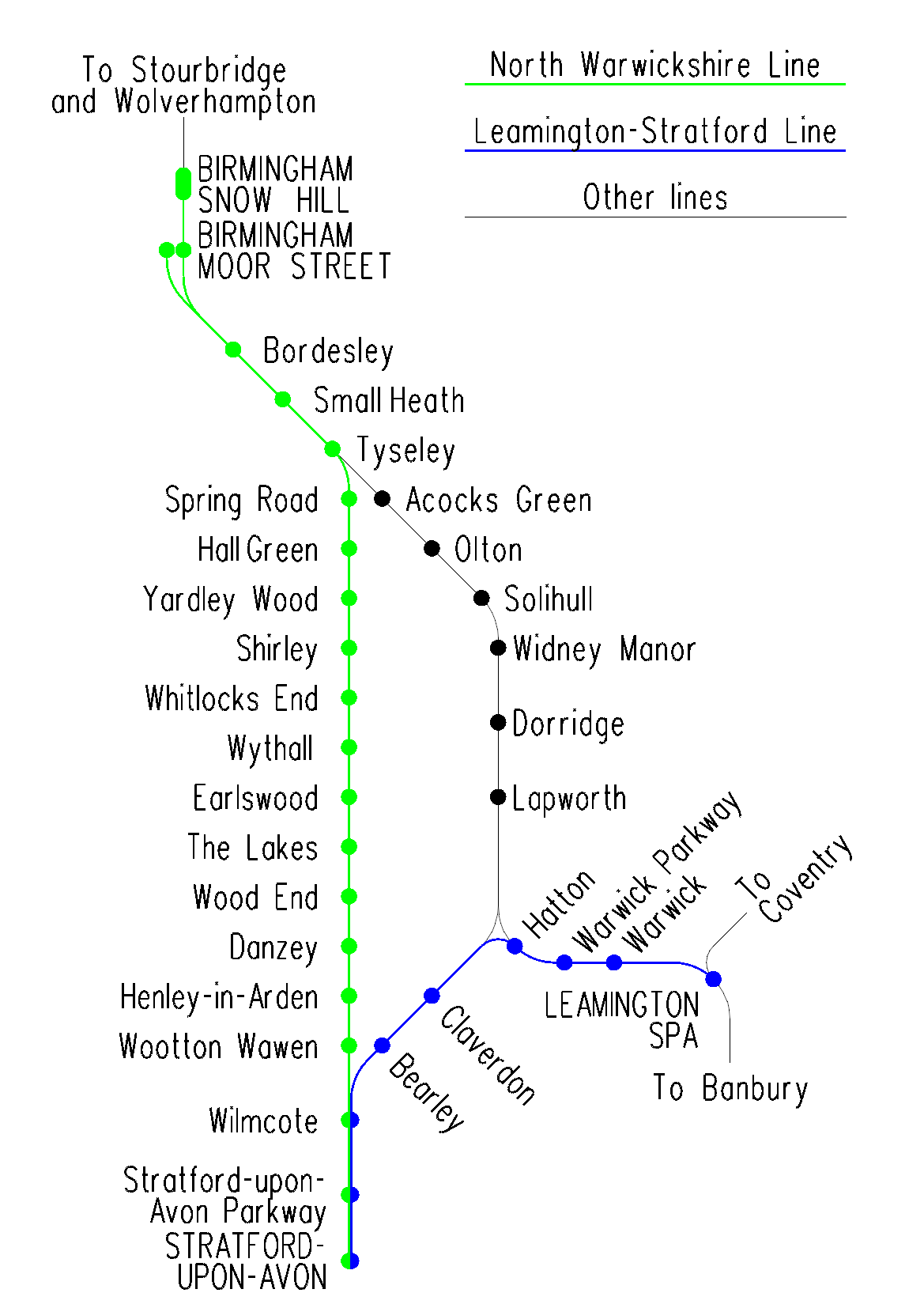
Railway lines from Stratford-upon-Avon.

=== West Midlands Railway ===
West Midlands Railway provide twice-hourly weekday and Saturday services from Stratford-upon-Avon to Birmingham Snow Hill. These services continue to Kidderminster or Worcester Foregate Street. Services that run via Shirley along the North Warwickshire Line terminate at Kidderminster, whereas those that run via Solihull terminate at Worcester Foregate Street. Later in the day, the frequency of services is reduced to once-hourly with trains only running via Shirley to Birmingham Snow Hill or Worcester Shrub Hill. The last service of the day does not stop at any stations between Wilmcote and Birmingham Moor Street.

On Sunday, there is a once-hourly service to Worcester Foregate Street or Worcester Shrub Hill via Shirley and Birmingham Snow Hill. No services run via Solihull.

=== Chiltern Railways ===
Chiltern Railways provide a single service every two to three hours from Stratford-upon-Avon to Leamington Spa via Hatton along the Leamington-Stratford line. Before the COVID-19 pandemic, services regularly extended to London Marylebone, but commuters must now access a connecting service at another station, such as Dorridge or Leamington Spa. Marylebone services are expected to return twice daily from December 2026. The last service of the day terminates at Banbury.

On Sunday, the frequency of services remains the same; however, they are only available from late morning to late evening.

=== Vintage Trains ===
A steam train service to Birmingham Snow Hill, occasionally serving Henley-in-Arden, is operated by Vintage Trains between July and September.

Preceding station	National Rail	Following station
Stratford-upon-Avon Parkway	West Midlands Railway; Birmingham–Stratford line	Terminus
Stratford-upon-Avon Parkway	Chiltern Railways; Leamington–Stratford line	Terminus
	Heritage railways	
Henley-in-Arden	Vintage Trains; The Shakespeare Express; July–September	Terminus
Historical railways
Wilmcote	Thames Trains; Cherwell Valley line	Terminus
Disused railways
Wilmcote	Great Western Railway; Honeybourne Line	Stratford-upon-Avon Racecourse; Line and station closed
Terminus	SMJR; East and West Junction Railway	Stratford Old Town; Line and station closed
Preceding station	Heritage railways	Following station
Proposed extension
Terminus	Gloucestershire Warwickshire Railway	Stratford-upon-Avon Racecourse Platform towards Cheltenham Race Course

== Stratford-Honeybourne line ==
The Shakespeare Line Promotion Group attempted to promote a scheme to reopen the 6 miles (10 km) of line to the south of Stratford-upon-Avon, where it would link to the Cotswold Line at Honeybourne. The scheme (supported as a freight diversionary route by DB Schenker) would make Stratford a through station once again, with improved connections to the south of the region. It would open up the possibility of direct services towards London Paddington, via Oxford, and also significantly faster services to Worcester, via Evesham.

The scheme has been deemed economically beneficial in the long-term, being supported by former Prime Minister David Cameron and Network Rail. It has also been overwhelmingly supported by the local community, consisting of rail users and local businesses; however, the district council have opposed the scheme due to financial costs.

In November 2020, it was announced that the scheme had been approved for up to £50,000 funding by the Department for Transport (DfT) under the second round of the Restoring your Railway Fund. However, in June 2022, it was announced that the government had rejected the case to reopen the line.

== Criticism ==
The level of service provided by Chiltern Railways has faced frequent criticism. Much of this has been directed towards the lack of connections to Leamington Spa, which is a key transport hub that connects to many parts of the country that cannot otherwise be accessed from Stratford-upon-Avon, including London, Manchester, Sheffield, Reading, Oxford, and Bournemouth. Furthermore, the company has faced criticism for withdrawing the vast majority of its direct services to London Marylebone.

In 2019, the RSC described the service as “woefully inadequate” for an international tourist destination. The MP for Stratford-on-Avon, Manuela Perteghella, has also raised concerns in the House of Commons.

Another issue that has been noted is the absence of services to Coventry and Birmingham International. While these destinations can be accessed from Leamington Spa, the limited service frequency restricts the viability of this route for passengers. It has also been noted that the town struggles with frequent road congestion, which is exacerbated by limited public transport options in the area and below average rail usage by visitors.

== See also ==
- Leamington-Stratford line
- North Warwickshire Line
