= List of hills of Gloucestershire =

This is a list of hills in Gloucestershire. Many of these hills are important historical, archaeological and nature conservation sites, as well as popular hiking and tourist destinations in the county of Gloucestershire in southern England.

== Colour key ==
Class	Prominence
Marilyns	150 – 599 m
HuMPs	100 – 149 m
TuMPs	30 – 99 m
Unclassified	0 – 29 m

The table is colour-coded based on the classification or "listing" of the hill. The types that occur in Gloucestershire are Marilyns, HuMPs and TuMPs, listings based on topographical prominence. "Prominence" correlates strongly with the subjective significance of a summit. Peaks with low prominences are either subsidiary tops of a higher summit or relatively insignificant independent summits. Peaks with high prominences tend to be the highest points around and likely to have extraordinary views. A Marilyn is a hill with a prominence of at least 150 metres or about 500 feet. A "HuMP" (the acronym comes from "Hundred Metre Prominence) is a hill with a prominence of at least 100 but less than 150 metres. In this table Marilyns are in beige and HuMPs in lilac. The term "sub-Marilyn" or "sub-HuMP" is used, e.g. in the online Database of British and Irish Hills to indicate hills that fall just below the threshold. To qualify for inclusion, hills must either be 250 metres or higher with a prominence of at least 30 metres, below 250 metres with a prominence of at least 90 metres (the threshold for a sub-HuMP) or be in some other way notable. In this context, "TuMP" is used to connote a hill with a prominence of at least 30 but less than 100 metres. For further information see the Lists of mountains and hills in the British Isles and the individual articles on Marilyns, HuMPs, and TuMPs. By way of contrast, see also the article listing Tumps (a traditional term meaning a hillock, mound, barrow or tumulus).

== List of hills ==
Hill	Height (m)	Prom. (m)	Grid ref.	Class	Parent	Range/Region	Remarks	Image
Cleeve Hill	330	234	SO996246	Marilyn, HuMP, TuMP, Gloucestershire county top (historical and current)	The Wrekin	Cotswolds	Gloucestershire's county top. Highest point of the Cotswolds. Trig point at summit	
Seven Wells Hill	319	121	SP115348	HuMP, TuMP	Cleeve Hill	Cotswolds	Gloucestershire's second highest hill. Summit at base of wall on S side.	
Shenberrow Hill	304	52	SP083333	TuMP	Cleeve Hill	Cotswolds	Summit in field; no feature.	
Roel Hill	301	67	SP054253	TuMP	Cleeve Hill	Cotswolds	Ground at SW corner of covered reservoir compound.	
Birdlip Hill	299	116	SO924141	HuMP, TuMP	Cleeve Hill	Cotswolds	Fields in Birdlip close to B4070 and reservoir. On a raised mound.	
Wistley Hill	298	74	SO983180	TuMP	Cleeve Hill	Cotswolds	Open featureless summit.	
May Hill	296	217	SO695212	Marilyn, HuMP, TuMP	Cleeve Hill	Over Severn	Summit on small knoll in trees, 15m from trig point and 12m S of Jubilee Plaque. National Trust property.	
Leckhampton Hill	295	71	SO948183	TuMP	Cleeve Hill	Cotswolds	Summit at trig point on hillfort ramparts. Just S of Cheltenham.	
Ruardean Hill	290	174	SO634169	Marilyn, HuMP, TuMP	Cleeve Hill	Forest of Dean	Highest point in the Forest of Dean. Summit at site of original flagpole, about 5m from present one. Trig point nearby.	
Upper Coscombe Hill	290	42	SP071296	TuMP	Cleeve Hill	Cotswolds	Summit at junction of field boundaries.	
Painswick Beacon	283	76	SO868120	TuMP	Cleeve Hill	Cotswolds	Summit 25m S of trig point. Hillfort	
High Brotheridge	282	49	SO891138	TuMP	Cleeve Hill	Cotswolds	Open flat summit surrounded by woodland. Site of ancient settlement.	
Nottingham Hill	280	41	SO980283	TuMP	Cleeve Hill	Cotswolds	No summit feature	
Buck Stone	279	145	SO541122	Sub-Marilyn, HuMP, TuMP	Cleeve Hill	Cotswolds		
Edge Hills	279	32	SO662159	TuMP	Ruardean Hill	Forest of Dean	Wooded summit by track NE of compound. Three masts along track.	
Temple Guiting Hill	279	31	SP082287	TuMP	Cleeve Hill	Cotswolds	Open summit.	
Wigpool Common	279	46	SO655192	TuMP	Ruardean Hill	Forest of Dean	Wooded summit and trig point by minor road.	
Langley Hill	274	102	SP008290	HuMP, TuMP	Cleeve Hill	Cotswolds	Obvious summit within 2m of trig point.	
Crickley Hill	273	41	SO930164	TuMP	Cleeve Hill	Cotswolds	Embankment at summit. Location of Crickley Hill Country Park (NT)	
Pen Hill	267	30	SO995124	TuMP	Cleeve Hill	Cotswolds	Trig point on open summit. Nr Colesbourne Park	
Hart Hill	263	84	SO541031	TuMP	Ruardean Hill	Wye Valley	No summit feature. Gd on N side of Windward Ho.	
Scottsquar Hill	256	72	SO837085	TuMP	Cleeve Hill	Cotswolds	No summit feature. Very flat summit area.	
Crawley Hill Hetty Pegler's Tump	251	98	SO789000	Tump, TuMP, Sub-HuMP.	Cleeve Hill	Cotswolds	Mound on summit.	
Wyck Beacon	250	96	SP201207	TuMP, Sub-HuMP.	Cleeve Hill	Cotswolds	Summit on tumulus 7m from trig point.	
Oxenton Hill	223	126	SO973314	HuMP, TuMP	Cleeve Hill	Cotswolds	No summit feature. 19 m SE of trig point.	
Alderton Hill	223	126	SP009345	HuMP, TuMP, subMarilyn.	Cleeve Hill	Cotswolds	No summit feature.	
Robinswood Hill	198	142	SO840150	HuMP, TuMP, subMarilyn.	Cleeve Hill	Cotswolds	No summit feature. Viewing point above Gloucester.	
Churchdown Hill Chosen Hill, Tinker's Hill	155	102	SO880188	HuMP, TuMP	Cleeve Hill	Cotswolds	No summit feature. Gd by fence.	

Notes:

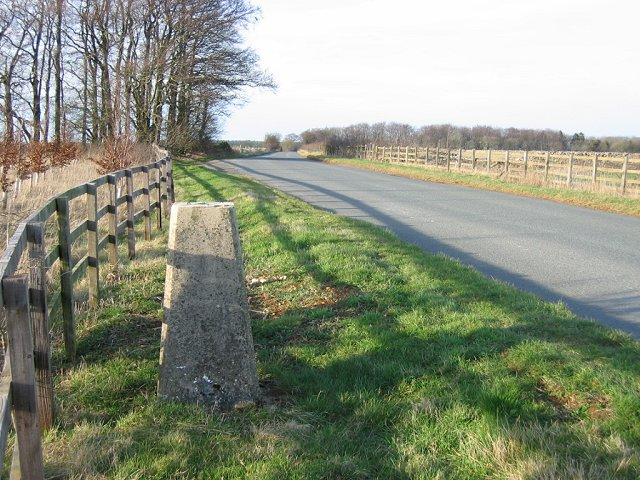
Cutsdean Hill

1. The following high points have not been included for the reasons shown:
- Cutsdean Hill(305 m) only has a prominence of 26 metres.

== See also ==
- List of mountains and hills of the United Kingdom
- List of Marilyns in England
