= Shenberrow Hill =

Hill in Gloucestershire, England

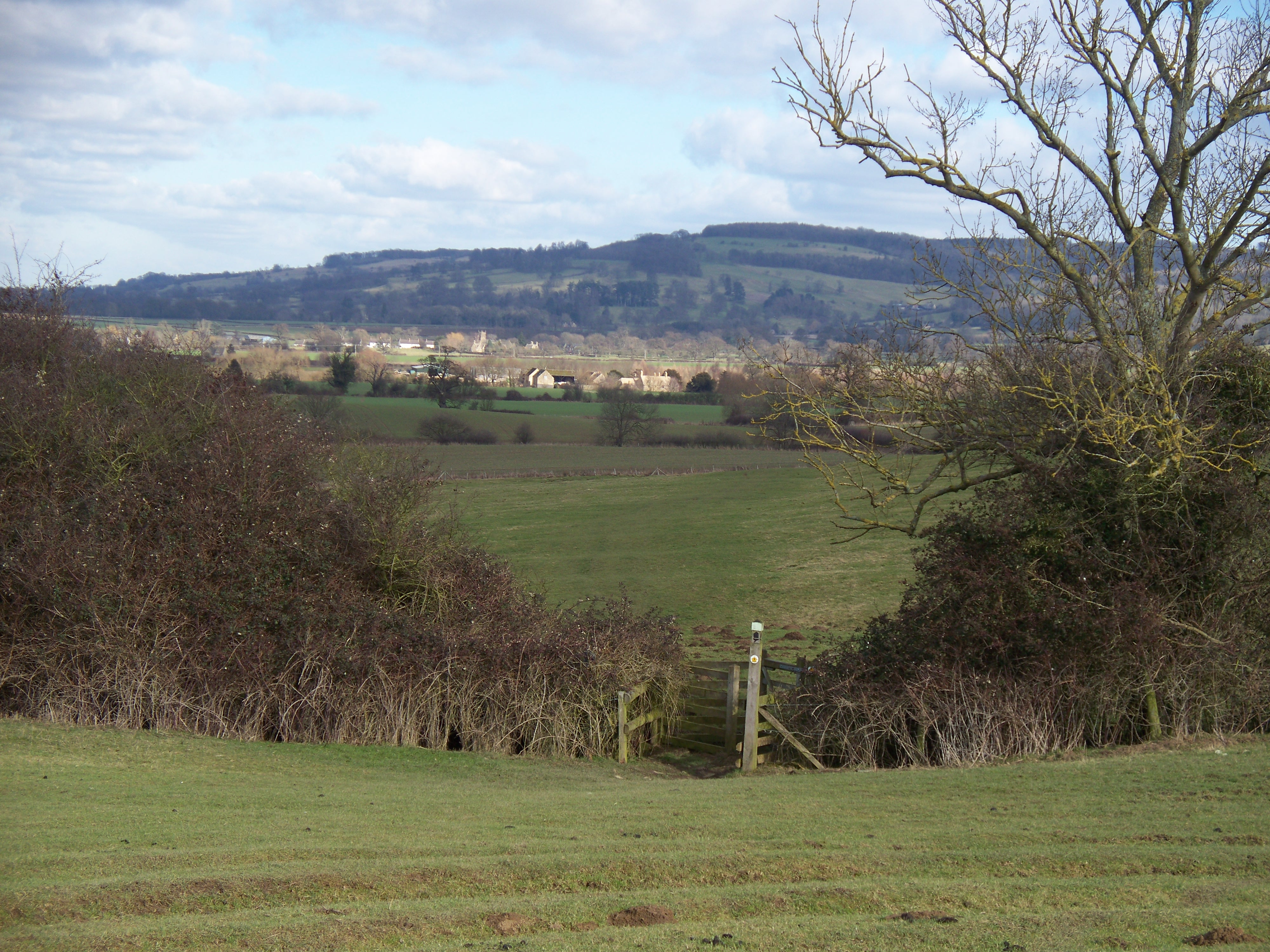
- The Cotswold Way with Shenberrow in the background

Highest point
- Elevation: 304 m (997 ft)
- Prominence: 52 m (171 ft)
- Parent peak: Cleeve Hill
- Listing: Tump
- Coordinates: 51°59′52″N 1°52′48″W

Geography
- Location within Gloucestershire
- Location: Gloucestershire, England
- Parent range: Cotswolds
- OS grid: SP083332
- Topo map: OS Landranger 150 OS Explorer OL45N

Shenberrow Hill is a prominent hill in the Cotswolds hill range in the county of Gloucestershire and, at 304 metres (997 ft), is the third highest point in the county.

== Location ==
Shenberrow Hill rises on the northwestern edge of the Cotswolds about 5 kilometres south-southwest of the village of Broadway and about 1,200 metres west-southwest of the hamlet of Snowshill. The summit is open and there is a site of an Iron Age hillfort - Shenberrow Hill Camp - on the hillside to the northwest about 300 metres from the top. There is a trig point at 298 metres on the southern spur of the hill about 600 metres from the summit. To the west the ground slopes steeply downhill through partially wooded hillsides to the Vale of Evesham, while to the east it descends briefly before rising again at Oat Hill (c. 272 m) just outside Snowshill.

The county boundary between Gloucestershire and Worcestershire lies about 2 kilometres northeast of Shenberrow Hill.

The actual summit is featureless and lies within an open field.

== See also ==
- List of hills of Gloucestershire
