= Seven Wells Hill =

Hill in Gloucestershire and Worcestershire, England

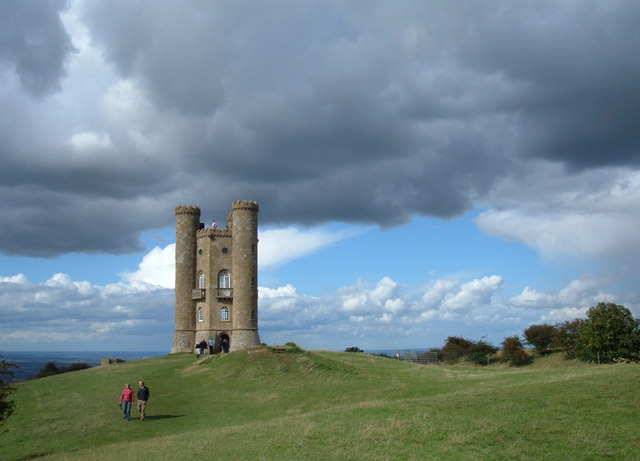
- Broadway Tower in 2006

Highest point
- Elevation: 319 m (1,047 ft)
- Prominence: 121 m (397 ft)
- Parent peak: Cleeve Hill
- Listing: HuMP, Tump
- Coordinates: 52°00′43″N 1°50′03″W

Geography
- Location within Gloucestershire
- Location: Gloucestershire and Worcestershire, England
- Parent range: Cotswolds
- OS grid: SP115348
- Topo map: OS Landranger 150 OS Explorer OL45N

Seven Wells Hill is a prominent hill in the Cotswolds hill range in the counties of Gloucestershire and Worcestershire. At 319 metres (1,047 ft), is the second highest point in Gloucestershire.

== Location ==
Seven Wells Hill is the highest point on a north-south ridge and rises about 3 kilometres south-southeast of the village of Broadway and about 2 kilometres east-northeast of the hamlet of Snowshill. The summit is flanked by woods to the north and west, but is open to the east and south. There are good views from the more open northern part of the ridge, which is called Broadway Hill. To the west the ground slopes steeply downhill through wooded hillsides, while to the east it descends much more gently across open arable country.

The county boundary between Gloucestershire and Worcestershire roughly follows the ridgeline, passing just to the west of the summit by around 100 metres.

The actual summit is at the base of a wall on the south side.

== Broadway Tower ==
There is a prominent folly called Broadway Tower on the ridgeline about 1200 metres north of the summit of Seven Wells Hill.

== See also ==
- List of hills of Gloucestershire
