= Cleeve Common =

Protected area in Gloucestershire, England

- Site of Special Scientific Interest
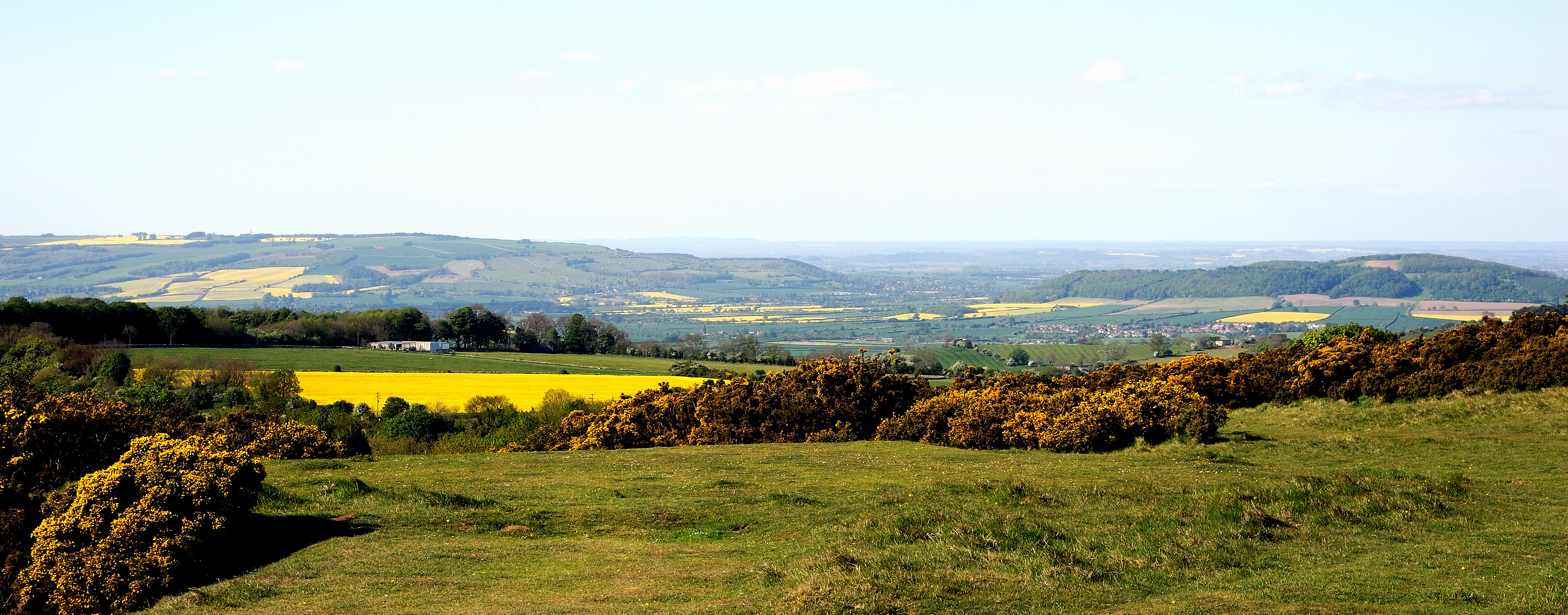
- Cleeve Common panorama
- Location of Cleeve Common.
- Area of search: Gloucestershire
- Grid reference: SO990260
- Coordinates: 51.93296°N 2.015225°W
- Interest: Biological/Geological
- Area: 455 ha (1,120 acres)
- Notification date: 1974

Cleeve Common (grid reference SO990260) is a 455-hectare (1,120-acre) biological and geological Site of Special Scientific Interest in Gloucestershire, England, notified in 1974. It is looked after by a small charity called Cleeve Common Trust, formally Cleeve Common Board of Conservators.

It lies in the Cotswold Area of Outstanding Natural Beauty and is on Cleeve Hill. There is a golf course on the site and the site is registered as a common. The site is on Jurassic limestones on the top of the Cotswold scarp. It is north-east of Cheltenham. It is a large site and is important for its biology and geology.

== Biological interest ==
There are several types of grassland within the site and their origination is dependent upon aspect, soil, grazing intensity and how areas of the common have been managed. The site supports several species of rare orchid such as the bee orchid, the frog orchid and the musk orchid. Spoil and scree from disused quarries provide conditions for plants which grow in more open habitats.

The site supports a wide range of invertebrates. These include butterflies such as the dark green fritillary, grayling and marsh fritillary. The rare snail Abide secale is recorded.

== Geological interest ==
The Bouguetia and phillipsiana beds of the upper Middle Inferior Oolite are confined to a very limited outcrop on Cleeve Common. These units, which have distinctive fossil faunas of bivalves, gastropods and brachiopods, are only visible at Rolling Bank Quarry. These outcrops are thus unique and are considered the only examples of part of the Middle Jurassic, Bajocian, time interval in Britain. The Inferior Oolite hill top of Postlip Warren shows the best example of ridge and trough features.

Pot Quarry and Rolling Bank Quarry are listed as a Regionally Important Geological Site (RIGS). The Cleeve Cloud Fault Section is also so designated.

== SSSI Source ==
- Natural England SSSI information on the citation
- Natural England SSSI information on the Cleeve Common units
