= The Wolds =

Type of English geography

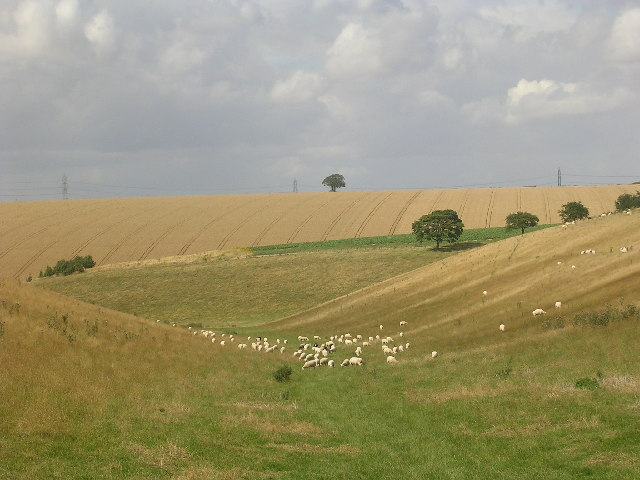
The head of Swindale, on the Yorkshire Wolds Way

The Wolds are a range of hills which consist of open country overlying a base of limestone or chalk.

== Geography ==
The Wolds comprise a series of low hills and steep valleys that are in the main underlain by calcareous (chalk and limestone) and sandstone rock laid down in the Cretaceous and Jurassic periods. One exception to this is the North Leicestershire /South Nottinghamshire Wolds, which are underlain by sometimes chalky glacial till ('Oadby Till'). The characteristic open valleys of the Wolds were created during the last glacial period through the action of glaciation and meltwater. The chalk that underlies the Chalk Wolds Landscape Character Type extends from the Yorkshire Wolds to the south coast of England in East Sussex and in Dorset. Geologically, the Lincolnshire Wolds is a continuation of the Yorkshire Wolds which runs through the East Riding of Yorkshire; the point at which the ranges of hill crosses the Humber is known as the Humber Gap.

== Etymology ==
The name Wold is derived from a term in the Anglian dialect of Old English wald meaning "forest", — cognate with the Weald, "forest" of the West Saxon dialect term of Old English, from Proto-Germanic *walþuz, but unrelated to English "wood", which has a different origin. In other parts of England, dialectic variations can be found.

Over the years, the meaning changed from "forest" to "high forest land". When the forests were cleared, the name was retained and applied to upland areas in general. This was particularly true in the Cotswolds, the Lincolnshire Wolds, and also the Yorkshire Wolds.

== Example of Wolds in literature ==
"Westward before her rose fold upon fold of the encircling hills, piled rich and golden."
Description of the Yorkshire Wolds by Winifred Holtby.

"Then she made cheese…in the dairy, on the farm, and the fields unrolling, and becoming the downlands sleeping under the hot midsummer sun, where the flocks of sheep, moving slowly, drift over the short turf like clouds on a green sky, and here and there sheepdogs speed over the grass like shooting stars. For ever and ever, wold without end." The Wee Free Men by Terry Pratchett

"On either side the river lie
Long fields of barley and of rye,
That clothe the wold and meet the sky;
And thro' the field the road runs by
To many-tower'd Camelot;"
First lines of The Lady of Shalott by Alfred Tennyson

"Once in the wind of morning
I ranged the thymy wold;
The world-wide air was azure
And all the brooks ran gold."
From A Shropshire Lad, by A. E. Housman

== See also ==
- The Weald (West Saxon variation)
