= Cotswolds =

Protected area mostly in South West England

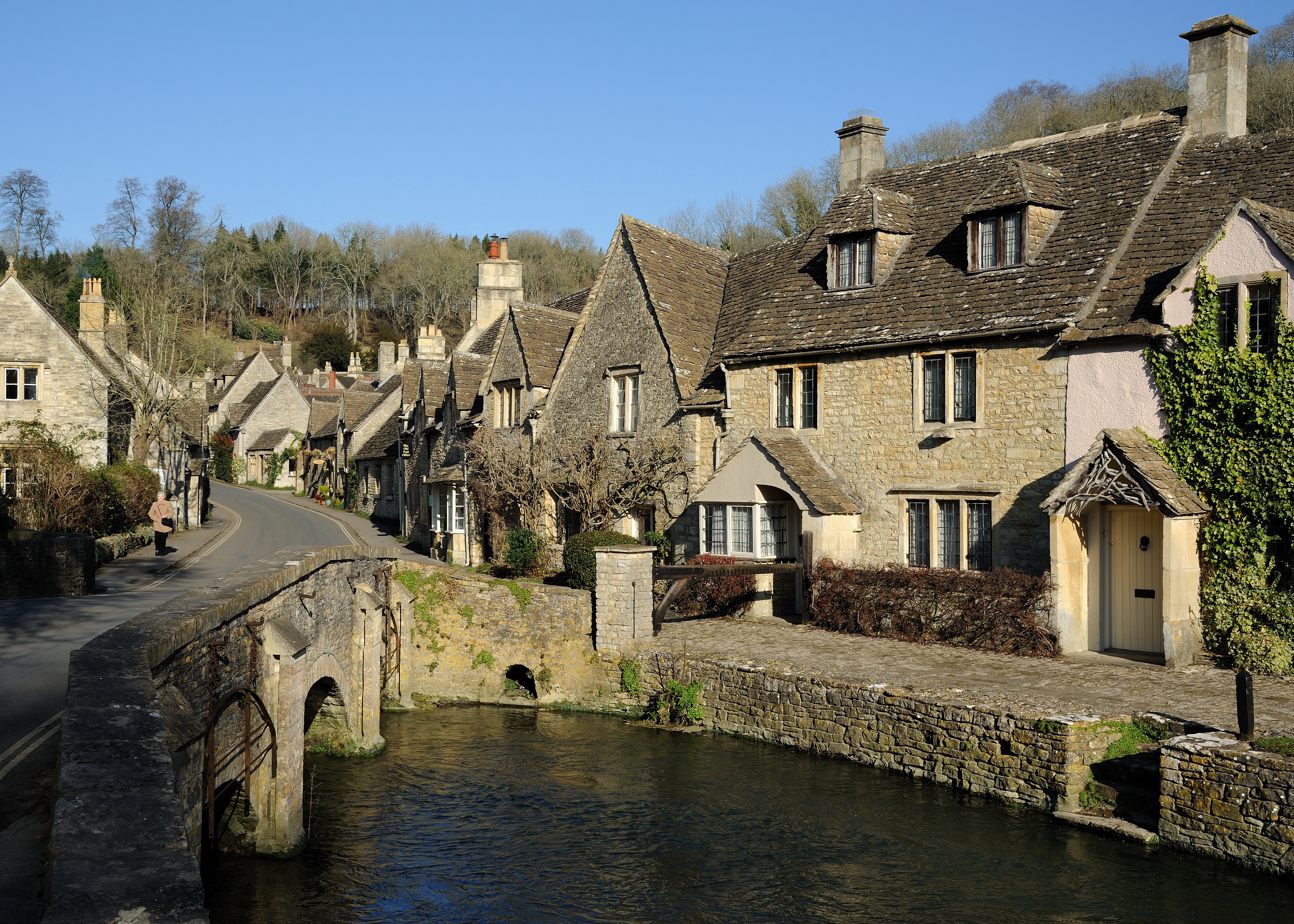
- Castle Combe, a Cotswolds village with buildings made of Cotswold stone

- Location of the Cotswolds National Landscape within England
- Location: England
- Coordinates: 51°48′N 2°2′W
- Area: 2,038 km^{2} (787 sq mi)
- Established: 1966
- Named for: cot + wold, 'sheep enclosure in rolling hillsides'
- Website: cotswolds-nl.org.uk

The Cotswolds (/ˈkɒtswoʊldz, ˈkɒtswəldz/ KOTS-wohldz, KOTS-wəldz) is a region of South Central England, along a range of wolds or rolling hills that rise from the meadows of the upper River Thames to an escarpment above the Severn Valley and the Vale of Evesham. The area is defined by the bedrock of Jurassic limestone that creates a type of grassland habitat that is quarried for the golden-coloured Cotswold stone. It lies across the boundaries of several English counties: mainly Gloucestershire and Oxfordshire, and parts of Wiltshire, Somerset, Worcestershire, and Warwickshire. The highest point is Cleeve Hill at 1,083 ft (330 m), just east of Cheltenham. The predominantly rural landscape contains stone-built villages, towns, stately homes and gardens featuring the local stone.

A large area within the Cotswolds has been designated as a National Landscape (legally still known as Area of Outstanding Natural Beauty, or AONB) since 1966. The designation covers 787 square miles (2,038 km^{2}), with boundaries roughly 25 miles (40 km) across and 90 miles (140 km) long, stretching south-west from just south of Stratford-upon-Avon to just south of Bath, making it the largest National Landscape area and England's third-largest protected landscape.

The Cotswold local government district is within Gloucestershire. Its main town is Cirencester. In 2021, the population of the 450-square-mile (1,200 km^{2}) district was 91,000. The much larger area referred to as the Cotswolds encompasses nearly 800 square miles (2,100 km^{2}). The population of the National Landscape area was 139,000 in 2016.

== History ==
The largest excavation of Jurassic period echinoderm fossils, including of rare and previously unknown species, occurred at a quarry in the Cotswolds in 2021. There is evidence of Neolithic settlement from burial chambers on Cotswold Edge, and there are remains of Bronze and Iron Age forts. Later the Romans built villas, such as at Chedworth, and settlements such as Gloucester, and paved the Celtic path later known as Fosse Way.

During the Middle Ages, thanks to the breed of sheep known as the Cotswold Lion, the Cotswolds became prosperous from the wool trade with the continent, with much of the money made from wool directed towards the building of churches. The most successful era for the wool trade was 1250–1350; much of the wool at that time was sold to Italian merchants. The area still preserves numerous large, handsome Cotswold Stone "wool churches". The affluent area in the 21st century has attracted wealthy Londoners and others who own second homes there or have chosen to retire to the Cotswolds.

=== Etymology ===
The name Cotswold is popularly believed to mean the "sheep enclosure in rolling hillsides", incorporating the term wold, meaning "forested hills", from the Anglian dialect term of Old English — cognate with the Weald, "forest", from the West Saxon dialect term of Old English. But for many years the English Place-Name Society has accepted that the term Cotswold is derived from Codesuualt of the 12th century or other variations on this form, the etymology of which is "Cod's-wold", meaning "Cod's high open land". Cod was interpreted as an Old English personal name, which may be recognised in further names: Cutsdean, Codeswellan, and Codesbyrig, some of which date to the 8th century. It has subsequently been noticed that Cod could derive philologically from a Brittonic female cognate Cuda, a hypothetical mother goddess in Celtic mythology postulated to have been worshipped in the Cotswold region.

== Geography ==
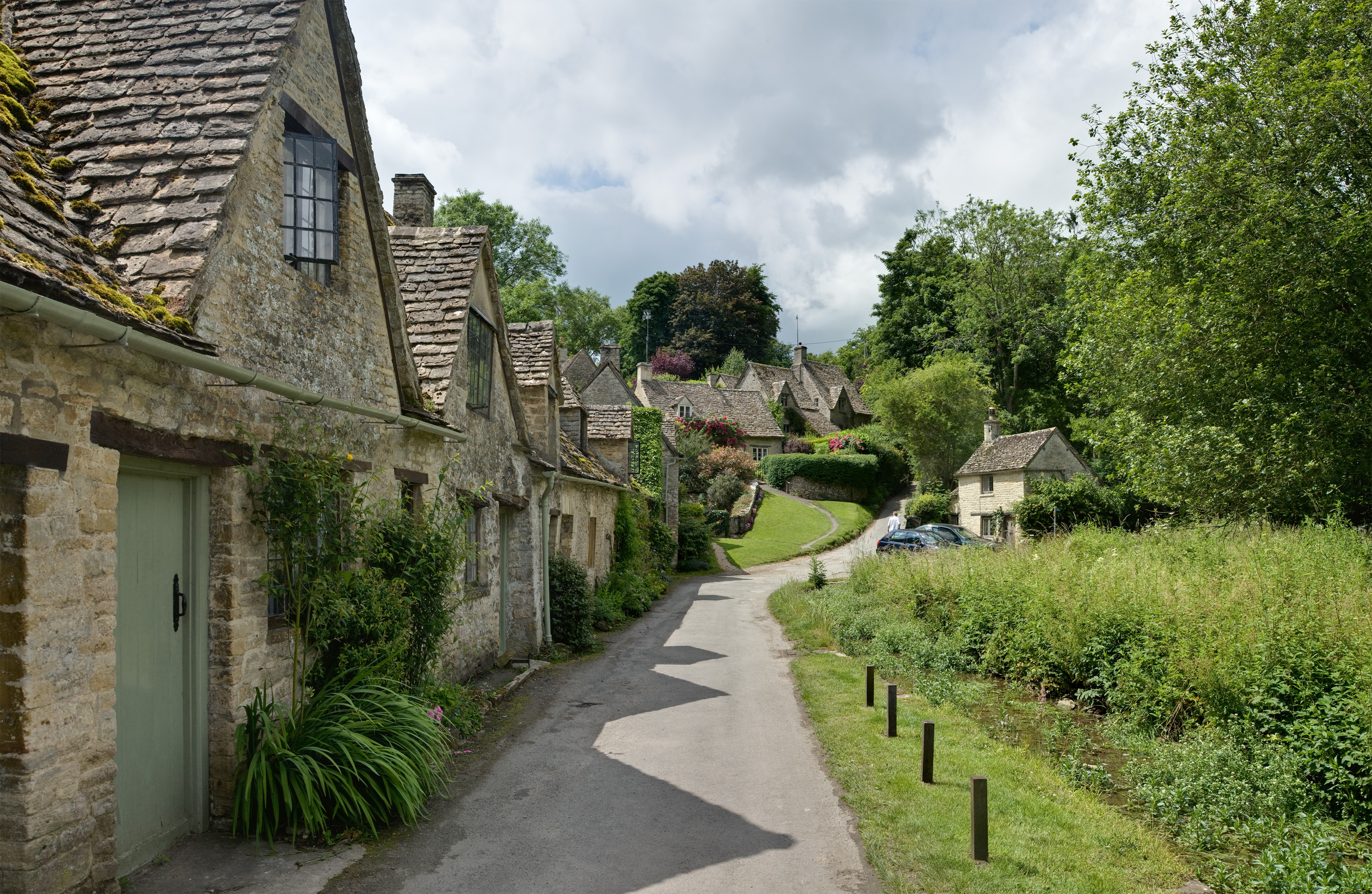
Bibury, a characteristic Cotswold village

The Cotswolds' spine runs southwest to northeast through six counties, particularly Gloucestershire, west Oxfordshire, and southwestern Warwickshire. The Cotswolds' northern and western edges are marked by steep escarpments down to the Severn valley and the Warwickshire Avon. This feature, known as the Cotswold escarpment or the Cotswold Edge, is a result of the uplifting (tilting) of the limestone layer, exposing its broken edge. This is a cuesta, in geological terms. The dip slope is to the southeast.

On the eastern boundary lies the city of Oxford and on the west is Stroud. To the southeast, the upper reaches of the Thames Valley and towns such as Lechlade, Tetbury, and Fairford are often considered to mark the limit of the region. To the south the Cotswolds, with the characteristic uplift of the Cotswold Edge, reach beyond Bath, and towns such as Chipping Sodbury and Marshfield share elements of Cotswold character.

The area is characterised by attractive small towns and villages built of the underlying Cotswold stone (a yellow oolitic limestone). This limestone is rich in fossils, particularly of fossilised sea urchins. Cotswold towns include Charlbury, Chipping Campden, Chipping Norton, Cricklade, Dursley, Malmesbury, Minchinhampton, Moreton-in-Marsh, Nailsworth, Northleach, Painswick, Stow-on-the-Wold, Stroud, Tetbury, Witney, Winchcombe and Wotton-under-Edge. Popular villages include Bourton-on-the-Water, Broadway, Chalford, and South Cerney. In addition, much of Box lies in the Cotswolds. Bath, Cheltenham, Cirencester, Gloucester, and Stroud, are larger urban centres that border on, or are virtually surrounded by, the Cotswold AONB.

Chipping Campden is notable as the home of the Arts and Crafts movement, founded by William Morris at the end of the 19th and beginning of the 20th centuries. Morris lived occasionally in Broadway Tower, a folly, now part of a country park. Chipping Campden is also known for the annual Cotswold Olimpick Games, a celebration of sports and games dating to the early 17th century. Of the Cotswolds' nearly 800 square miles (2,100 km^{2}), roughly 80 per cent is farmland. There are over 3,000 miles (4,800 km) of footpaths and bridleways, and 4,000 miles (6,400 km) of historic stone walls.

The Cotswolds limestones form part of a range of sedimentary rocks deposited in the Middle Jurassic period, the Great Oolite Group and the Inferior Oolite Group. They run between Dorset on the English Channel coast and Scarborough on the Yorkshire coast of the North Sea. Although more famous for their limestone lithologies, they also contain sandstones and mudstones. Within the Cotswolds area, the Great Oolite Group contains limestone formations such as: Cornbrash, White Limestone and Athelstan Oolite. In this area, the Inferior Oolite Group contains limestones such as Birdlip Limestone, Aston Limestone and Salperton Limestone formations. In the East Midlands, the Inferior Oolite Group contains Lincolnshire Limestone (plus Northampton Sandstones containing Ironstone that were quarried for the steelworks at Scunthorpe and Corby). In the southwest of England, the Ham Hill Limestone Member of the Bridport Sand Formation is a honey-coloured limestone reminiscent of the northern Cotswolds limestones. Such areas are sometimes referred to as the Notswolds due to their similarity with the Cotswolds.

=== Principal summits ===
The following table lists the summits with more than 30 metres of prominence (Tumps) that lie within the National Landscape.

| Rank | Summit | Elevation | Prominence | Grid reference |
|---|---|---|---|---|
| 1 | Cleeve Hill | 330 m (1083 ft) | 237 m | SO996246 |
| 2 | Seven Wells Hill | 319 m (1047 ft) | 121 m | SP115348 |
| 3 | Shenberrow Hill | 304 m (997 ft) | 52 m | SP083333 |
| 4 | Roel Hill | 301 m (988 ft) | 67 m | SP054253 |
| 5 | Birdlip Hill | 299.7 m (983 ft) | 117 m | SO924141 |
| 6 | Bredon Hill^{1} | 298.8 m (980 ft) | 254.8 m | SO957402 |
| 7 | Wistley Hill | 298 m (978 ft) | 78 m | SO983180 |
| 8 | Leckhampton Hill | 293 m (961 ft) | 69 m | SO948184 |
| 9 | Upper Coscombe Hill | 290 m (951 ft) | 42 m | SP071296 |
| 10 | Painswick Beacon | 283 m (928 ft) | 76 m | SO868120 |
| 11 | High Brotheridge | 282.5 m (927 ft) | 50.8 m | SO891138 |
| 12 | Nottingham Hill | 280 m (919 ft) | 41 m | SO980283 |
| 13 | Temple Guiting Hill | 279 m (915 ft) | 31.9 m | SP082287 |
| 14 | Langley Hill^{1} | 274.2 m (900 ft) | 102 m | SP008290 |
| 15 | Crickley Hill | 273 m (896 ft) | 41 m | SO930164 |
| 16 | Pen Hill | 267 m (876 ft) | 32 m | SO995123 |
| 17 | Ebrington Hill | 260.7 m (855 ft) | 112 m | SP187426 |
| 18 | Scottsquar Hill | 255.5 m (838 ft) | 71 m | SO838086 |
| 19 | Crawley Hill | 251.2 m (824 ft) | 98 m | SO789000 |
| 20 | Wyck Beacon | 250 m (820 ft) | 96 m | SP201207 |
| 21 | Symonds Hall Hill | 249 m (817 ft) | 32 m | ST790964 |
| 22 | South Hill | 247.5 m (812 ft) | 118 m | SP279303 |
| 23 | Lansdown Hill | 238 m (781 ft) | 73 m | ST715688 |
| 24 | Swell Hill | 235 m (771 ft) | 38 m | SP154267 |
| 25 | Stow on the Wold | 235 m (771 ft) | 45 m | SP190253 |
| 26 | Juniper Hill | 232 m (761 ft) | 45 m | SO869080 |
| 27 | Brailes Hill | 232 m (761 ft) | 97 m | SP295390 |
| 28 | Over Norton Hill | 231 m (758 ft) | 51 m | SP326284 |
| 29 | Shenlow Hill | 227.5 m (746 ft) | 56.6 m | SP355427 |
| 30 | Broom Hill | 226.8 m (744 ft) | 40.6 m | SP341409 |
| 31 | Epwell Hill | 226.4 m (743 ft) | 36.9 m | SP353416 |
| 32 | Oxenton Hill^{1} | 223.6 m (734 ft) | 127.2 m | SO974314 |
| 33 | Tog Hill | 221 m (725 ft) | 51 m | ST736727 |
| 34 | Cam Long Down | 220 m (722 ft) | 92 m | ST775995 |
| 35 | Stinchcombe Hill | 219 m (718 ft) | 48 m | ST737982 |
| 36 | Henley Hill | 215 m (705 ft) | 31.1 m | ST749715 |
| 37 | Minchinhampton Common | 207 m (679 ft) | 33 m | SO853016 |
| 38 | Bathford Hill | 205 m (673 ft) | 101 m | ST794660 |
| 39 | Widdenhill | 205 m (673 ft) | 32 m | ST770846 |
| 40 | Bathampton Down | 204.6 m (671 ft) | 63 m | ST773651 |
| 41 | Alderton Hill^{1} | 203 m (666 ft) | 142 m | SP009345 |
| 42 | Downham Hill | 199 m (653 ft) | 58 m | ST776985 |
| 43 | Meon Hill | 194 m (636 ft) | 72 m | SP175453 |
| 44 | Little Solsbury Hill | 191.8 m (629 ft) | 67 m | ST767679 |
| 45 | Mine Hill | 191 m (627 ft) | 38 m | SP319378 |
| 46 | Cam Peak | 183.5 m (602 ft) | 30.3 m | ST767991 |
| 47 | Castle Hill | 169 m (554 ft) | 33 m | SP307403 |
| 48 | Dumbleton Hill^{1} | 168 m (551 ft) | 42 m | SP008353 |
| 49 | Dixton Hill | 163.4 m (536 ft) | 67 m | SO986306 |
| 50 | Hayes Wood Hill | 154 m (505 ft) | 35 m | ST773605 |
| 51 | Box Hill | 149.7 m (491 ft) | 42 m | ST841695 |
| 52 | Doverow Hill | 143 m (469 ft) | 31 m | SO815053 |
| 53 | Nut Hill^{1} | 119 m (390 ft) | 35 m | SO874150 |
| 54 | Shrub Down | 107 m (351 ft) | 54 m | ST794595 |

^{1}in the Severn and Avon Vales National Character Area, rather than the Cotswolds NCA

The following summits are in the Cotswolds NCA, but outside the National Landscape:

| Summit | Elevation | Prominence | Grid reference |
|---|---|---|---|
| Long Hill | 206 m (676 ft) | 35 m | SP366405 |
| Barton Hill | 197 m (646 ft) | 41 m | SP380398 |
| Mells Down | 185.5 m (609 ft) | 51.1 m | ST718518 |
| Huddox Hill | 177 m (581 ft) | 54 m | ST707576 |
| Steepness Hill | 154 m (505 ft) | 39 m | SP437317 |
| Lyncombe Hill | 127 m (417 ft) | 33 m | ST751639 |

== Economy ==
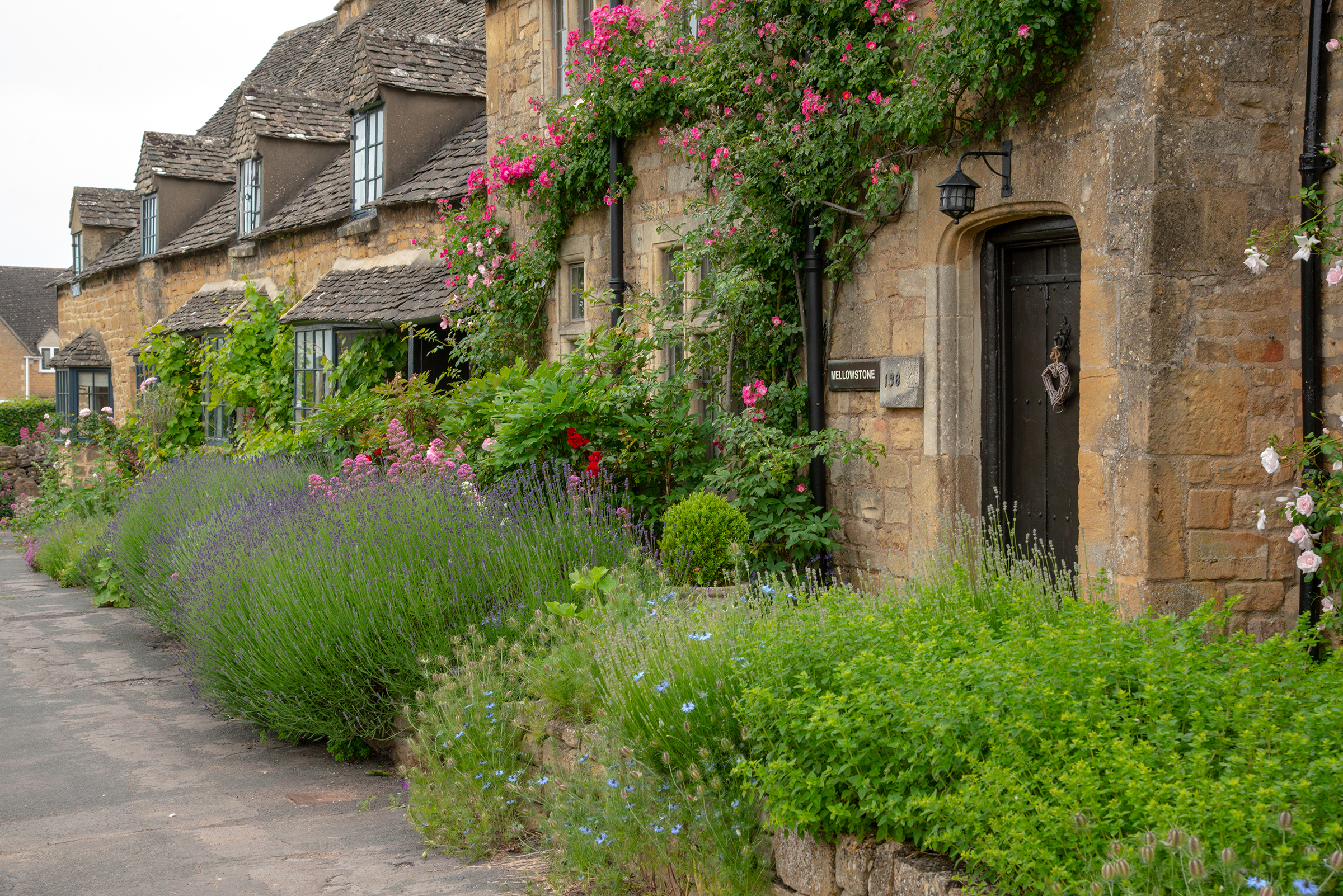
Row houses of Cotswold stone in Broadway, Worcestershire. The quaint buildings of the village attract many tourists.

A 2017 report on employment within the Area of Outstanding Natural Beauty stated that the main sources of income were real estate, renting and business activities, manufacturing, and wholesale & retail trade repairs. Some 44% of residents were employed in these sectors. Agriculture is also important; 86% of the land in the AONB is used for this purpose. The primary crops include barley, beans, rapeseed and wheat, while the raising of sheep is also important; cows and pigs are also reared. The livestock sector has been declining since 2002.

According to 2021 census data for the Cotswolds, the wholesale and retail trade was the largest employer (14.2% of the workforce), followed by health and social work (10.1%) and education (9%). The report also indicates that a relatively higher proportion of residents worked in agriculture, forestry and fishing, accommodation and food services, as well as in professional, scientific, and technical activities. Unemployment in the Cotswold District was among the lowest in the country. An August 2017 report showed only 315 unemployed persons, a decrease of five from a year earlier.

=== Tourism ===
Tourism is a significant part of the economy. The Cotswold District area gained over £373 million from visitor spending on accommodation, £157 million on local attractions and entertainments, and about £100m on travel in 2016. In the larger Cotswolds Tourism area, including Stroud, Cheltenham, Gloucester and Tewkesbury, tourism generated about £1 billion in 2016, providing 200,000 jobs. Some 38 million day visits were made to the Cotswold Tourism area that year.

Many travel guides direct tourists to Chipping Campden, Stow-on-the-Wold, Bourton-on-the-Water, Broadway, Bibury, and Stanton. Some of these locations can be very crowded at times. Roughly 300,000 people visit Bourton per year, for example, with about half staying for a day or less. The area also has numerous public walking trails and footpaths that attract visitors, including the 93-mile (150 km) Cotswold Way (part of the National Trails system) from Bath to Chipping Campden.

=== Housing development ===
In August 2018, the final decision was made for a Local Plan that would lead to the building of nearly 7,000 additional homes by 2031, in addition to over 3,000 already built. Areas for development include Cirencester, Bourton-on-the-Water, Down Ampney, Fairford, Kemble, Lechlade, Northleach, South Cerney, Stow-on-the-Wold, Tetbury and Moreton-in-Marsh. Some of the money received from developers will be earmarked for new infrastructure to support the increasing population.

== Cotswold stone ==
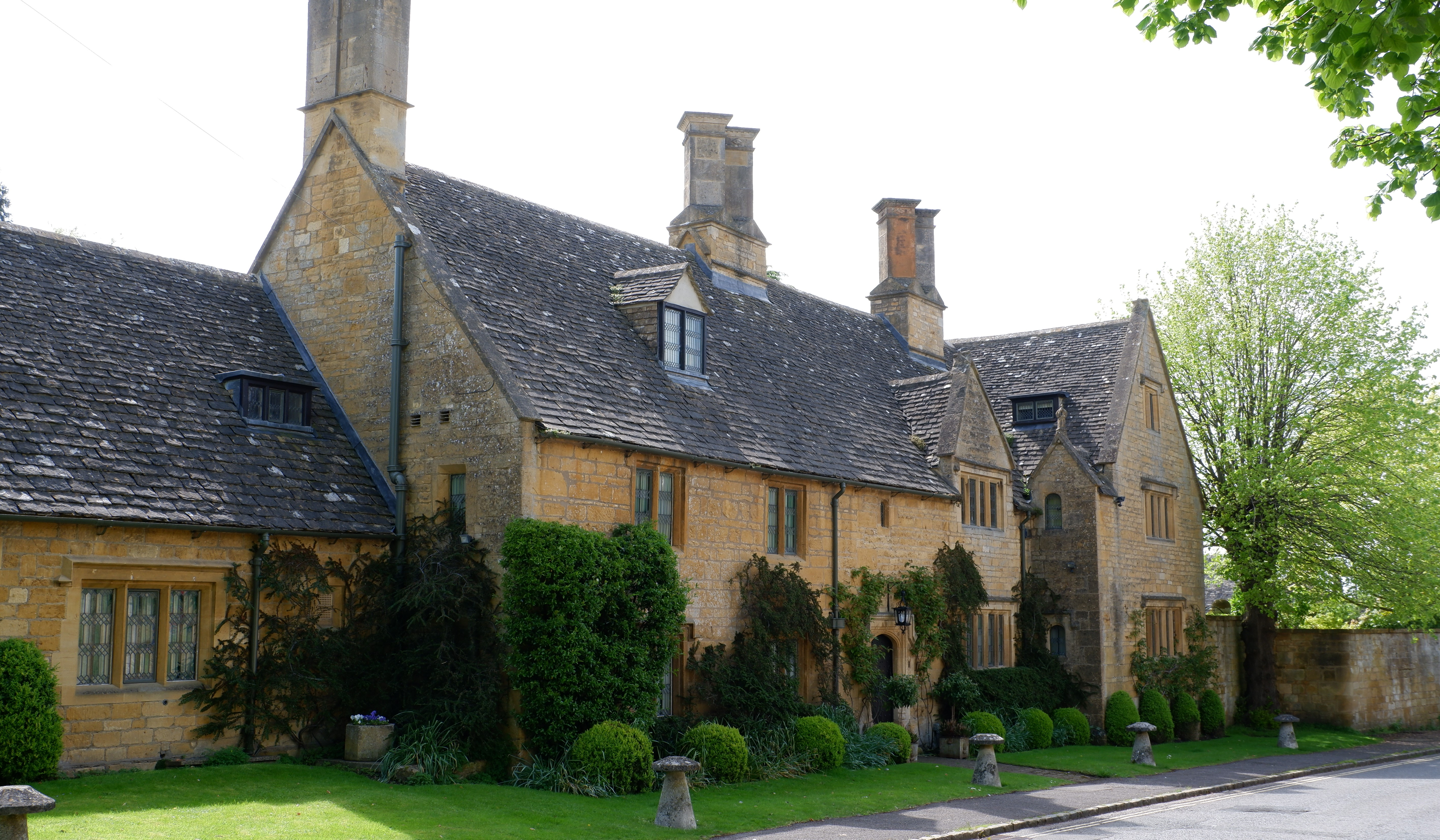
Thomas E. Wells's former estate, Orchard Farm, made of Cotswold stone from the 17th–20th century

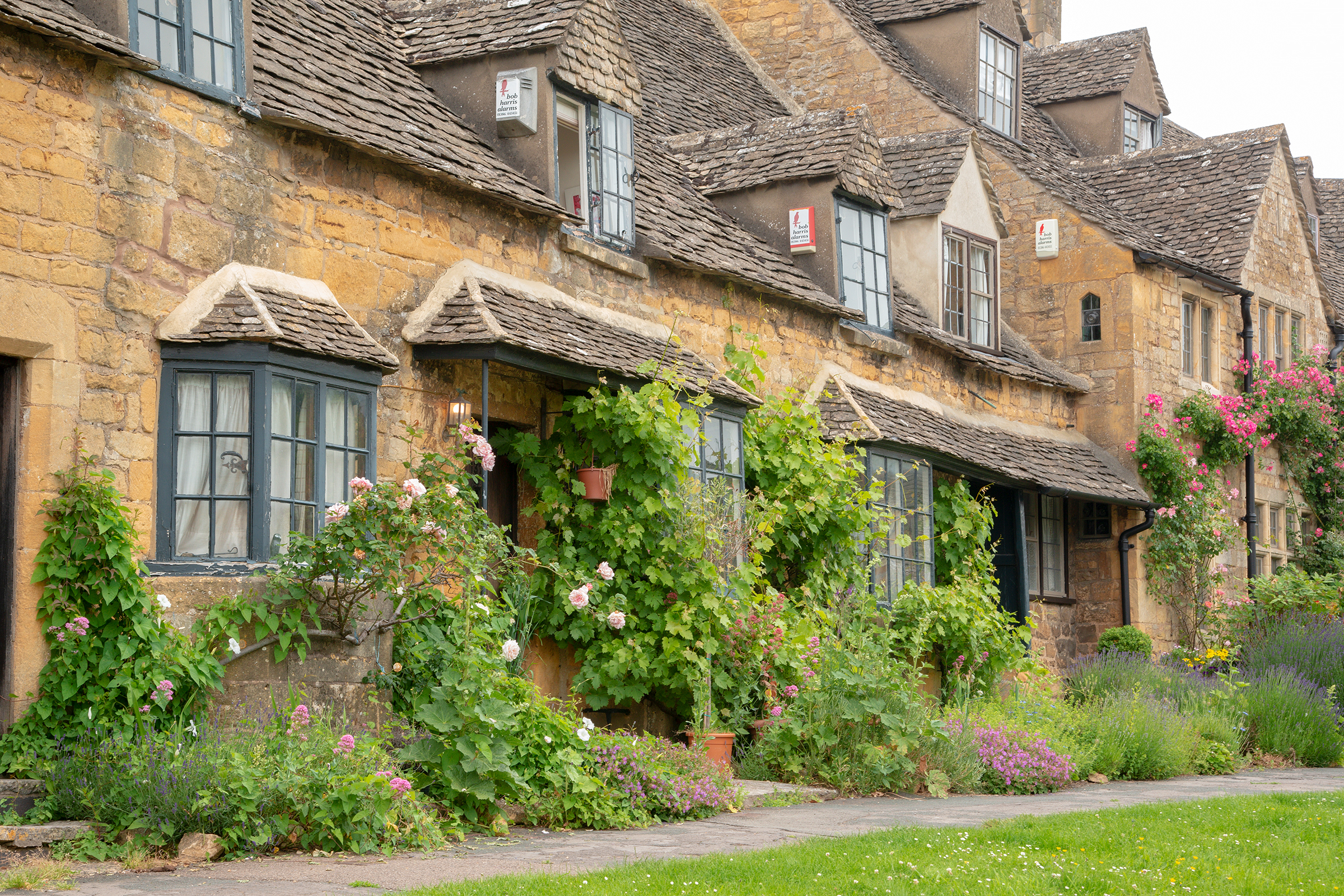
Broadway row houses of Cotswold stone

Cotswold stone is a yellow oolitic Jurassic limestone. This limestone is rich in fossils, particularly of fossilised sea urchins. When weathered, the colour of buildings made or faced with this stone is often described as honey or golden. The stone varies in colour from north to south, being honey-coloured in the north and northeast, as in villages such as Stanton and Broadway; golden-coloured in the central and southern areas, as in Dursley and Cirencester; and pearly white in Bath stone.

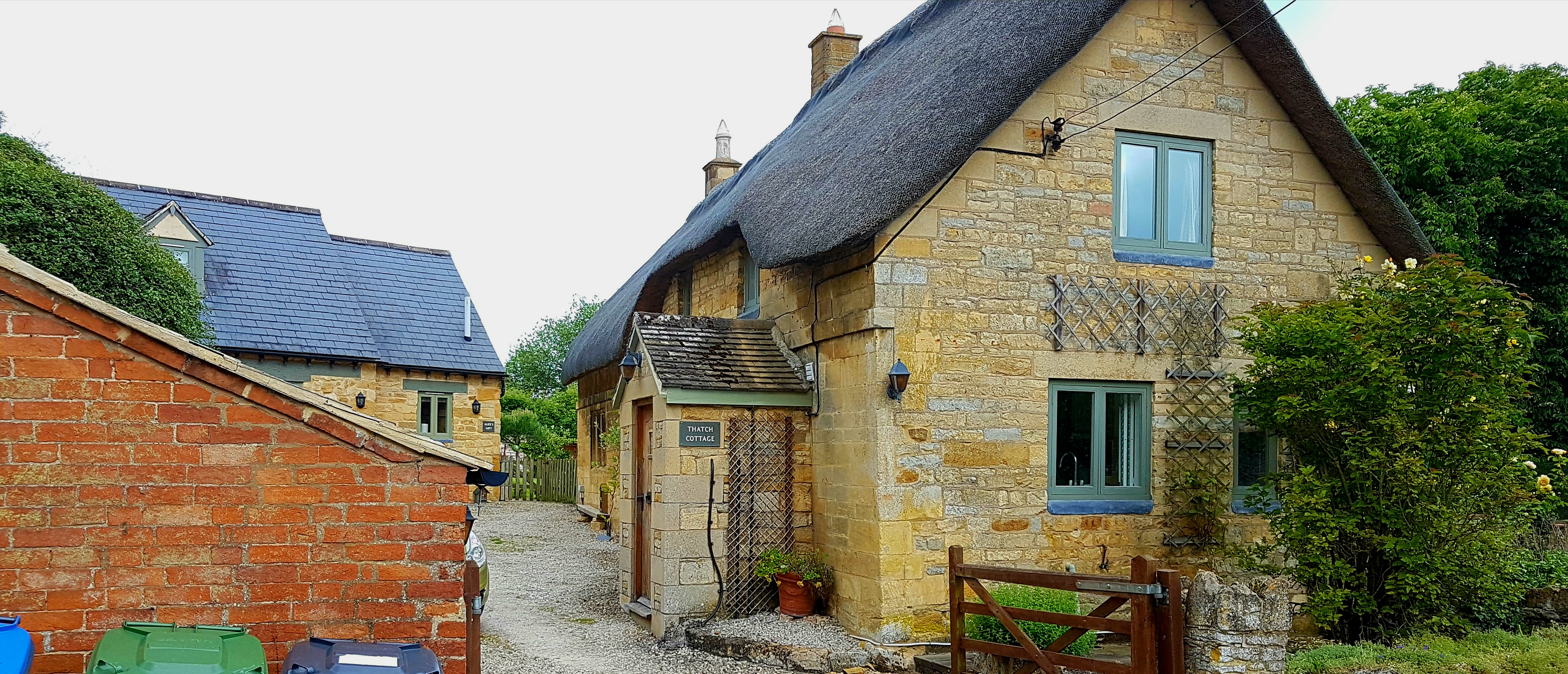
Stretton-On-Fosse. Some of the stone cottages feature thatched roofs, although slate is now more common.

The rock outcrops at places on the Cotswold Edge; small quarries are common. The exposures are rarely sufficiently compact to be good for rock-climbing, but an exception is Castle Rock, on Cleeve Hill, near Cheltenham. In his 1934 book English Journey, J. B. Priestley wrote of Cotswold buildings made of the local stone. He said: "The truth is that it has no colour that can be described. Even when the sun is obscured and the light is cold, these walls are still faintly warm and luminous, as if they knew the trick of keeping the lost sunlight of centuries glimmering about them."

== Cotswolds National Landscape ==
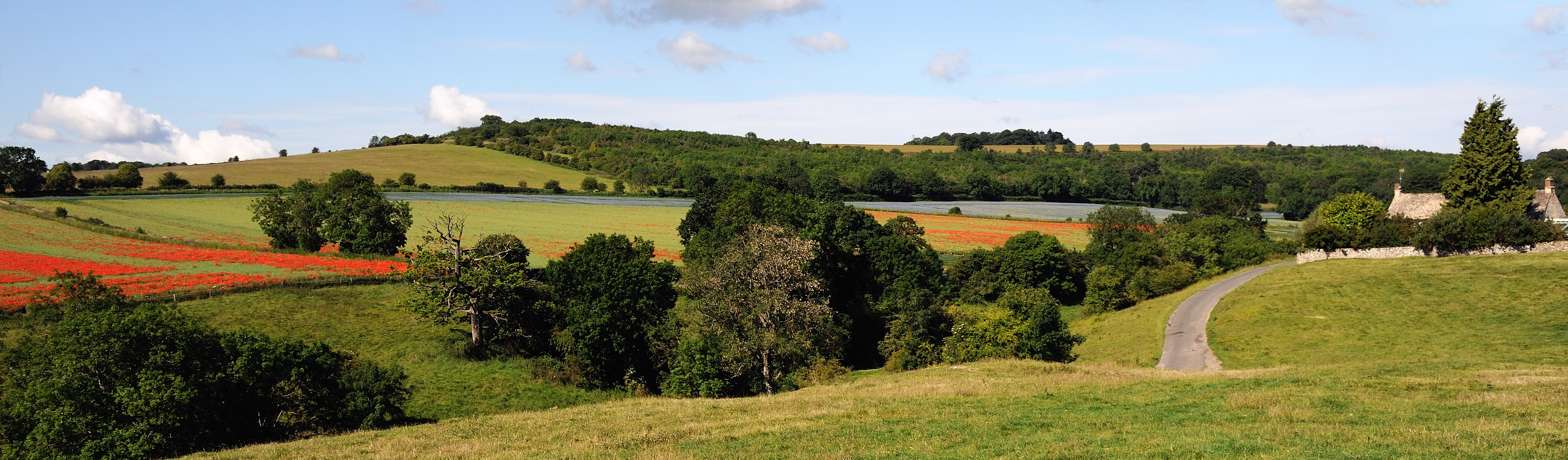
Rolling hills and farm fields near Coberley that typify the Cotswolds landscape

The term "Cotswolds National Landscape" was adopted in September 2020, using a proposed name replacement for Areas of Outstanding Natural Beauty (AONB). All AONBs in England and Wales were re-branded as "National Landscapes" in November 2023, although (as of 2024) the legal name and designation remains "Area of Outstanding Natural Beauty" under the Countryside and Rights of Way Act 2000, amending the National Parks and Access to the Countryside Act 1949. The term AONB is still used in this section.

The Cotswolds National Landscape area (formerly the Cotwolds AONB) was originally designated as an Area of Outstanding Natural Beauty (AONB) in 1966, with an expansion on 21 December 1990 to 1,990 square kilometres (768 sq mi). In 1991, all AONBs were measured again using modern methods, and the official area of the Cotswolds AONB was increased to 2,038 square kilometres (787 sq mi). In 2000, the government confirmed that AONBs have the same landscape quality and status as National Parks. It is England's third-largest protected landscape, after the Lake District and Yorkshire Dales national parks.

The Cotswolds National Landscape, which is the largest in England and Wales, stretches from the border regions of South Warwickshire and Worcestershire, through West Oxfordshire and Gloucestershire, and takes in parts of Wiltshire and of Bath and North East Somerset in the south. Gloucestershire County Council is responsible for sixty-three per cent of the AONB. The Cotswolds Conservation Board has the task of conserving and enhancing the AONB. Established under statute in 2004 as an independent public body, the Board carries out a range of work from securing funding for 'on the ground' conservation projects, to providing a strategic overview of the area for key decision makers, such as planning officials. The Board is funded by Natural England and the seventeen local authorities that are covered by the AONB. The Cotswolds AONB Management Plan 2018–2023 was adopted by the Board in September 2018.

The landscape of the AONB is varied, including escarpment outliers, escarpments, rolling hills and valleys, enclosed limestone valleys, settled valleys, ironstone hills and valleys, high wolds and high wold valleys, high wold dip-slopes, dip-slope lowland and valleys, a Low limestone plateau, cornbrash lowlands, farmed slopes, a broad floodplain valley, a large pastoral lowland vale, a settled unwooded vale, and an unwooded vale. While the beauty of the Cotswolds AONB is intertwined with that of the villages that seem almost to grow out of the landscape, the Cotswolds were primarily designated an Area of Outstanding Natural Beauty for the rare limestone grassland habitats as well as the old growth beech woodlands that typify the area. These habitat areas are also the last refuge for many other flora and fauna, with some so endangered that they are protected under the Wildlife and Countryside Act 1981. Cleeve Hill, and its associated commons, is a fine example of a limestone grassland and it is one of the few locations where the Duke of Burgundy butterfly may still be found in abundance.

A June 2018 report stated that the AONB receives "23 million visitors a year, the third largest of any protected landscape". Earlier that year, Environment secretary Michael Gove announced that a panel would be formed to consider making some of the AONBs into National Parks. The review will file its report in 2019. In April 2018, the Cotswolds Conservation Board had written to Natural England "requesting that consideration be given to making the Cotswolds a National Park", according to Liz Eyre, chairman. This has led to some concern; one member of the Cotswold District Council said, "National Park designation is a significant step further and raises the prospect of key decision making powers being taken away from democratically elected councillors". In other words, Cotswold District Council would no longer have the authority to grant and refuse housing applications.

Indicative of the Cotswolds' uniqueness and value is that five European Special Areas of Conservation, three national nature reserves and more than 80 Sites of Special Scientific Interest are within the Cotswolds AONB. The Cotswold Voluntary Wardens Service was established in 1968 to help conserve and enhance the area, and now has more than 300 wardens. The Cotswold Way is a long-distance footpath, just over 100 miles (160 km) long, running the length of the AONB, mainly on the edge of the Cotswold escarpment with views over the Severn Valley and the Vale of Evesham.

== Places of interest ==
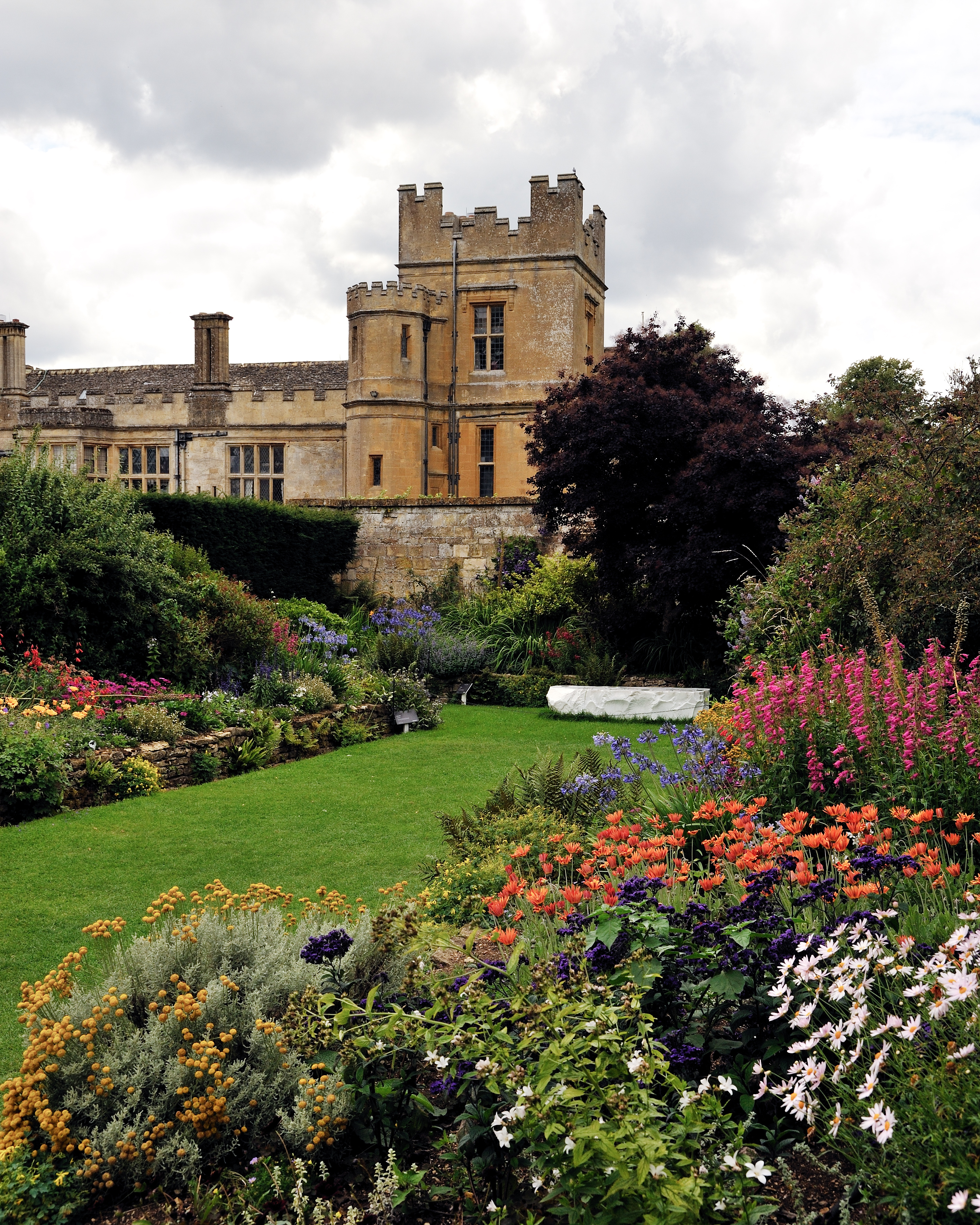
The Secret Garden at Sudeley Castle

Pictured is the garden of Sudeley Castle at Winchcombe. The present castle structure was built in the 15th century and may be on the site of a 12th-century castle. It is north of the spa town of Cheltenham, which has much Georgian architecture. Further south, towards Tetbury, is the fortress known as Beverston Castle, founded in 1229 by Maurice de Gaunt. In the same area is Calcot Manor, a manor house with origins in about 1300 as a tithe barn.

Tetbury Market House was built in 1655. During the Middle Ages, Tetbury became an important market for Cotswold wool and yarn. Chavenage House is an Elizabethan-era manor house 1.5 miles (2.4 km) northwest of Tetbury. Chedworth Roman Villa, where several mosaic floors are on display, is near the Roman road known as the Fosse Way, 8 miles (13 km) north of the town of Corinium Dobunnorum (Cirencester). Cirencester Abbey was founded as an Augustinian monastery in 1117, and Malmesbury Abbey was one of the few English houses with a continual history from the 7th century through to the Dissolution of the Monasteries.

An unusual house in this area is Quarwood, a Victorian Gothic house in Stow-on-the-Wold. The grounds, covering 42 acres (17 ha), include parkland, fish ponds, paddocks, garages, woodlands and seven cottages. Another is Woodchester Mansion, an unfinished, Gothic revival mansion house in Woodchester Park near Nympsfield. Newark Park is a Grade I listed country house of Tudor origins near the village of Ozleworth, Wotton-under-Edge. The house sits in an estate of 700 acres (300 ha) at the Cotswold escarpment's southern end.

Another of the many manor houses in the area, Owlpen Manor in the village of Owlpen in the Stroud district, is also Tudor and Grade I listed. Further north, Broadway Tower is a folly on Broadway Hill, near the village of Broadway, Worcestershire. To the south of the Cotswolds is Corsham Court, a country house in a park designed by Capability Brown in the town of Corsham, 3 miles (5 km) west of Chippenham, Wiltshire.

== Transport ==
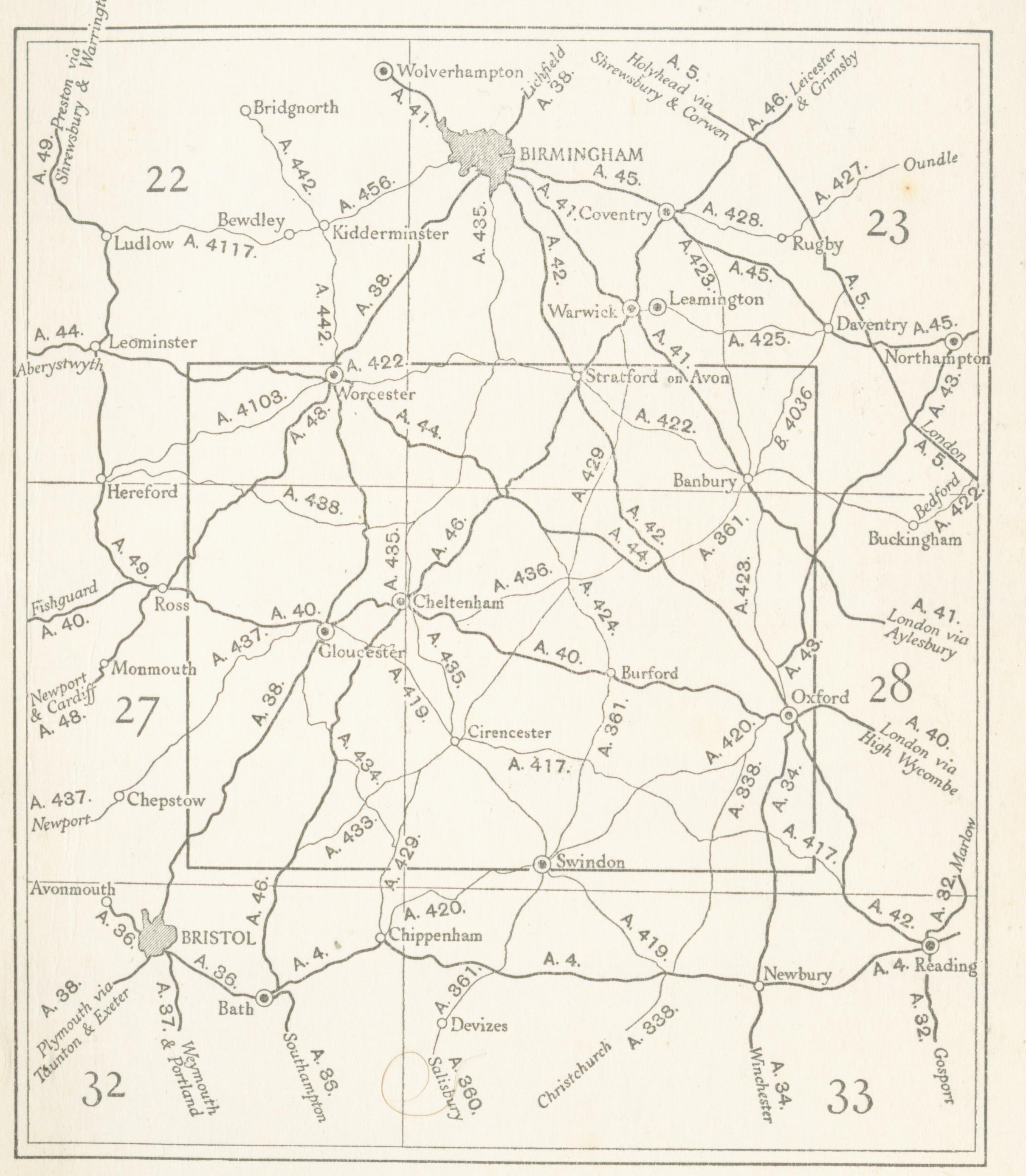
Map of Cotswolds roads from 1933

The Cotswolds lie between the M5, M40 and M4 motorways. The main A-roads through the area are:

- the A46: Bath – Stroud – Cheltenham – Evesham;
- the A419: Swindon – Cirencester – Stroud;
- the A417: Lechlade – Cirencester – Gloucester;
- the A429: Malmesbury – Cirencester – Stow-on-the-Wold – Moreton-in-Marsh;
- the A44: Chipping Norton – Moreton-in-Marsh – Evesham;
- the A40: Oxford – Burford – Cheltenham – Gloucester.

These all roughly follow the routes of ancient roads, some laid down by the Romans, such as Ermin Way and the Fosse Way.

There are local bus services across the area, but some are infrequent.

The River Thames flows from the Cotswolds and is navigable from Inglesham and Lechlade-on-Thames downstream to Oxford. West of Inglesham. the Thames and Severn Canal and the Stroudwater Navigation connected the Thames to the River Severn; this route is mostly disused nowadays but several parts are in the process of being restored.

=== Railways ===
The area is bounded by two major rail routes: in the south by the main Bristol–Bath–London line (including the South Wales main line) and in the west by the Bristol–Birmingham main line. In addition, the Cotswold line runs through the Cotswolds from Oxford to Worcester, and the Golden Valley line runs across the hills from Swindon via Stroud to Gloucester, carrying fast and local services.

Mainline rail services to the big cities run from railway stations such as Bath, Swindon, Oxford, Cheltenham, and Worcester. Mainline trains run by Great Western Railway to London Paddington also are available from Kemble station near Cirencester, Kingham station near Stow-on-the-Wold, Charlbury station, and Moreton-in-Marsh station. Additionally, there is the Gloucestershire Warwickshire Railway, a steam heritage railway over part of the closed Stratford–Cheltenham line, running from Cheltenham Racecourse through Gotherington, Winchcombe, and Hayles Abbey Halt to Toddington and Laverton. The preserved line has been extended to Broadway.

== Demographics ==
The population of the Cotswold local authority area in the 2021 census was 90,800, an increase of 9.6% from 82,900 in 2011. The percentage of usual residents in relationships, aged 16 and above, were:

- Married or in a registered civil partnership: 53.2%
- Never married and never registered a civil partnership: 27.9%
- Divorced or civil partnership dissolved: 9.8%
- Widowed or surviving civil partnership partner: 7.1%
- Separated, but still legally married or still legally in a civil partnership: 2.0%

In 2021, 96.3% of people in Cotswold identified their ethnic group with the "White" category, a slight decrease from 97.8% in 2011. Over 1.3% identified as "Asian" or British Asian, 1.5% chose "Mixed or Multiple" category, 0.4% were "Black, Black British, Caribbean or African" and 0.4% chose "Other".

== In culture ==
The Cotswold region has inspired several notable English composers. In the early 1900s, Herbert Howells and Ivor Gurney took long walks together over the hills, and Gurney urged Howells to make the landscape, including the nearby Malvern Hills, the inspiration for future work. In 1916, Howells wrote his first major piece, the Piano Quartet in A minor, inspired by the magnificent view of the Malverns; he dedicated it to "the hill at Chosen (Churchdown) and Ivor Gurney who knows it". Another contemporary of theirs, Gerald Finzi, lived in nearby Painswick.

Gustav Holst, who was born in Cheltenham, spent much of his early years playing the organ in Cotswold village churches, including at Cranham, after which he titled his tune for "In the Bleak Midwinter". He also called his Symphony in F major, Op. 8, H47, The Cotswolds. Holst's friend Ralph Vaughan Williams was born at Down Ampney in the Cotswolds and, though he moved to Surrey as a boy, gave the name of his native village to the tune for Come Down, O Love Divine. His opera Hugh the Drover depicts life in a Cotswold village and incorporates local folk melodies. In 1988, the 6th symphony (Op. 109) of composer Derek Bourgeois was titled A Cotswold Symphony. The Cotswolds are a popular location for scenes in films and television programmes.

The 2008 film Better Things, directed by Duane Hopkins, is set in a small Cotswold village. The fictional detective Agatha Raisin lives in the fictional Cotswold village of Carsely. Other productions filmed in the Cotswolds or nearby, at least in part, include some of the Harry Potter series (Gloucester Cathedral), Bridget Jones's Diary (Snowshill), Pride and Prejudice (Cheltenham Town Hall), and Braveheart (Cotswold Farm Park).

The television series Father Brown is set in and primarily filmed in the Cotswolds. Scenes and buildings in Sudeley Castle was often featured in the series. The vicarage in Blockley was used for the main character's residence and the Anglican St Peter and St Paul church was the Roman Catholic St Mary's. Other filming locations included Guiting Power, the former hospital in Moreton-in-Marsh, Winchcombe railway station, Lower Slaughter, and St Peter's Church in Upper Slaughter. In the 2010s BBC TV series Poldark, the location for Ross Poldark's family home, Trenwith, is Chavenage House, Tetbury, which is open to the public. Many exterior shots of village life in the Downton Abbey TV series were filmed in Bampton, Oxfordshire; other filming locations in that county included Swinbrook, Cogges, and Shilton. The television documentary agriculture-themed series Clarkson's Farm was filmed at various locations around Chipping Norton.

The author Jilly Cooper is closely associated with the area, basing her fictional county of Rutshire, and its book series the Rutshire Chronicles, on the area.

== See also ==
- Chilterns
- Cotswold architecture
- Geology of Great Britain
