= Cotswold Way =

Long-distance footpath in the southwest of England

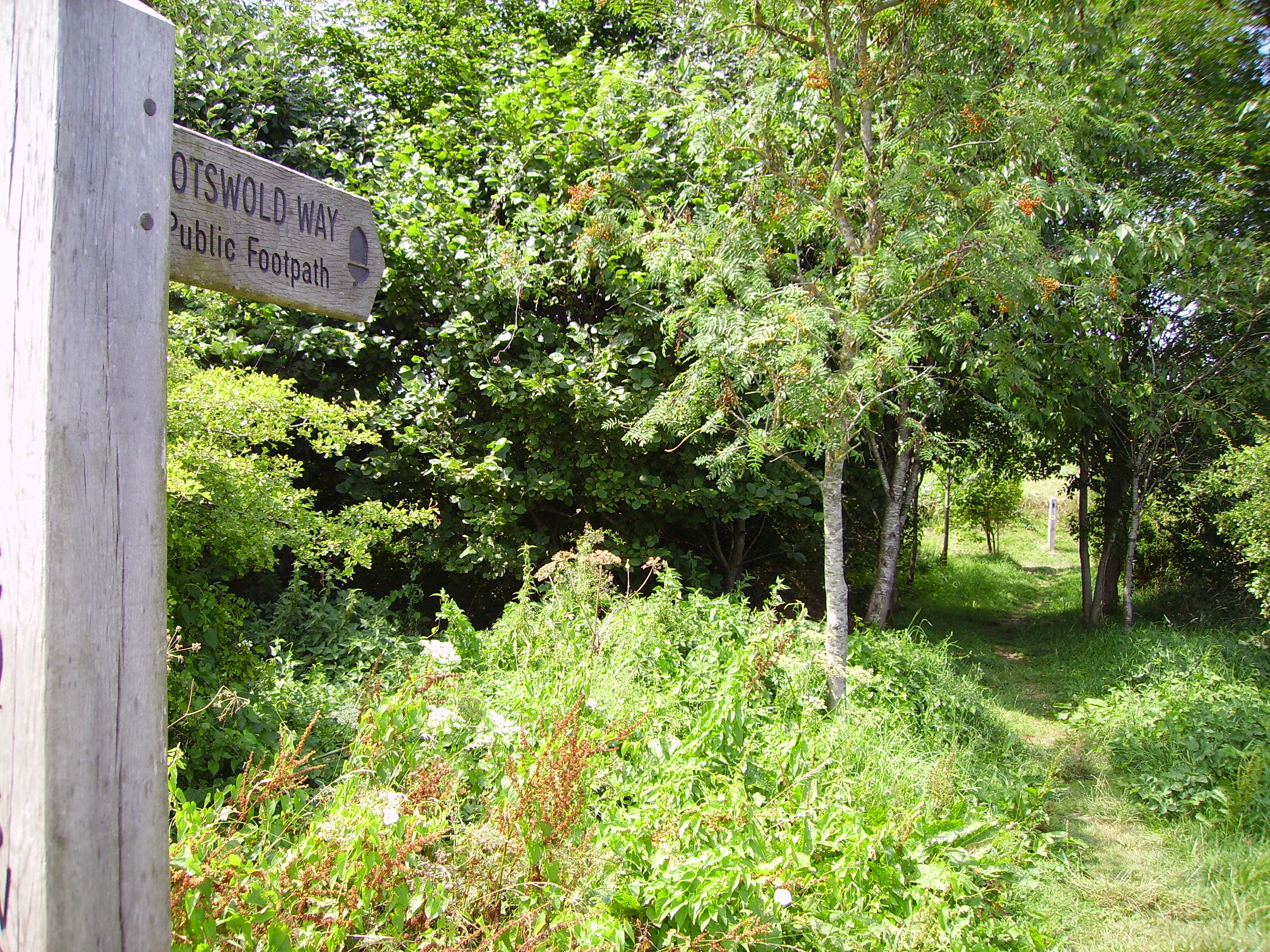
- The Cotswold Way passing through the site of the Battle of Lansdowne
- Length: 164 km (102 mi)
- Location: Central England
- Designation: UK National Trail
- Trailheads: Chipping Campden, Gloucestershire; Bath, Somerset
- Use: Hiking
- Highest point: Cleeve Hill, 1,083 ft (330 m)

The Cotswold Way is a 102-mile (164 km) long-distance footpath, running along the Cotswold Edge escarpment of the Cotswold Hills in England. It was officially inaugurated as a National Trail on 24 May 2007 and several new rights of way have been created.

== History ==
The Cotswold Way route was first suggested some 50 years ago by Gloucestershire-area Ramblers, of which Tony Drake of Cheltenham area and the Cyril Trenfield of the South Gloucestershire area were principals. Although recognised as a suitable route for a National Trail in due course, the path was initially sponsored by Gloucestershire County Council, who had no powers of footpath creation, and so used only existing rights of way.

An early guide to the Way, in the hand-drawn pictorial style of Alfred Wainwright, was produced by another Cheltenham-area rambler, Mark Richards, in 1973. The foreword from Tony Drake says:

"... it is necessary to trace the history of the project to date. Following the passing of the National Parks and Access to the Countryside Act of 1949, which made provision for the designation and creation of long distance paths, I put forward the idea of a footpath route following the Cotswold escarpment. This met with great interest but the plans which the Gloucestershire Committee of the Ramblers Association submitted to the National Parks Commission in 1953, though acknowledged and mentioned in the Commission's annual report of that year, was nevertheless pigeonholed and largely forgotten until Gloucestershire County Council prepared its recreational plan for the countryside in 1968. The County Council decided to designate a Cotswold Way route itself, using existing public rights of way, and the scheme was launched during Footpath Week in May 1970. The Way has had priority in signposting and waymarking programmes but until the Countryside Commission get ministerial approval to create a national route, grants will not be available for maintenance and several very desirable rights of way, where none now exist are unlikely to be created."

A memorial to Trenfield in the form of a bench is on the Way near Dyrham Park.

== Views ==
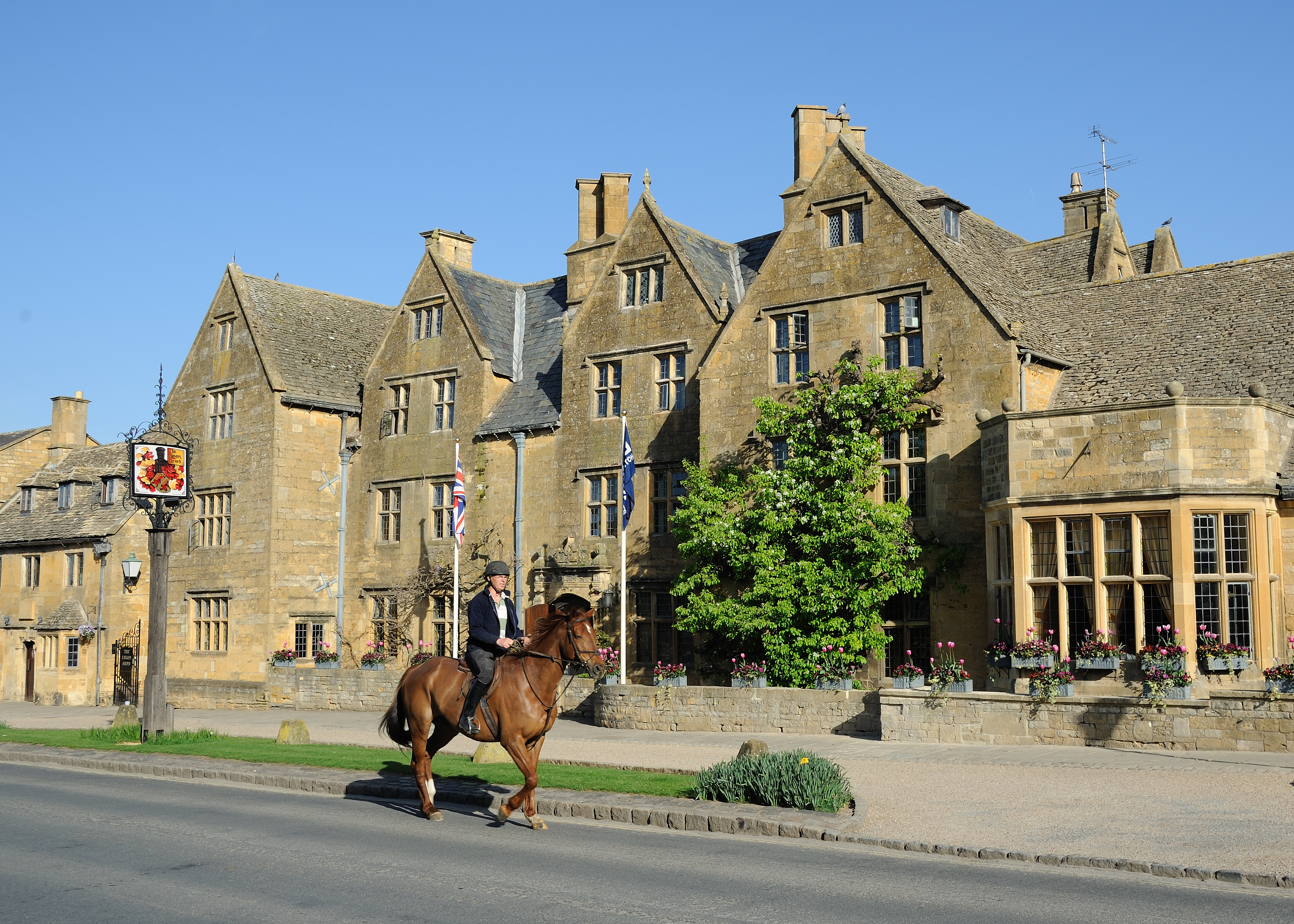
Broadway, Worcestershire (2011)

As it closely follows the scarp of the Cotswold Edge, the Cotswold Way usually affords views, mainly to the north and west—starting in the south with the Severn Estuary and Severn bridges, the meanders of the River Severn above Sharpness, the Forest of Dean, the Welsh hills of Monmouthshire and the Black Mountains on the Welsh border to the west. The distinctive shape of May Hill is visible for much of the route, as is the long spine of the Malvern Hills. Gloucester Cathedral can be seen from the path.

Further north on the path, above Cheltenham, there are old quarries containing rock features such as the Devil's Chimney at Leckhampton. After Cleeve Hill the escarpment starts to turn to the east, giving views across the Vale of Evesham. The classic Cotswold villages of Stanton and Stanway are visited, then Broadway village, before the final steep ascent to Broadway Tower and the scenic descent to Chipping Campden.

On a clear day, the Clee Hills near Ludlow can be seen, 60 miles (97 km) to the northwest.

== Places of interest ==
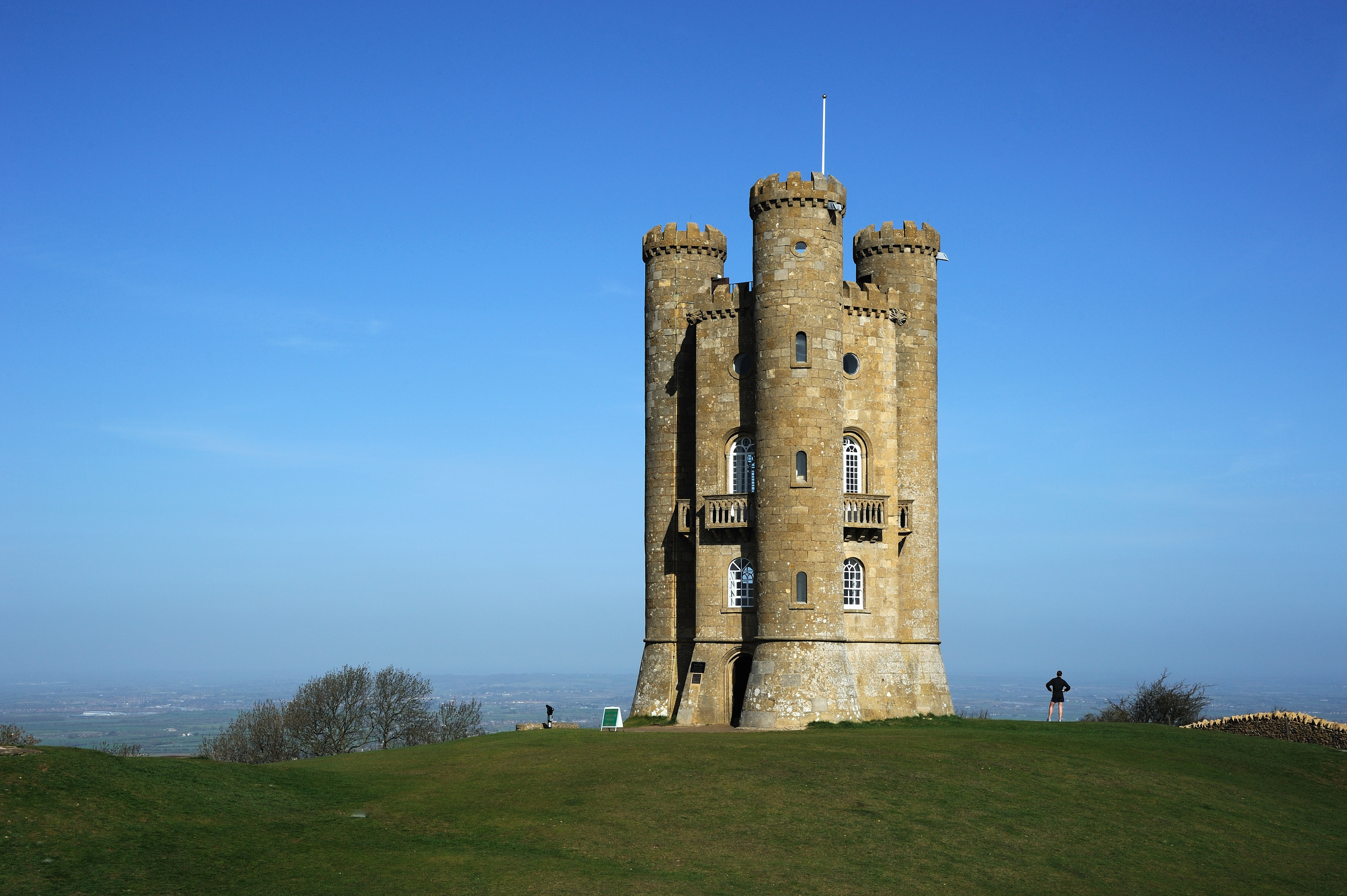
Broadway Tower (2012)

The 102-mile (164 km) trail runs northeast from Bath to Chipping Campden, through or near to the following towns: Old Sodbury, near Chipping Sodbury, Wotton-under-Edge, Dursley, Stroud, Painswick, Cranham, Leckhampton, Cheltenham, Winchcombe, Stanway and Broadway.

It passes numerous places of interest, including the site of the Battle of Lansdowne, the Somerset Monument, the Tyndale Monument, Sudeley Castle, Cleeve Hill, Hailes Abbey, and the Broadway Tower. With the exception of a small stretch around Broadway (which is in Worcestershire), the entire walk is within Gloucestershire (including South Gloucestershire) and Somerset (including Bath and North East Somerset).

== Other recreational use ==
- Besides being popular with walkers, the Cotswold Way is run annually as a 10-stage relay (the Cotswold Way Relay) from north to south, usually in late June or early July. The winning team typically takes an aggregate time of about 12 hours. It is run under Fell Runners' Association rules and organised by City of Bath Athletic Club. It is traditional for the first leg to start from St James Church, Chipping Campden promptly at 7am. The lead runners finish the final leg outside the doors of Bath Abbey at about 6pm.
- In September, the Cotswold Way is run as a single stage race from north to south, leaving Chipping Campden at noon on a Saturday and finishing in Bath from approximately 6am until 6pm the following day in front of Bath Abbey. The race is organised by Cotswold Running.
- The official record for running the Cotswold Way is held by Nathan Montegue of Swindon Harriers, who on 24 September 2014 ran from Chipping Campden to Bath in 19 hours and 31 minutes.

== Route and points of interest ==
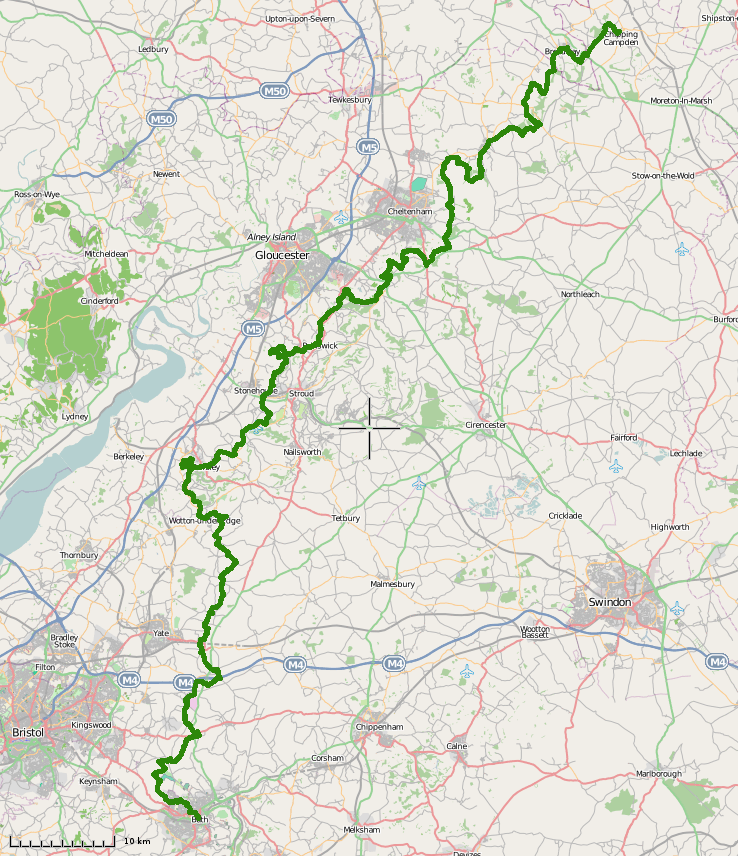
The route of the Cotswold Way

Point	Coordinates (Links to map resources)	OS Grid Ref	Notes
Start	51.375°N 2.359°W	ST751640	Bath
	51.426°N 2.401°W	ST721697	Battle of Lansdowne
	51.531°N 2.352°W	ST756815	Old Sodbury
Somerset Monument	51.587°N 2.329°W	ST772876	Hawkesbury, Gloucestershire
	51.635°N 2.355°W	ST755929	Wotton-under-Edge
Tyndale Monument	51.658°N 2.372°W	ST743956	Tyndale Monument at North Nibley
	51.678°N 2.350°W	ST758978	Dursley
	51.745°N 2.256°W	SO823052	Stroud
	51.786°N 2.193°W	SO867098	Painswick
	51.817°N 2.151°W	SO896132	Cranham
	51.864°N 2.074°W	SO949184	Leckhampton
Highest point	51.919°N 2.007°W	SO996245	Cleeve Hill
Sudeley Castle	51.947°N 1.956°W	SP031276	Sudeley Castle
	51.957°N 1.969°W	SP022287	Winchcombe
Hailes Abbey	51.968°N 1.928°W	SP050299	Hailes Abbey
	51.991°N 1.913°W	SP060326	Stanway
Broadway Tower	52.024°N 1.835°W	SP113362	Broadway Tower
Broadway Hill	52.035°N 1.855°W	SP100374	Broadway
End	52.053°N 1.773°W	SP156395	Chipping Campden

== See also ==
- Long-distance footpaths in the United Kingdom
