= Cranham, Gloucestershire =

Village in Gloucestershire, England

Coordinates: 51.8146°N 2.1522°W

Cranham
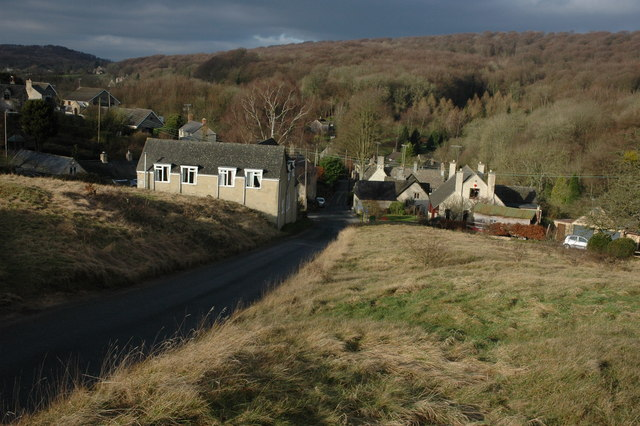
- Cranham viewed from the east

- Location within Gloucestershire
- Population: 451 (2011)
- OS grid reference: SO896129
- Civil parish: Cranham
- District: Stroud
- Shire county: Gloucestershire
- Region: South West
- Country: England
- Sovereign state: United Kingdom
- Post town: GLOUCESTER
- Postcode district: GL4
- Dialling code: 01452
- Police: Gloucestershire
- Fire: Gloucestershire
- Ambulance: South Western
- UK Parliament: Stroud

Cranham is a village in the English county of Gloucestershire. Forming part of the district of Stroud, it is to be found a mile or so east of the A46 road between Stroud and Cheltenham. The Cotswold Way long-distance footpath also runs nearby.

Composer Gustav Holst lived in Cranham for a while, and it was there, in the house now called 'Midwinter Cottage' (opposite the Black Horse Inn) that he wrote what is probably the best known tune for the Christmas carol In the Bleak Midwinter by Christina Rossetti. A Ham class minesweeper, HMS Cranham, was also named after the village.

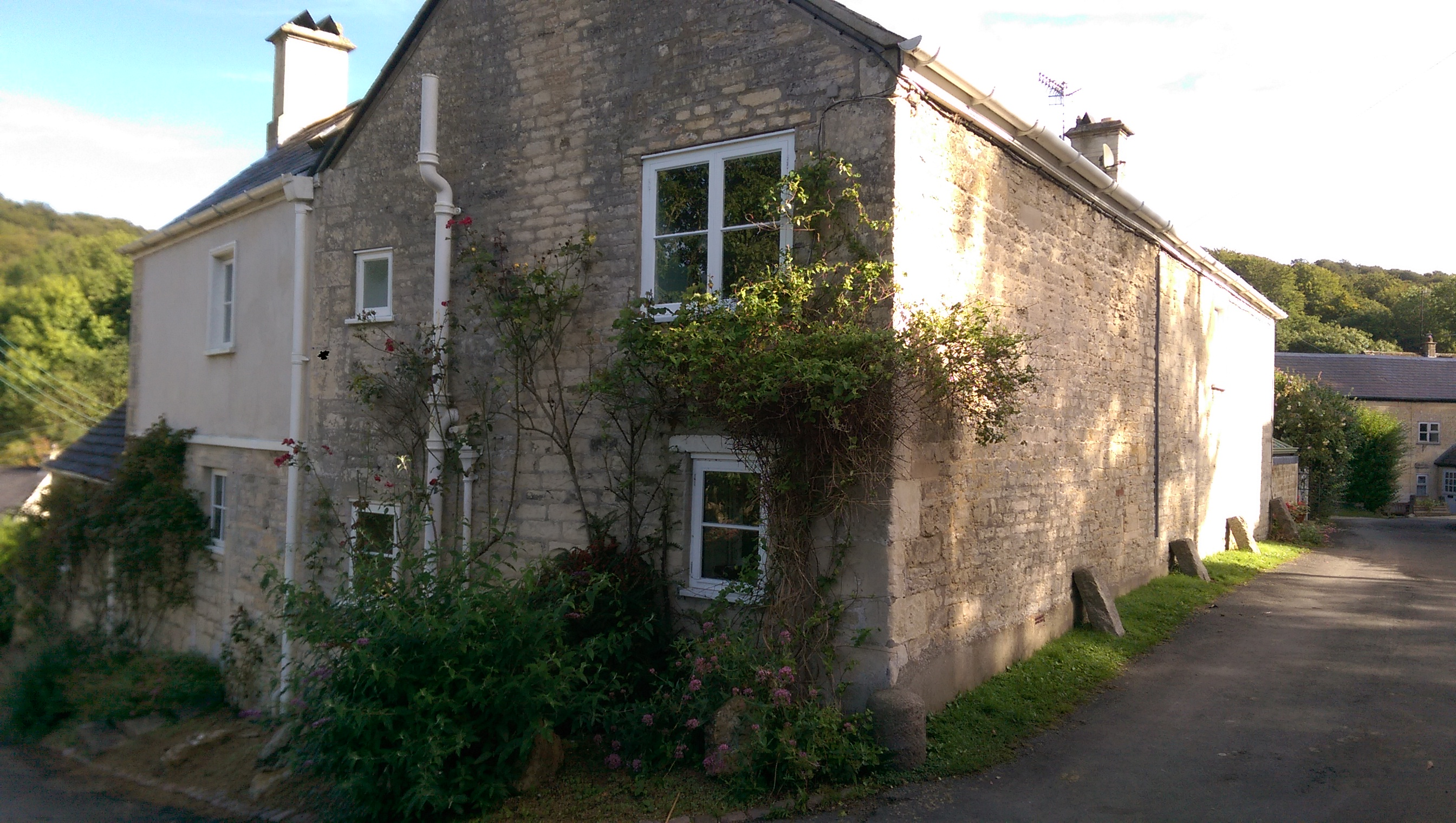
Midwinter, the house where Gustav Holst wrote the tune "Cranham" for In the Bleak Midwinter.

A Fairport Convention album, Gladys' Leap (1985), is named after the leap of local postwoman Gladys Hillier, who would jump over a local stream to avoid a long journey. The Ordnance Survey have renamed that place in her honour.

In 1948, Cranham Scout Centre was opened by the chief scout of the time. Over 2000 people attended the opening ceremony. Since then it has developed from a small campsite into an activity centre with indoor accommodation.

In 1949 George Orwell stayed at a nearby sanatorium, in his search for a relief if not a cure for the tuberculosis from which he was suffering and which would kill him six months later after his admission to University College Hospital. While in the sanatorium he sketched out in four pages of a notebook a short story to be called A Smoking Room Story, set in Burma. The story was never written. The sanatorium was closed in 1956 and most of the buildings were demolished. One was moved to the local Commune of Whiteway and is still in use as the Colony Hall.

In 2010, pop star Lily Allen bought Old Overton House, just outside Cranham, for a reported £3 million. Old Overton House is Grade II listed with the earliest part of the property dating back to the seventeenth century.
