= Kimsbury hill fort =

Hillfort in Gloucestershire, England

Coordinates: 51.8075°N 2.1910°W

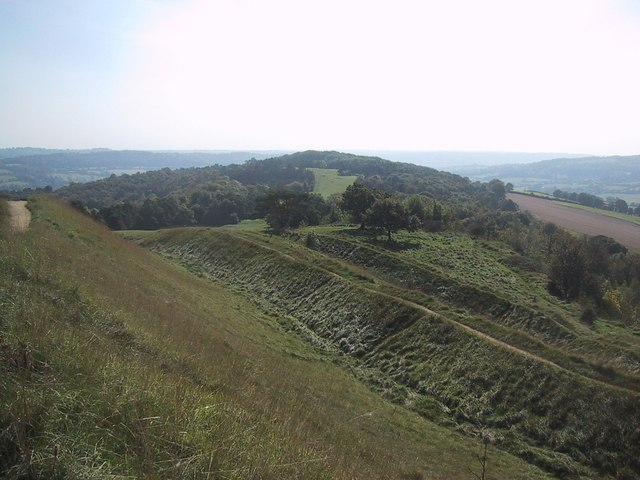
Ramparts of the hill fort

Kimsbury hill fort, also known as Castle Godwyn, Kimsbury Camp, Painswick Beacon or Painswick hill fort is an Iron Age hill fort on Painswick Beacon near Painswick in the Cotswolds, Gloucestershire England.

== Etymology ==
The name 'Kimsbury' is first attested in the period 1263–84 in the forms Kynemaresburia and Kynemaresbury. These names derive from an Old English name that can be reconstructed as *Cynemǣres burh ('Cynemǣr's fortification'). The name Castle Godwyn seems to be later: the hillfort is referred to simply as 'Castle' in 1327, with the name 'Castle Godwyn' first being attested in 1779.

== History and topography ==
The interior has been extensively quarried and parts are now a golf course, but much remains of the ramparts. Though there have been problems of erosion.

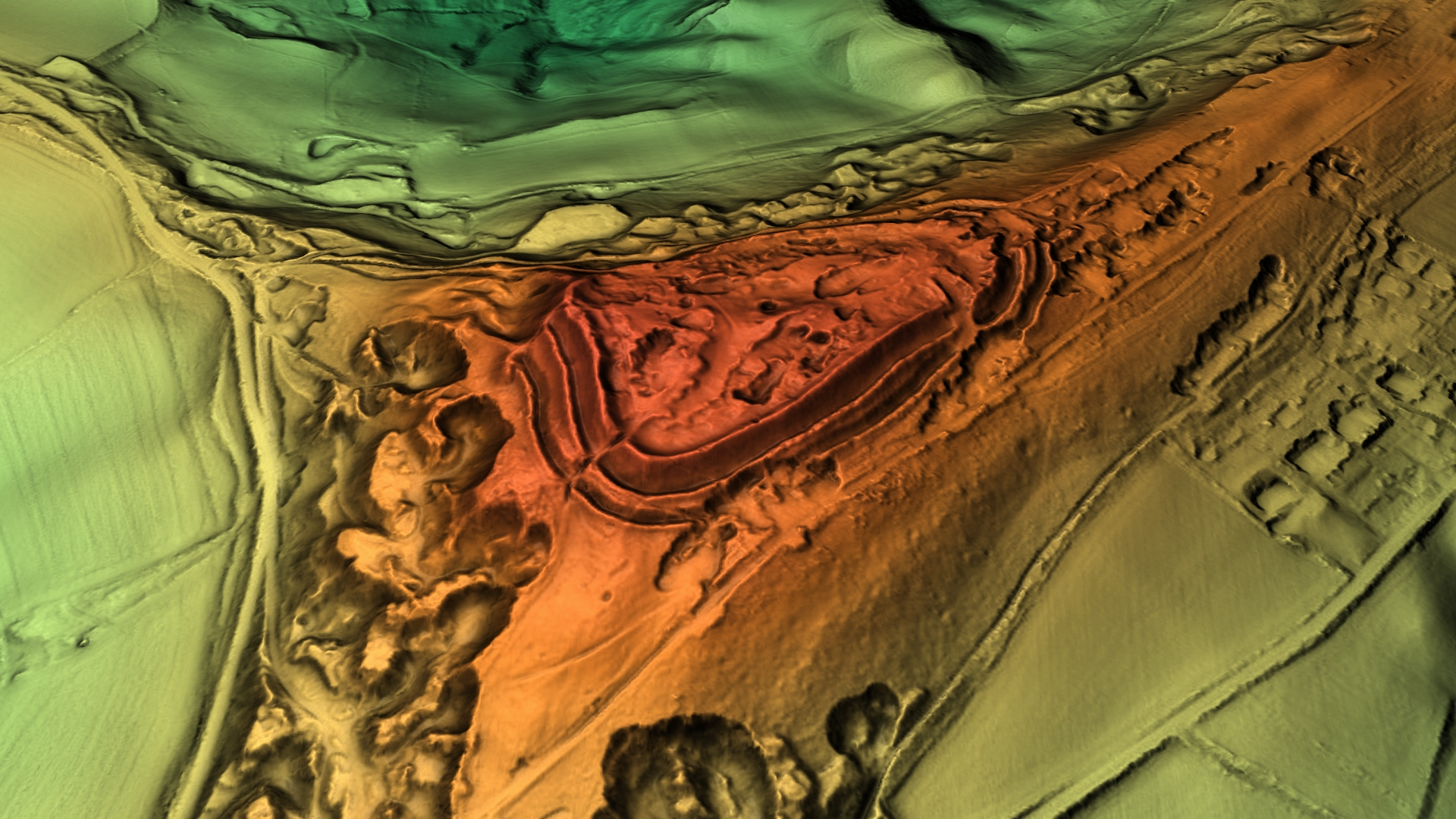
3D view of the digital terrain model

The hill fort has been dated to the first century BCE and is a scheduled monument. Pottery, coins and other archaeological finds have been found dating from the Iron Age through to the 3rd century CE in the Roman era.

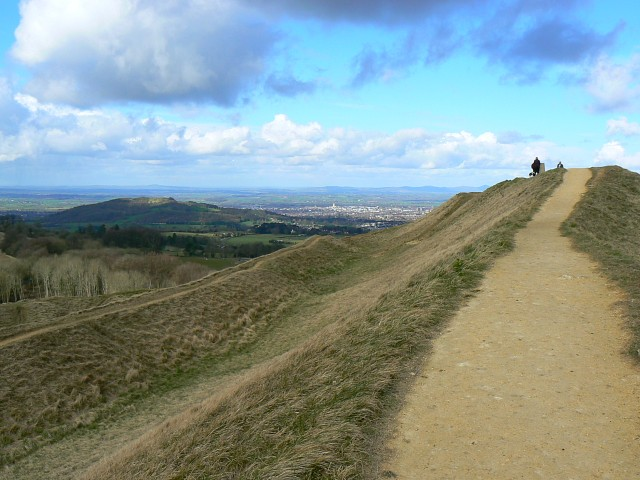
The ramparts with a view of Gloucester in the distance.

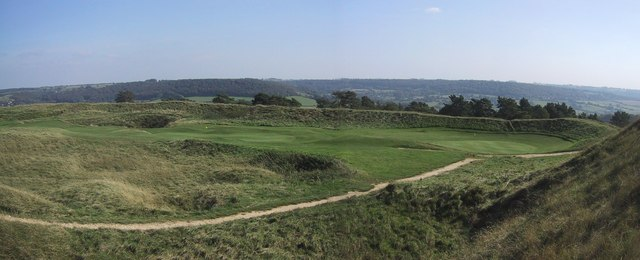
Part of Painswick Golf Course inside the inner rampart
