= Cleeve Hill, Gloucestershire =

Hill in Gloucestershire, England

Cleeve Hill
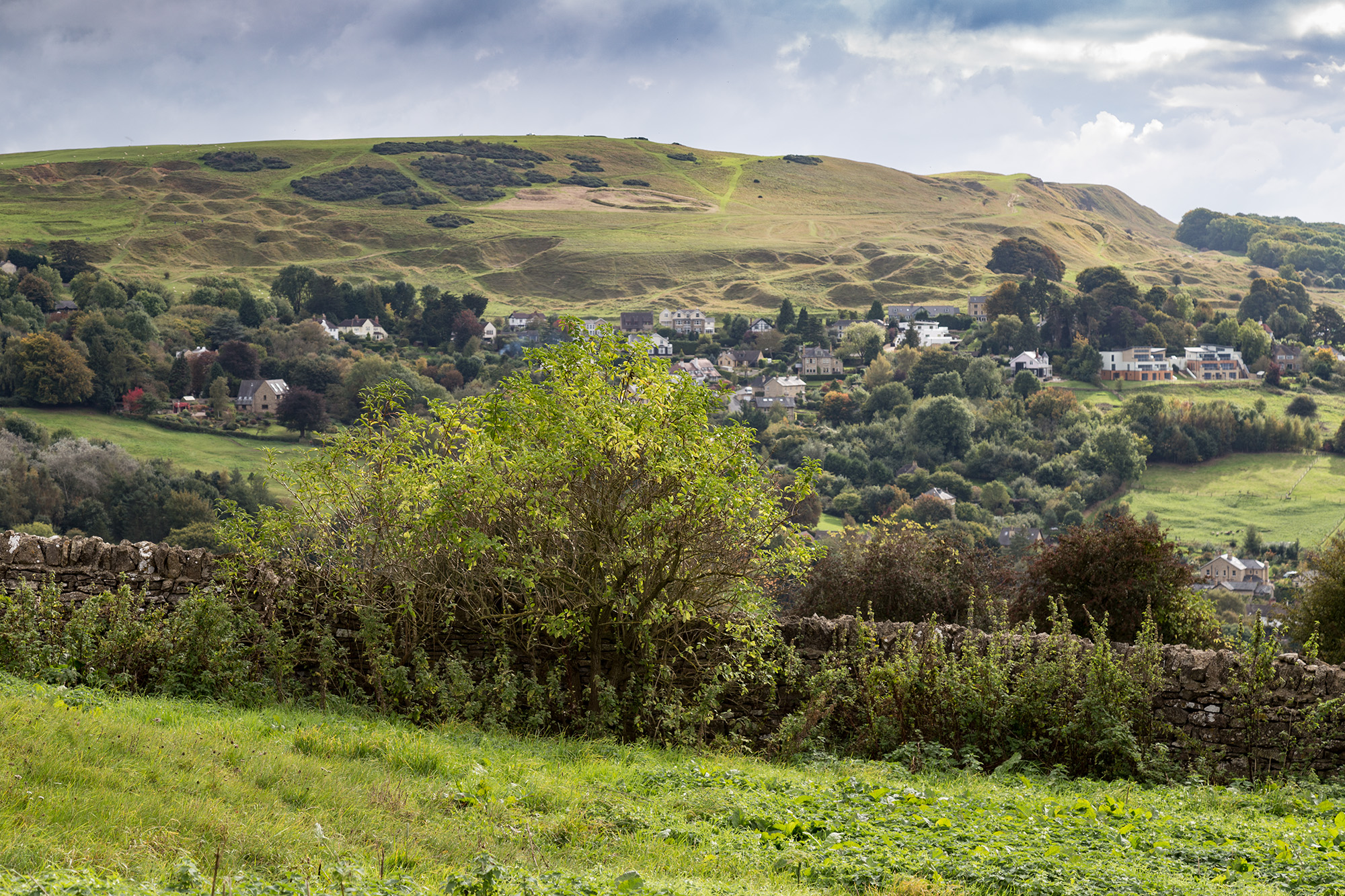
- Cleeve Hill from the north

Highest point
- Elevation: 330 m (1,080 ft)
- Prominence: 242 m (794 ft)
- Parent peak: The Wrekin
- Listing: Marilyn, County Top
- Coordinates: 51.920°N 2.007°W

Geography
- Location within Gloucestershire
- Location: Gloucestershire, England
- Parent range: Cotswolds
- OS grid: SO996246
- Topo map: OS Landranger 163 OS Explorer 179

Geology
- Rock age: Jurassic
- Mountain type: Sedimentary

Climbing
- Easiest route: Hike

Cleeve Hill (also known as Cleeve Cloud) is the highest point both of the Cotswolds hill range and of the county of Gloucestershire, at 330 m (1,080 ft). It is located on Cleeve Common, which is a Site of Special Scientific Interest (SSSI) looked after by a small charity called Cleeve Common Trust (formally Cleeve Common Board of Conservators). It commands a clear view to the west, over Cheltenham and the racecourse, over the River Severn and into Wales; and to the north over Winchcombe. It is a conspicuous outcrop on the edge of the limestone escarpment, (sometimes called the "Cotswold Edge"). It is crossed by the Cotswold Way footpath.

With the hill's south slopes draining to the River Coln, Cleeve Hill is the highest point in the drainage basin of the River Thames.

== Summit and views ==
The summit, at 330 m (1,080 ft), is an undistinguished point marked by a trig point on the relatively flat common south of the Hill. Because of this, it does not offer particularly wide-ranging views. To the north by the northwest, another summit at 1,033 ft (315 m) high boasts a toposcope and a trig point, offering far wider views. On an exceptionally clear day (for example a sunny day following a day of rain in spring or early summer), the view extends an impressive 90 miles (140 km) to Winsford Hill on Exmoor, Somerset.

== Hill fort and rock faces ==
Close to the summit is the Neolithic long barrow, Belas Knap. On its western scarp is an Iron Age hill fort.

The Hill bears one of the few rock faces in the area, Castle Rock, which is sound enough for rock climbing. The routes are short, difficult for their grade, and highly polished.

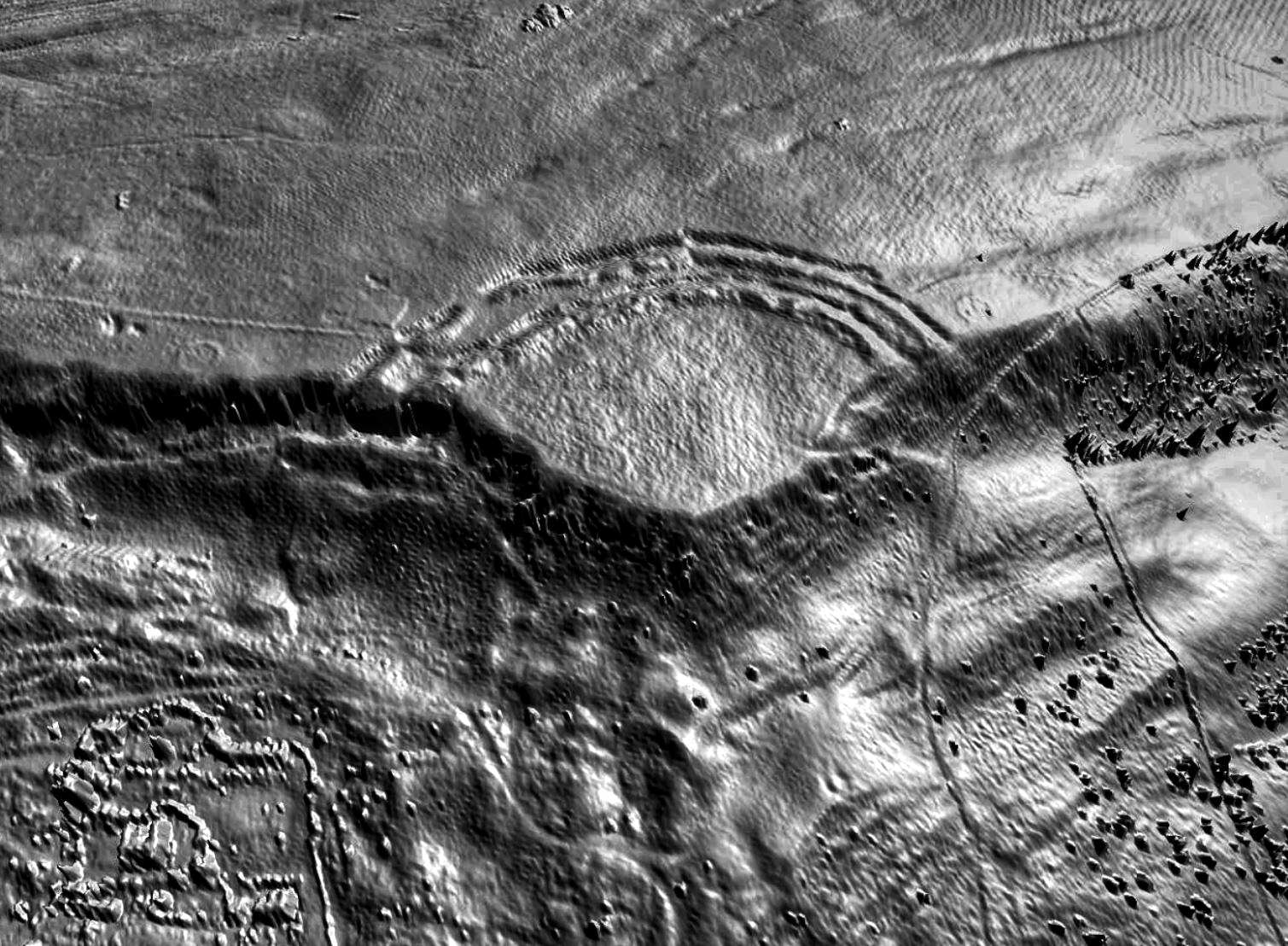
A lidar view of Cleeve Hill Hillfort.

== Golf course and Cleeve Common ==
The Hill has been home to a golf course since 1891. The course was the location of the 2010 Wells Cup that took place in June of that year.

Cleeve Common, which is sited on Cleeve Hill, is a designated Site of Special Scientific Interest by Natural England. It is recorded in the List of Sites of Special Scientific Interest in Gloucestershire.

== Routes to the highest point ==
From the south, a road for car access ends very close to the summit trig point, which is a short walk from the parking area. This can be reached from Cheltenham via Ham Hill and Aggs Hill, or from the village of Whittington, Gloucestershire.

To the north and to reach the more favourable viewpoint, a minor road leads off the B4632 to the golf course where there is parking in a disused quarry. From this area, the viewpoint is roughly a half-mile ascent on foot.

There are numerous other ways to reach the hill, and there is a well-maintained network of paths and tracks crossing it in many directions. Ordnance Survey maps show all routes, paths, and rights of way as well as the best viewpoints.

== SOTA ==
Cleeve Hill has a Summits On The Air (SOTA) reference of G/CE-001

== See also ==
- Broadway Tower - at the second highest point of the Cotswolds
