= Broadway Tower, Worcestershire =

Tower building in Worcestershire, England, United Kingdom

Coordinates: 52°1′27″N 1°50′9″W

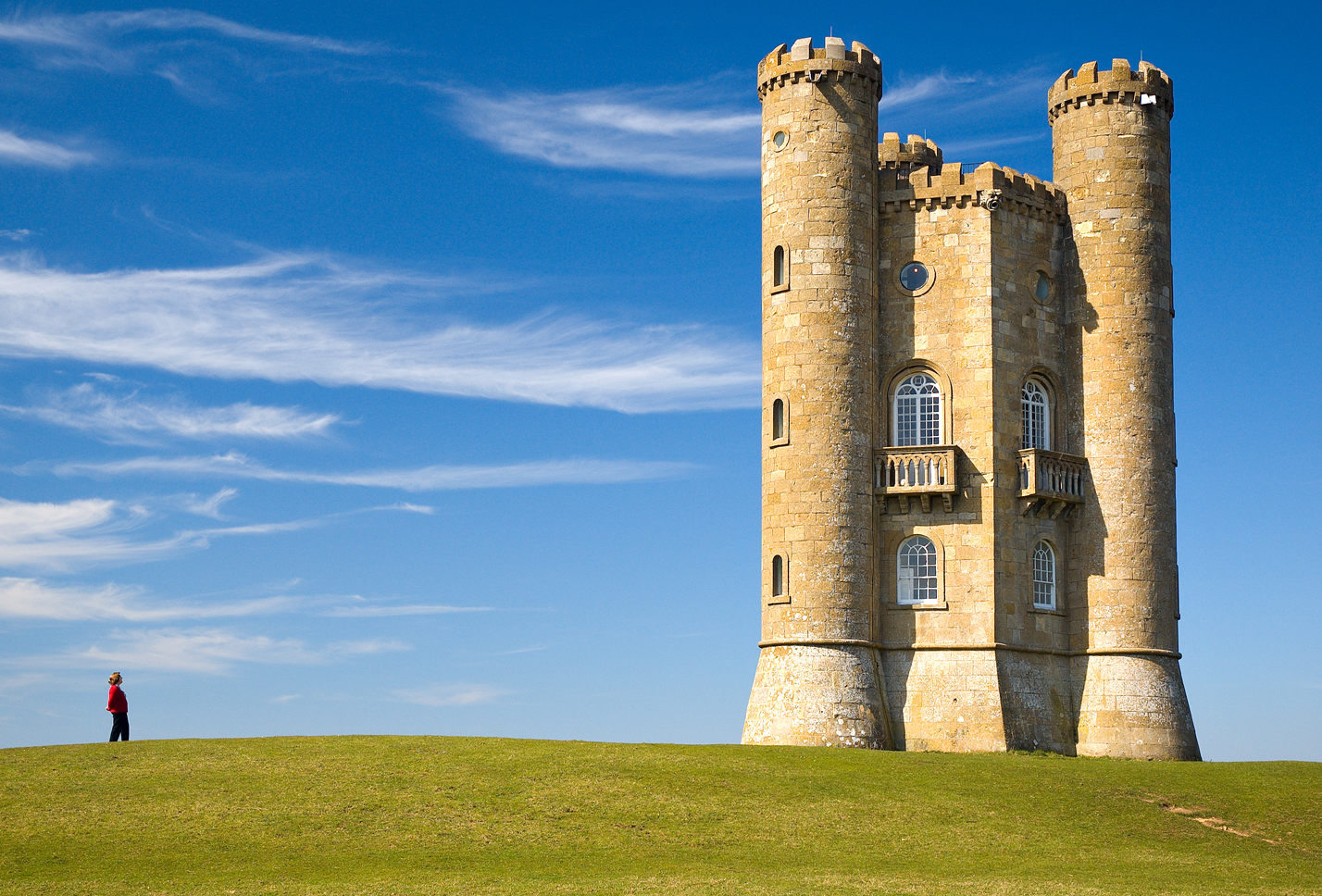
Broadway Tower in 2007

Broadway Tower is an 18th-century building near the village of Broadway, in the English county of Worcestershire. It is a Grade II listed building.

The tower is built of limestone ashlar and is four storeys high, hexagonal, with three round corner turrets, (Note: Actually towers, because they reach the ground.) battlements, and gargoyles. It stands above the village of Broadway on Broadway Hill, the second-highest point of the Cotswolds, at an elevation of 1,024 feet (312 m). The tower itself is 65 feet (20 m) tall. Although sometimes referred to as a folly, it is a functional building with interior rooms, the top three floors being used as a museum. The rooftop viewing platform can be accessed for good views. Two of the turrets each contain a spiral staircase leading from the ground to the roof.

The tower is on the Cotswold Way and can be reached by following this footpath from the A44 road at Fish Hill or by a steep climb out of Broadway village. It is now the centre of Broadway Tower Country Park, which has exhibitions open to the public for a fee, as well as a gift shop and restaurant.

== History ==
The Saxon-style tower was the brainchild of landscaper Capability Brown, designed by architect James Wyatt in 1794 in the form of a castle, and built by the 6th Earl of Coventry for his wife Barbara in 1798–1799. Broadway Hill was a beacon hill, where beacons were lit on special occasions. The tower was just visible from the Coventrys' home at Croome Court in south Worcestershire, about 15 miles (24 km) to the north-west, past the north escarpment of Bredon Hill. One theory for its construction says that Lady Coventry wondered if a beacon on the hill could be seen from her house. Another is that it served to signal to the Croome Court staff that the earl and his wife were returning from their Spring Hill estate.

From 1822 to 1862, the tower housed the private printing press of Sir Thomas Phillipps. The tower was known as the "Lighthouse of Wisdom," based on the voluminous works printed. By the mid-1870s, it was being rented by C. J. Stone and Cormell Price.

On 20 June 1837 the vantage point was used as a bonfire site for Queen Victoria's Jubilee. This was one of 2,548 celebratory bonfires lit across the country.

Thomas Phillipps ceased to use the Tower after his move to Cheltenham in 1863. It is recorded that the Tower was used by glove makers for a while before 1866 when Cormell Price took out a lease on the building as a holiday home for himself and his friends. Price was headmaster of the United Services College at Westward Ho! and a friend of artists William Morris, Edward Burne-Jones, and Dante Gabriel Rossetti; in 1876 Morris wrote in a letter to Aglaia Coronio that he was "today at Crom Price's Tower among the winds and the clouds".

Near the tower is a memorial to the crew of an A.W.38 Whitley bomber that crashed there during a training mission in June 1943.

In the late 1950s, an underground Royal Observer Corps monitoring post was built nearby. It was decommissioned in 1991, but has been restored, and is now one of the few such Cold War monitoring facilities in England still extant and accessible to visitors.

The Tower was built on the site of the Campden Wonder Executions.
