= Hells Angels MC criminal allegations and incidents in the United Kingdom =

Criminal incidents involving the Hells Angels Motorcycle Club in the UK

The Hells Angels Motorcycle Club, an international outlaw biker gang, has been involved in multiple crimes, alleged crimes, and violent incidents in the United Kingdom. According to the National Criminal Intelligence Service (NCIS), the British Hells Angels are involved in cannabis and amphetamine trafficking, as well as contract killing, extortion, prostitution, money laundering and credit card fraud. The NCIS called the Hells Angels "the fastest-growing organised crime group in the world" and also accused the club of being responsible for more assaults and murders than any other gang in the country.

== Background ==
Members of the San Francisco Hells Angels chapter were invited by the Beatles to visit England in 1968, and in May 1969, one of the first English Hells Angels chapter presidents, Peter "Buttons" Welsh, began "prospecting" for the San Francisco Hells Angels. On 30 July 1969, the first two HAMC charters in Europe were issued; the East London chapter was sanctioned by the San Francisco Hells Angels and the South London chapter was sponsored by the Hells Angels in Oakland. Both London chapters merged in 1973. By 1995, the club's United Kingdom faction consisted of twelve chapters and an estimated 250 members. In 2006, the British Hells Angels had a Nomad chapter (a chapter that covered the entire United Kingdom) along with chapters in London, Kent, Wessex, Lea Valley, Southampton, Tyne and Wear, Essex, Ashfield, Northampton, Manchester, Wolverhampton, Windsor and Wales.

The growth of the Hells Angels in the United Kingdom has been greatly aided by police indifference with the feeling being the Hells Angels were merely harmless. Nick Clark of the National Criminal Intelligence Service (NCIS) stated to the Canadian journalists Julian Sher and William Marsden that when he joined the NCIS in 1995 that he was the only one of two officers assigned full time to outlaw bikers. Clark told Sher and Marsden: "I was quite shocked to find that at the time outside of North America the U.K. has the biggest population of Hells Angels in the world". When Clark joined the NCIS in 1995, there were thirteen Hells Angels chapters in the United Kingdom and by 2006 the number had risen to sixteen. In turn, the British Hells Angels have waged a slick public relations campaign to promote the image of themselves as "lovable rogues". Despite the origins of the Hells Angels in the United States, the British Hells Angels have sought to wrap themselves up in the Union Jack both literally and metaphorically, depicting themselves as the ultra-patriotic defenders of British values. In June 2002, the London chapter led by the chapter president Alan "Snob" Fisher took part in the Queen's Golden Jubilee parade. Sher and Marsden wrote: "In no other country in the world do the Hells Angels get as easy a ride as they do in the UK—from politicians, the press, the public and even at times the police". Sher and Marsden noted that senior ministers in the Labour government of Tony Blair such as Hazel Blears, the Secretary of State for Crime Reduction, Policing, Community Safety and Counter-terrorism, openly took part in Hells Angels sponsored events without causing any controversy, which would not be the case in other parts of the Commonwealth such as Australia and Canada. Central to the image that the British Hells Angels seek to promote is the annual Bulldog Bash, where the club seeks to promote itself as patriotic and family friendly. The Bulldog Bash features young women serving as topless motorcycle washers; live entertainment; a 24-hour bar; an all-night dance tent; and a makeshift shopping village. The Daily Telegraph reported in August 2004 about the Hells Angels at the Bulldog Bash that what "a fine bunch of friendly, entertaining chaps they turned out to be".

Sher has stated: "I think England is one of the few countries where the myth of the Hells Angels as loveable rascals endures. I think it is in part because you have a biker culture—weekend warrior and more families associated with motorcycles. But if you look at the Hells Angels' history it is one of blood, violence, extortion and drugs. It is such an exclusive club that the excuse that it is the odd rotten apple to blame won't wash." Sher theorized that the British Hells Angels' reputation as "loveable rascals" has endured in part because of the club's publicity campaigns and in part because police task forces targeting motorcycle gangs have been disbanded.

Sher and Marsden wrote the "loudest" of all the Hells Angels chapters was the Kent chapter whose fortress-like clubhouse located on a farm in the Kentish countryside was more typical of the Canadian Hells Angels clubhouses than the type normally found in the United Kingdom. The best known British Hells Angel, Ian "Maz" Harris, was a member of the Kent chapter. Harris held the rare distinction of being a Hells Angel with a PhD, awarded at Warwick University for his dissertation "Myth and Reality: Motorcycle Subcultures". Harris served as the chief spokesman for the British Hells Angels and often appeared on television to defend the reputation of his club. Clark said of him: "I had a lot admiration for him as my nemesis". Harris owned the Kent Custom Bike Shop and was described as a successful businessman up until his death in 2000. Most of the members of the Kent chapter run businesses with Paul "Herman the German" McLean running a Home Services company; Andrew Messer owning several Cottage Craft stores; and Brian "Boz" Raybould running Boz Engineering. The prosperity of the Kent chapter is typical of the British Hells Angels. A police report noted: "Houses were purchased by chapters...Individual members who were either unemployed or employed in low paid manual labour, were able to purchase houses for themselves; they acquired high value Harley-Davidson motorcycles which they retain as status symbols".

Graham Weeks of the NCIS said of the British Hells Angels: "They are up up there with the Triads and the Mafia and the East Europeans. They are up there with the best organised crime people in the world". Weeks stated that the British Hells Angels are closely connected with the Hells Angels chapters in the Netherlands, Sweden, New Zealand, Australia, and the United States and are involved in selling amphetamine, cocaine and ecstasy. Weeks told Sher and Marsden: "I know they're dealing large amounts of drugs. They're trafficking firearms. And we've never been able to hurt them". Weeks credits the success of the Hells Angels to corruption as he stated: "They are very crafty the way they invite people into their social world so they can use them—solicitors, accountants, telephone employees, Inland Revenue, police employees. They will try to court any type of civil servant that can help". A police raid on a clubhouse in the West Midlands revealed that the Hells Angels knew all of the radio frequencies used by the police along with a map showing which the areas for every police car and call sign. A raid made in the aftermath of the Battersea Arts Centre incident revealed the Hells Angels had a number of secret police documents and information from the Police National Computer. Two police officers were sacked on the suspicion of selling documents to the Hells Angels.

In 1998, the NCIS disbanded its anti-biker unit under the grounds that was not necessary. The NCIS reportedly spent an estimated one third of its annual budget on gathering intelligence about biker gangs. Many policemen have criticised the disbanding of the unit as causing a "complete fragmentation of intelligence" as there is no longer one office dedicated entirely to the Hells Angels. Weeks told Sher and Marsden: "In this country the senior officers and the government aren't bothered by the Hells Angels and the biker gangs...The Americans and the Canadians regard it as a war; soldiers in a war against serious and violent crime. In this country, the police don't regard that way. Here you just work on them a couple of years and then you go on to other things. Bikers don't. They stay loyal to each other for a lifetime or as long as they choose. And they develop an expertise, discipline and intelligence gathering. And they are far better at than we are because they stick to it". One serving officer who asked to be unnamed told Sher and Marsden in 2006: "NCIS has been absolutely castigated because there has now been a resurgence of bikers in the Midlands involved in the meth trade and there is nobody in the NCIS who has the intelligence on it—all the stuff there is five years old".

== England ==
The first Hells Angels chapter in the United Kingdom was founded in London on 30 July 1969. The HAMC has established seventeen chapters in England, with membership based primarily around the London, Manchester, Liverpool, Essex, Kent, Sussex and Tyne and Wear areas.

=== Violent incidents ===
Three Hells Angels were jailed in Colchester for threatening behaviour likely to cause a breach of the peace in the aftermath of the August 1971 Weeley Festival, at which 39 club members fought with stall holders. Hells Angels' motorcycles were vandalised and a number of bikers needed medical treatment, some for severe injuries, after the Hells Angels destroyed catering equipment using iron bars.

On 1 November 1972, three Hells Angels were sentenced to prison for their part in the rape of a fourteen-year-old girl who was seized from the street and sexually assaulted in front of laughing teenagers in a local café during a national Hells Angels convention in Winchester. Ian "Moose" Everest was convicted of raping the girl and sentenced to seven years, while Stephen "Boots" Ripley and Anthony "Chas" Mann were each given four years for aiding and abetting Everest. In sentencing the trio, judge Sir George Waller said: "We have heard of the Hells Angels as an utterly evil organisation which is vile and corrosive of young people. But I do not sentence you for being members of the Hells Angels. No doubt the evil nature of that organisation has led you into this situation". In 1982, at a Hells Angels party in Cookham Dean, a woman was dragged off the streets and tied to the ground via four stakes and proceeded to strip naked as the prelude to a gang rape. However, a fight broke when Hells Angel started to photograph the proceedings despite orders not to, which led to shootings.

Hells Angels member David Richards and his girlfriend were sentenced to a minimum of sixteen years' imprisonment in December 1984 for the murder of 16-year-old Michael Groves, who suffered 56 injuries in an attack with a hammer, a knife and a wrench at the couple's flat in West London. Richards wrote "Hells Angels" on the wall with Groves's blood. After serving 21 years of his sentence, and months before his scheduled release, Richards absconded from the open prison at HM Prison Sudbury in May 2006, fleeing to Ireland, where he was jailed for three months for robbery without his status as a fugitive in the UK coming to the attention of Irish authorities. He subsequently returned to England, settling in Wolverhampton. On 6 June 2014, Richards was apprehended at his home in Penn after the Metropolitan Police received a tip-off regarding his whereabouts, and he was sentenced to 2 1/2 years in prison on 1 September 2014 after pleading guilty to escaping from custody.

In 1985, the McSorley family were terrorised out of their house following a campaign by the Windsor chapter after they called the police to complain that they were playing their music too loud at a party at their clubhouse. Pat McSorley stated that he decided to sell his house after the Hells Angels threatened to kill his wife and children if he did not leave Windsor immediately. A police report noted: "There was swift and severe punishment handed out to any person or group displaying the Death's Head without authority". A man in Reading had "a large, severe and untreated burn" on his right arm as he was not a Hells Angel, but had a tattoo of the Angels' death's head logo, which members of the Reading chapter had cut and burned off.

On 2 April 1987, Rita Parminter, a grandmother also fondly known as "Apricot Lil" due to the colour of her hair was sexually assaulted and strangled to death by former Hells Angels member Leonard Tedham in Hastings. Tedham was sentenced to life in prison for the murder in 1988.

In January 2019, Matthew Barnes, president of the Sussex chapter of the Hells Angels, was formally cleared of allegedly assaulting Christopher "Swaggers" Harrison. Harrison alleged that he had been assaulted by Barnes and other Hells Angels members after refusing to join the club when he was found unconscious and with his eyes ruptured outside a pub in Hastings in February 2016. Barnes' co-defendant Oliver Wilkinson was also acquitted following a trial in August 2018.

A Hells Angels member allegedly assaulted a toilet attendant after being caught using cocaine in a pub in Maidstone on 18 May 2019. A group of six men believed to be Hells Angels were in the pub that night.

49 people were arrested on suspicion of drug offences and possession of offensive weapons during a three-day event held to mark the 50th anniversary of the Hells Angels founding in the UK which took place in Surrey and Sussex from 30 May to 1 June 2019 and culminated in a mass ride of around 100 motorcyclists from Pease Pottage to Brighton. The majority of those arrested were either cautioned or released without charge; of the twelve people charged – five Germans, three Hungarians, one Swiss, one French, one Czech and one Greek man – at least seven were given suspended prison sentences. 27 international members of the Hells Angels were also prevented from entering to UK to attend the event due to previous convictions.

Members of the Hells Angels' Sunderland-based Tyne and Wear chapter took part in counter protests against a Black Lives Matter demonstration near Grey's Monument in Newcastle upon Tyne in June 2020. Disorder and fighting between the two groups resulted in police officers, dogs and horses, as well as member of the public, being injured, and 38 people were charged with violent disorder. In May 2022, Hells Angels members Christopher Butters and Colin Green, the Tyne and Wear chapter president, were sentenced to 31 and 29 months' imprisonment, respectively. Club prospect Matthew Chapman was also sentenced to 30 months'. Green died at HM Prison Northumberland on 24 May 2022. A post-portem report concluded that he died of heart disease.

On 22 August 2020, a car was driven through the wall of the Hells Angels' Manchester chapter clubhouse in Cadishead.

=== Gang wars ===
In the late 1960s and early 1970s, a number of homegrown British outlaw biker clubs, in reaction to the international publicity of the Hells Angels in the United States, began adopting the club's name, red-on-white colour scheme or a variation of the "death's head" insignia. A number of these unsanctioned clubs from the South and West of England amalgamated and were invited to join the official "All England chapter" of the Hells Angels. An unchartered club in Windsor refused to join the All England chapter and continued to wear identical replicas of the Hells Angels' "colours". On 15 April 1979, a group of up to thirty Hells Angels armed with guns, axes and knives ambushed fifteen members of the rogue Windsor Hells Angels who were sleeping in a car park near Brockenhurst. Five Windsor members were injured, while some others escaped into the New Forest countryside. Richard Sharman, the leader of the Windsor chapter, survived being shot three times, once in the head, Richard Jessop suffered a fractured skull, and another man received a shotgun wound to the buttocks. 24 Hells Angels members were convicted for the attack and were imprisoned or given suspended sentences in 1980.

The Windsor chapter officially became Hells Angels in 1985 shortly after its only black member, John Mikkelsen, had died. Black men are not permitted to join the club and Mikkelsen's membership was a significant factor in the Windsor chapter failing to be sanctioned earlier. Mikkelsen died in police custody after being arrested in Bedfont on suspicion of car theft on 15 July 1985. He was clubbed over the head by a policeman in order to force him to release a stranglehold on another officer and subsequently choked to death on his own vomit. Seven police officers, including a chief inspector, were suspended from duty after an inquest jury in West London coroner's court ruled on 27 March 1986 that Mikkelsen had been unlawfully killed. On 15 December 1986, the seven policemen began a successful appeal in the High Court of Justice to challenge the verdict, claiming that the jury's finding was not "supported by the evidence". The application to quash the initial jury verdict was opposed by coroner John Burton and the family and friends of Mikkelsen. The verdict was subsequently changed to manslaughter.

==== Vikings ====
Another unsanctioned motorcycle gang using the club's name was the Hells Angels Vikings, formed in Surrey in 1969. The Hells Angels Vikings were "in a constant state of war" with the official Hells Angels chapter in London and were renamed the Vikings in 1975. The Vikings, who continued using a "death's head" logo similar to the Hells Angels', refused an invitation to join the Angels' All England chapter in 1980.

Hells Angels member David Wyeth, along with an accomplice, carried out an assault and attempted to steal the "colours" of a Vikings member in Maidstone on 7 May 2018. The victim suffered a fractured vertebrate. Wyeth pleaded guilty to affray and was given a twelve-week prison sentence in August 2019.

On 7 November 2018, members of the Hells Angels' Slough chapter and the affiliated Red Devils ambushed six members of the Vikings and their support group the Wargs Brotherhood who were meeting at the Wargs' clubhouse in Blindley Heath. A total of thirteen men are believed to have been involved in the attack, using knives, baseball bats and other weapons, which left the six rival bikers wounded; several suffered head injuries, all except one were stabbed, and one was disemboweled. The conflict between the groups allegedly began when the Hells Angels sought to open a chapter in Surrey and tried to entice the Wargs into switching their allegiance from the Vikings to the Hells Angels. When it became clear that the Vikings would resist any attempt to persuade the Wargs to leave them, the Hells Angels decided to launch the attack. Seven prospective Hells Angels and Red Devils members – Przemyslaw Korkus, Jimi Kidd, Bartosz Plesniak, Piotr Zamijewski, Ladislav Szalay, Tamas Tomacsek and David Jacobs – were convicted of multiple offences and each sentenced to fourteen years in prison in October 2019.

==== Luton Town MIGs ====
Members of the Hells Angels' Lea Valley chapter took part in a mass brawl against a group from the Luton Town MIGs hooligan firm at the Blockers Arms public house in Luton in May 1990. The MIGs gained the upper hand, forcing the bikers from the pub. With further violence seeming inevitable, undercover police officers were assigned to observe key figures on both sides. However, the MIGs decided to pay the Hells Angels £2,000 in compensation rather than face the continued threat of retaliation.

==== Satans Slaves ====
The Hells Angels' English Nomads chapter was formed on 25 February 1989. The Nomads chapter became involved in a turf war with the Southampton chapter of the Satans Slaves, which began after Hells Angels members Stephen Harris and Barry Burn were fired upon during a trip to Bristol. Nomads chapter president Harris was wounded in the arm while Burn escaped injury. Another Hells Angel, David McKenzie, was stabbed eight times after being attacked outside a pub in Gloucester months later. In April 1991, Stephen "Grumps" Cunningham, a leading member of the Nomads chapter and major amphetamine and cannabis dealer, lost his right hand when a car bomb targeting a Satans Slave biker exploded prematurely in Southampton. The Satans Slaves member targeted by Cunningham was the leader of a rival drug enterprise. Cunningham sported a new patch, consisting of two Nazi-style SS lightning bolts below the words "Filthy Few", after he recovered from attempting to set the bomb. According to the book Gangs: A Journey into the Heart of the British Underworld by Tony Thompson (a crime correspondent for The Observer), the "Filthy Few" patch is awarded only to those who have committed or are prepared to commit murder on the club's behalf.

==== Outlaws ====
The Wolverhampton Hells Angels chapter became involved in a longrunning dispute with the Derby-based Road Tramps motorcycle gang over control of the "Rock and Blues Custom show", a lucrative annual motorcycle festival which the Road Tramps founded in 1983. A few weeks before the opening of the July 1992 edition of the event, the Derbyshire Constabulary received intelligence indicating that the Hells Angels planned to attack rival bikers at the show and police subsequently forbade the Road Tramps from allowing any Angels to attend. The Wolverhampton Hells Angels were simultaneously involved in a feud with the Cycle Tramps biker gang of Birmingham, which resulted in dozens of assaults, numerous stabbings and shootings, and several mass armed brawls in the early 1990s. A man from Wolverhampton was charged with attempted murder after three Cycle Tramps members were shot and wounded when their car was fired on by a passing vehicle in April 1992. Prior to the 1992 "Rock and Blues Custom show", the Cycle Tramps and the Road Tramps merged with five other bikers clubs — the multi-chapter Ratae, the Pagans of Leamington Spa, the Stafford Eagles, the Road Runners and Leicester's Pariahs — to form a collation against the Hells Angels. The various gangs united to become the Midlands Outlaws, whose "colours" consisted of a skull wearing Native American headdress featuring seven different coloured feathers, with each colour representing one of the founding clubs. In August 1992, a former Cycle Tramps member survived being shot with a sawn-off shotgun through the letter box on the front door of his home. At the Hells Angels' annual Bulldog Bash in Long Marston two weeks later, two Angels kidnapped, tortured and interrogated a member of an independent motorcycle gang who was friendly with members of the Midlands Outlaws, forcing him into revealing information about the reasons behind the Outlaws' formation and future plans. The Midlands Outlaws later began "prospecting" for the American Outlaws Association — the Hells Angels' biggest rival internationally — and "patched over" to join the A.O.A. in February 2000.

During the late 1990s, the Hells Angels waged a two-year war against the Outcasts biker gang, which was centred in London and East Anglia. The two clubs had historically coexisted without violence; police theorized that the Hells Angels' attempts to nullify the Outcasts started after they were warned by the club's American leadership to combat the rise of rival motorcycle gangs or have their charter revoked. Another theory is that the clubs were engaged in a conflict over control of London drug and prostitution rackets. The dispute began when the Outcasts tried to absorb a small Hertfordshire club, the Lost Tribe, in June 1997. Concerned that such a move would make the Outcasts their equal in numbers, the Hells Angels themselves then laid claim to the Lost Tribe. 22 Outcasts members defected to the Hells Angels when the Angels began coercing Outcasts into "patching over". In November 1997, two members of the Outcasts were arrested in possession of loaded shotguns, allegedly on their way to confront the Angels. On 31 January 1998, in the Battersea Arts Centre incident, Outcasts members David "Flipper" Armstrong and Malcolm "Terminator" St Clair were killed after being ambushed by members of the Essex Hells Angels chapter, known as the "Hatchet Crew", at the "Rockers Reunion" concert at the Battersea Arts Centre in Battersea, south London. Armstrong was dragged from his motorcycle and hacked to death with axes and knives; St Clair raced to his aid but was stabbed eight times. A third Outcast, David "Diddy" Traherne, and an Outcast-turned-Angel, Barry Hollingsworth, were also injured in the attack, which was co-ordinated using microphone headsets. Acting under orders from the leaders of the Hells Angels' 14 chapters nationwide, approximately 40 members armed with pickaxe handles, hammers, machetes, knives, iron bars and axes were present at the annual "Rockers Reunion", which was traditionally attended by the Outcasts. Outcasts members also provided security at the event.

The Metropolitan Police launched Operation Middlezoy, an investigation into the incident, which resulted in Hells Angels bikers Hollingsworth, Ronald "Gut" Wait and Raymond Woodward being charged with murder. Charges against Hollingsworth and Woodward were withdrawn after two protected witnesses in the case, an Outcast and his wife, refused to give evidence due to the police invertedly revealing their names to the solicitor for the defence. Hollingsworth and Woodward, who were Hells Angels "prospects" at the time of the attack, were subsequently rewarded with full membership. Essex chapter vice-president Wait was convicted of conspiring to cause grievous bodily harm and sentenced to fifteen years imprisonment at the Old Bailey on 23 November 1998. The murder charge against him was dismissed by prosecutors when the jury failed to reach a verdict. The 18st (114 kg) Wait, who suffered from angina and diabetes, died in prison of a heart attack in 2001. Outcasts sergeant-at-arms Richard "Stitch" Anderton was arrested with a .45 caliber Smith & Wesson revolver in his waistband after police detectives stopped him in his car in Poole in June 1998. A subsequent search of his home by the National Crime Squad (NCS) uncovered additional weapons including an Uzi submachine gun, an AK-47 assault rifle and a rocket launcher as well as hundreds of shotgun cartridges, thousands of 9 mm rounds, amphetamines, cannabis and ecstasy. Police believed the arsenal was intended to be used in the Outcasts' war against the Hells Angels. Following his arrest, Anderton, a former Angels "prospect", claimed that he had moved from Essex to Dorset and armed himself after learning that he was listed on a Hells Angels "death list" of Outcasts who were to be "killed on site". He was imprisoned for three years in June 1999. In March 1999, a fertilizer and petrol bomb was found at the clubhouse of the Hells Angels' Lea Valley chapter in Luton, and there was an attempted arson attack on a motorcycle shop owned by Angels biker Ian "Maz" Harris in Kent. Two Outcasts were then shot close to their Bow, east London clubhouse in June 1999. Both survived but refused to co-operate with police. The Outcasts disbanded as a result of the conflict, aligning themselves with the Midlands Outlaws and joining the February 2000 "patch over" to the American Outlaws Association.

The Outlaws, who are mainly based in the West Midlands, have since become the Hells Angels' main rivals in the United Kingdom since opening chapters in the country in February 2000. On 12 August 2001, a Canadian Hells Angels member was shot three times in the leg and wounded after shots were fired from a dark-coloured saloon car on the M40 motorway as he left the Bulldog Bash, held at the Shakespeare County Raceway in Long Marston. He refused to make a statement to the police and the shooting went unsolved. In an identical incident on 12 August 2007, Hells Angels member Gerry Tobin was shot dead as he rode his motorcycle home to London, where he worked as a Harley-Davidson service manager, from the Bulldog Bash. Two bullets were fired from a Rover car which drove up alongside him as he sped down the M40 motorway, one hitting him in the head. Seven members of the Outlaws, the entire South Warwickshire chapter, were convicted over his murder and sentenced to a total of 191 years in prison. It is believed that Tobin was killed due to the fact that the Hells Angels-run Bulldog Bash is held in Outlaws territory, and that the killing may have been sanctioned by Outlaws leadership in the United States. A brawl between up to thirty Hells Angels and Outlaws members took place at Birmingham Airport on 20 January 2008 after the two groups had found themselves together on a flight from Alicante, Spain, with police recovering various weapons including knuckledusters, hammers, a machete and a meat cleaver. Three Hells Angels and four Outlaws were convicted as a result.

=== Drug trafficking ===
The Hells Angels became involved in a dispute between a Dutch drug trafficker and a Liverpool crime family in late 1992. The Liverpudlian gang had made a significant down payment on a large shipment of cannabis from Amsterdam which was seized by British customs officials during a routine check of a Dutch-registered ship docking at Manchester. Under the terms of the agreement, the drugs were no longer the responsibility of the Dutchman once they had left Dutch waters but the Liverpool family refused to pay the £140,000 owed and so the trafficker, a former Hells Angel, contracted the club to collect the debt owed to him. Three Hells Angels – Wolverhampton chapter vice-president Michael "Long Mick" Rowledge, Andrew Trevis, also from Wolverhampton, and Windsor chapter member Stephen Pollock – travelled to Aintree on 7 October 1992 and agreed to meet the Liverpudlians outside a supermarket in the Old Roan area. While the Hells Angels waited in their car, a gunman approached and shot Rowledge four times in the chest, killing him, before escaping in a waiting vehicle. In 1993, Delroy Davies was acquitted after a trial at Liverpool Crown Court and Thomas Dures was jailed for thirteen years for conspiracy to murder.

The British Hells Angels have a close association with the Canadian Hells Angels, and the Angels' Montreal chapter was involved in shipping cocaine to the Angels' London chapter. In 1994, the Montreal chapter shipped 558 kilograms of Columbian cocaine to the London chapter and unknowingly recruited an undercover agent of the Royal Canadian Mounted Police who posed as an unscrupulous Canadian businessman living in London who agreed to provide the necessary import licenses to allow the cocaine to be shipped to London. On 17 August 1994, a ship loaded with the cocaine left Barranquilla while two members of the Montreal chapter, Pierre Rodrique and David Rouleau, were sent to London to pick up the payment when the ship arrived.

Pierre Rodrigue and David Rouleau, two Canadian Hells Angels from the Sherbrooke chapter, were arrested by British police in London at the request of the Royal Canadian Mounted Police (RCMP) in February 1995 before being extradited to Canada and sentenced to fourteen years' imprisonment for conspiring to smuggle 558 kilograms of cocaine into the UK in a scheme also involving the Rizzuto crime family and the Cali Cartel. Nick Clark of the National Criminal Intelligence Service stated: "When the rooms were searched, they found contact lists for all the UK chapters. We suspected they were going to use that for a distribution network".

The Swedish and Dutch Hells Angels frequently visited the United Kingdom to meet members of the British chapters and vice-versa. Marco Hegger of the Dutch Nomad chapter often visited the United Kingdom along with Colombia with the latter nation being well known as a source of cocaine. The British Hells Angels have also had close links with the chapters in South Africa, which is a major source of marihuana. In South Africa, a pound of marihuana which sells for £20 sells for £3,000 in Britain. In 1998, a police report stated: "Information was received from a source that the Johannesburg Hells Angels have been exporting cannabis to the U.K.". A South African Hells Angel had been arrested in Swaziland for seeking to buy marihuana on a massive scale as the Johannesburg chapter had received an order from the British Hells Angels for marihuana. Two members of the Johannesburg chapter on their way back to South Africa were arrested at Heathrow airport on 6 November 1998 with some £25,000 in their possession, which was the payment for a shipment of marihuana which had smuggled into Great Britain from South Africa inside wrought-iron furniture. The resulting investigation that the British and South African Hells Angels had set up a trading company, a furniture company, and a farm in Swaziland for smuggling marihuana into Britain. As part of the investigation, the police seized 1.2 tons of South African marihuana on the Tilbury Docks in London. Sher and Marsden wrote: "But non doubts that the vast majority of drug shipments from Africa—not to mention Amsterdam and Colombia—get in unnoticed and uninterrupted". Clark admitted: "It's a challenge. At the end of the day, we're dealing with some very clever people. They're not bleeding idiots".

=== Arms trafficking ===
The Kent chapter of the Hells Angels opened up a puppet club in 1997 called the Patriots that was only open to current or former servicemen. The Patriots had its origins in another Hells Angels puppet club founded in the 1980s called Soldier Blue that was only open to members of the British Army. The Soldier Blue Motorcycle Club was then made open to members of the Royal Air Force and Royal Navy, which led to the name change. The police believe that the Patriots Motorcycle Club exists to steal weapons from armories.

In 1998, the Belgian police seized a number of arms from a Hells Angel chapter, some of which bore serial numbers that matched arms stolen from the British Army along with cards from the Patriots. In January 1998, the sergeant-at-arms of the Patriots, Richard Davey, was killed in a motorcycle accident. Found on his corpse was an address book which revealed that he had "strong links" to Hells Angels chapters in the United Kingdom and Belgium along with the telephone numbers of a number of "known cocaine supplies" in Belgium and the Netherlands. At Davey's funeral, 19 "full patch" Hells Angels were present. The president of the Patriots, Martin Pocock, worked as a mechanic at the Hells Angels-owned Kent Customs Bike Shop. Popcock had served with the Royal Engineers for 15 years and most of his service record was protected, leading a police report to deduce "he was attached to a specialist unit". In June 1998, an internal investigation by the Ministry of Defense revealed that the Patriots served as security at Hells Angels events and socialised often with them. The report concluded: "Hells Angels Kent has services personnel effectively under their control". At least seven currently serving soldiers were members of the Patriots.

On 2 November 1998, the police visited Pocock's house on a minor vehicle offense and found that he had a rocket launcher along with a shotgun hanging on the wall of his living room. Once it was established that Pocock did not have a firearms permit, he was arrested and charges with the possession of illegal weapons. In May 1999 Pocock made a plea bargain with the Crown where he pledged guilty to owning nine rocket launchers, four anti-tank mines, one submachine gun, and one sawed off shotgun. There appeared to be an effort to cover up the allegations around the Patriots as a police reported noted: "The Home Office and Military Intelligence are concerned that allegations that the allegiance with the Hells Angels of the armed services would cause considerable embarrassment, especially with regard to the security of military equipment". An officer with Military Intelligence who did not wished to be named told Sher and Marsden: "They [the Patriots] are leaving themselves wide open to getting firearms for the Hells Angels. They will obviously be monitored for the foreseeable future".

Hells Angels member Dennis Taskin was jailed for six years and nine months after admitting illegally possessing ammunition and five guns as well as cocaine, amphetamines and morphine. Police had found an Uzi, three revolvers and an antique pistol as well as dum-dum bullets and drugs when they raided a flat rented by Taskin in Hove on 26 December 2009.

Stuart Manners, a member of the Hells Angels' Cadishead chapter, was jailed for twelve years after being convicted of selling a Smith & Wesson 9mm handgun and 21 bullets to Liverpool criminal Darren Alcock and his associate Paul Estridge in Stockport in August 2012. Alcock and Estridge were both sentenced to 14 years.

== Wales ==
The first Welsh Hells Angels chapter was formed in October 1999. The Hells Angels' West Wales chapter clubhouse in Haverfordwest was raided by police in September 2007, with the police finding a handgun fitted with a silencer loaded with a full magazine of bullets. Gary Young, a probationary club member, was charged with possessing the weapon; he denied the charge and was found not guilty. He was later granted a conditional discharge for two years after admitting possessing a firearm without a certificate, possessing an offensive weapon and possessing three amounts of cannabis, charges which stemmed from several further police raids on his home during the initial investigation. Young was expelled from the Hells Angels due to the club taking exception to him "naming names" about who was whom within the West Wales chapter.

Neil Lake needed three metal plates inserted in his face after being attacked by a Hells Angel at a petrol station in Cardiff in October 2007. Lake took down the registration of his attacker's Harley-Davidson motorcycle which led police to Sean Timmins, the vice-president of the Wolverhampton chapter. Timmins denied inflicting grievous bodily harm on Lake and claimed that a fellow club member had been riding around with the same number plates as him; he told a judge he knew the identity of the actual attacker but explained that it would be against club rules for him to name him. Timmins was cleared of the charge in September 2008 after providing an alibi who said that he was working in his hometown on the day of the attack. He would later be one of the three Hells Angels jailed for six years after the brawl with the Outlaws at Birmingham Airport.

Hells Angels members Stephen Jones and Raymond Scaddan were cleared of violent behavior, while former member Andrew McCann was also found not guilty of violent disorder but convicted of using threatening, abusive, insulting words or behavior at Newport Crown Court on 1 November 2015. Jones and Scaddan maintained that they went to McCann's home in Newport on 24 January 2015 to collect money for a £2,000 gold necklace that had been given to him and that they had acted in self-defence after an alleged attack by McCann and his son. McCann, who left the club in 2014 after a dispute, claimed the two Hells Angels had come to extort £5,000 from him.
