= Engine (British band) =

British boogie rock band

- Origin: Birkenhead, England
- Genres: Hard rock; Blues rock; Boogie rock
- Years active: 1979–1997
- Labels: Back Street Heroes / Six Fifty; Making Waves; Beak Records
- Past members: Wad (Pete Wade); Yozzer (Roy Hughes); Ape ('Diamond Dave' Cornes)

Engine were a British boogie rock band formed in July 1979 in Birkenhead, near Liverpool, England.

They had a three-piece line-up throughout their career, featuring Pete Wade ('Wad') on vocals and guitar, Roy Hughes ('Yozzer') on bass guitar and backing vocals and Dave Cornes ('Ape') on drums.

== History ==
=== 1980s ===
In the early 1980s, following performances in venues across the UK, Engine gained a reputation as an entertaining live act, particularly among the British biker community. As well as their own headline dates, they supported fellow biker favourites such as the Groundhogs and Dumpy's Rusty Nuts at venues such as London's Marquee Club.

An early festival appearance for the band was at the 'Autumn Rock Fest', held at the New Bingley Hall Showground in Staffordshire on 8 September 1984. Engine shared the bill at this event with Magnum, Wishbone Ash, Man, Dumpy's Rusty Nuts and the DTs.

The Merseyside radio station Radio City voted Engine 'Best Local Band' for two years running in 1986 and 1987.

On 29 May 1987, Engine headlined a charity concert, partly organized by the M53 Motorcycle club, in aid of the Claire House Children's Hospice, alongside other local musicians from the Wirral.

Also in 1987, the UK motorbike magazine Back Street Heroes financed the first Engine album: a vinyl-only live recording called 'Well Oiled' which was issued on the magazine's own label, 'Six Fifty'. The album was given a decent review in Kerrang! magazine issue No. 170.

A 7" single was then released on Beak Records, featuring the two tracks 'Getting Away From It All' and 'Just Feel Like Smiling'.

The band were subsequently featured on a cassette-only release showcasing live acts from the Kent Custom Bike Show of 1988, alongside contributions from the Hamsters, and the Blues Band. This was also compiled and marketed by the magazine Back Street Heroes.

On 5 August 1989, Engine performed at the East Anglia Rock Festival at Mildenhall Speedway, on a bill which also featured Rory Gallagher, Uriah Heep, Dumpy's Rusty Nuts, Stan Webb's Chicken Shack, Tigertailz and the Hamsters. They made a return visit to this festival on 3 August 1991, sharing the bill on the latter occasion with Hawkwind, Mama's Boys, Atom Seed and Marshall Law.

=== 1990s ===
Throughout the late 1980s and early 1990s the band continued to gig throughout the UK, appearing alongside acts as diverse as Walter Trout, Snowy White, You Slosh, Lawnmower Deth, the Macc Lads, UK Subs, Midnight Blue and Bulletboys. They were lauded for their live performances which featured a high level of showmanship. Annual Christmas shows in Wolverhampton on 3 December 1989, then every December between 1991 and 1994 and Boxing Day performances at Stairways in Birkenhead were raucous and well received. A typical Engine gig often began with the band arriving onstage to the theme music from 'Jaws', after which various theatrical antics could ensue, such as: drummer Ape continually contorting his face into a variety of comic expressions; the lead and bass guitarists performing a synchronised shuffle reminiscent of the Shadows; and the drummer playing the 'James Bond Theme' with his drumsticks on the strings of the lead guitar, whilst the guitarist held it above his head. It was also not uncommon for the bassist to wear a pair of carpet slippers throughout the entire show. A commercially available video recording entitled 'Live As Yer Like' (filmed at the Tivoli Theatre in Buckley, Wales on 29 June 1989) captured one such performance.

August 1990 saw Engine play to a crowd of some 22,000 bikers at the Bulldog Bash motorcycle festival, which was headlined by Uriah Heep.

In 1991 the band undertook a series of live dates in the Netherlands, Belgium and France which culminated in an appearance at the Salle Surcouf venue in Brest, Brittany on 19 October 1991.

More festival appearances followed, with notable gigs at the Bulldog Bash on 22 August 1992 alongside Dr. Feelgood, Girlschool and Little Caesar, and at the Rock and Blues Custom Show, Pentrich on 31 July 1993 with Hawkwind and Doctor and the Medics. The band's return performance at the Bulldog Bash event in August 1993 (on a bill also featuring Doc Holliday, Micky Moody & Bernie Marsden and Sven Gali) was given a favourable write-up in Kerrang! magazine issue No. 458.

Despite positive press, both in underground fanzines such as Mosher and with occasional features in mainstream rock magazines such as Kerrang!, Engine were unable to convert their grass-roots following into major success. Their one and only studio album was released on CD in 1993 on the 'Making Waves' label, entitled 'Autowreck', but this failed to have any major commercial impact.

Engine played their final gig at the Limelight Club in Crewe in September 1997 in front of an enthusiastic crowd, many of whom had followed the band since its early days.

=== After the break-up of the band ===
Following the break-up of Engine, guitarist Wad began performing under his real name, Pete Wade, and his first project was a short-lived dalliance with a funk-tinged punk band called Solid. Then, in 2003, he formed a blues-rock trio called Mojo Filter with bass guitarist Pete Somerville and drummer Paul Tsanos, and they went on to release an album of classic rock covers called 'Many Miles Travelled'. In 2007, Pete replaced guitarist John Lewis in the British blues act Connie Lush & Blues Shouter, with whom he toured until 2013. In January 2011, Pete Wade and the Lifeblood Band released an album entitled 'Fired Up' on the Fierce Joy record label. In 2014, he formed a blues band called One Eyed Crow with longtime collaborators Pete Somerville and Paul Tsanos.

Since 1997, drummer Ape has been performing as 'Diamond Dave' in Mexican-flavoured rock 'n' roll band the Jalapeños, alongside Charlie Davidson (lead guitar, ex-Bilko's Privates) and Doctor Martyn (bass guitar). They have released several CDs on the independent label '3D Discs'.

Cornes and Davidson from the Jalapeños have also moonlighted in a Status Quo tribute band called Status Quid (not to be confused with the early 1980s parody act of the same name) with Roy 'Yozzer' Hughes joining them on bass. They appeared at the Derbyshire Rock and Blues Custom Show in 1996, and video footage exists of them performing the Quo song 'Down Down' at this event.

Roy Hughes has since worked with Liverpool musician Paul Kappa on a part-time basis, and in 2010 he formed a power trio called 'The Crunched', alongside ex-Cathedral drummer Brian Dixon, with Alan Kulke (formerly of Liverpool bands Caprice / Six of the Best) on guitar and vocals. They mainly performed covers of '70s rock classics. In January 2013, with the addition of vocalist Ash Brookes (of Kiss tribute band, Dressed to Kill) the band was renamed 'Rock Steady'. In 2012 he joined The Swillers based in wrexham, wales Leaving the band in 2023. Currently plays with The Spacies liverpool based covers band with Ian Jump, Paul Ryan (Muffin men) and Terry Steers (Rage)

Cornes has said of his former band: "We are all still mates and go on holiday, on the ale etc., and occasionally play/jam together in various capacities, but not as Engine."

In November 2009, when asked about the future possibility of an Engine reunion, Cornes had this to say: "Between the three of us there is a real feeling that it's done and dusted and we have nothing left to prove... Who knows what the future holds, though? What's that saying? Never say never again."

== Members ==
- Pete "Wad" Wade – guitar, lead vocals
- Roy "Yozzer" Hughes – bass, backing vocals
- Dave "Ape" Cornes – drums

== Discography ==
=== Albums ===
- Well Oiled, released in 1987, is a vinyl-only album. All tracks were recorded live, in one take, in front of an invited studio audience at Yellow Two Studios in Stockport, England, in July 1987.
- Rough 'N' Ready, released in 1992, is a cassette-only album of live and studio recordings.
- Autowreck, released in 1993, is a studio album.

=== Compilation albums ===
- Live at Kent Custom Bike Show, recorded in 1988, is a cassette-only compilation album of live performances from the 10th Kent Custom Bike Show, which was held at Snargate, near New Romney in Kent, England, on 9 July 1988. In addition to Engine, other bands featured on the album include: the Hamsters, the Brothers Grimm and the Blues Band. All tracks were recorded live with the Rolling Stones Mobile Studio and engineered by Mick McKenna. Mixing (by Tim Matyear) took place at Woodworm Recording Studios at Barford St. Michael in Oxfordshire. The album was funded and distributed by Back Street Heroes motorcycle magazine.

=== Singles ===
- Getting Away From It All / Just Feel Like Smiling (Beak Records – 1987, 7-inch vinyl)

=== Videography ===
- Live As Yer Like, released in 1989, is a video recording of a live performance. The footage was recorded at the Tivoli Theatre in Buckley, Wales, on 29 June 1989.
- Live at the New Inn, Crawley is a 1993 unofficial audience recording.
