= Christopher Dale =

Christopher Dale may refer to:

- Dominic Dale (born Christopher Dale in 1971), Welsh snooker player and commentator
- Chris Dale (footballer) (born 1950), English footballer
- Chris Dale (cricketer) (born 1961), English cricketer
- Chris Dale, bass guitarist formerly in bands including Atom Seed and Tank
