= Simon Baker (disambiguation) =

Simon Baker (born 1969) is an Australian actor.

Simon Baker may also refer to:

- Simon Baker, Scottish artist, maker of the Saltire Society Literary Awards
- Simon Baker (Canadian actor) (born 1986), Aboriginal Canadian actor
- Simon Baker (pilot), British aviator
- Simon Baker (priest) (born 1957), Archdeacon of Lichfield
- Simon Baker (racewalker) (born 1958), Australian race walker
- Simon Strousse Baker (1866–1932), American president of Washington & Jefferson College
