= Stormin' the Castle =

Stormin' the Castle is a bikers rally held in the north east of England at Witton Castle.

Stormin' celebrated its 25th year in 2015, whilst run independently and voluntarily, is one of the main fund raising events for the Motorcycle Action Group and over the last 24 years has been a major donator to support the ongoing fight for rider’s rights.

Along with Nabbed, Bulldog Bash, and The Farmyard, Stormin' is one of the biggest biker rallies in the UK. The rally has played host to many popular bands including Levellers, UFO, Hayseed Dixie, Stranglers and Terrorvision. Usually there are some cover bands as well.

Entertainment is spread across 2 stages, Main stage, and the smaller Iris tent. The Iris tent has a more laid back atmosphere with a mixture of Blues, R&B, Folk and Prog. The festival also offers a fairground, traders and caterers stalls across the site.

There are significant limitations on disabled access: limited permits are available for disabled (blue badge) parking and the website advises of this.

== Event information ==
General adult weekend entry is usually priced at around £45 and includes camping as well. The rally usually opens at 9 am every year on the Friday. It is customary that on Fridays, visitors are only able to access the camping fields until midday when the showfield opens.

== Usual event opening hours ==
Friday: Open 12:00

Saturday: Open 10:00

Sunday: Open 09:00

== Motorcycle Trophy categories ==
- Best in Show
- Best Custom
- Best Engineering
- Best Streetfighter
- Best Paintwork Best Classic (pre ’85)
- Exhibitor’s Choice
- Best Three Wheeler
- Best Alternative
- Best British
- Best Japanese
