= Stratford on Avon Railway =

The Stratford on Avon Railway (Note: The railway industry locally used the name Stratford on Avon, with or without hyphens, until 1951 from when Stratford upon Avon was used.) was a branch railway line opened in 1860, to connect the town of Stratford-upon-Avon to the Great Western Railway main line at Hatton, in England. It was worked by the GWR. In 1861 it was connected through Stratford to a branch line from Honeybourne, and this later enabled the development of a through mineral traffic. The company was absorbed by the GWR in 1883.

In 1906 a trunk route was opened from Honeybourne to Cheltenham, so that the GWR now had an independent route from Birmingham to Bristol, partly over the Stratford Railway, which was modernised for the purpose. In 1907-1908 the GWR's position was further enhanced when North Warwickshire Line opened, making a shorter route from Birmingham and joining the original line at Bearley.

The heavy mineral traffic, and later the through passenger traffic, was diverted away from the line, and it was curtailed at Stratford. It remains in passenger use as the Stratford upon Avon branch of the Chiltern Main Line, and the Stratford end of the North Warwickshire Line.

== Origins ==
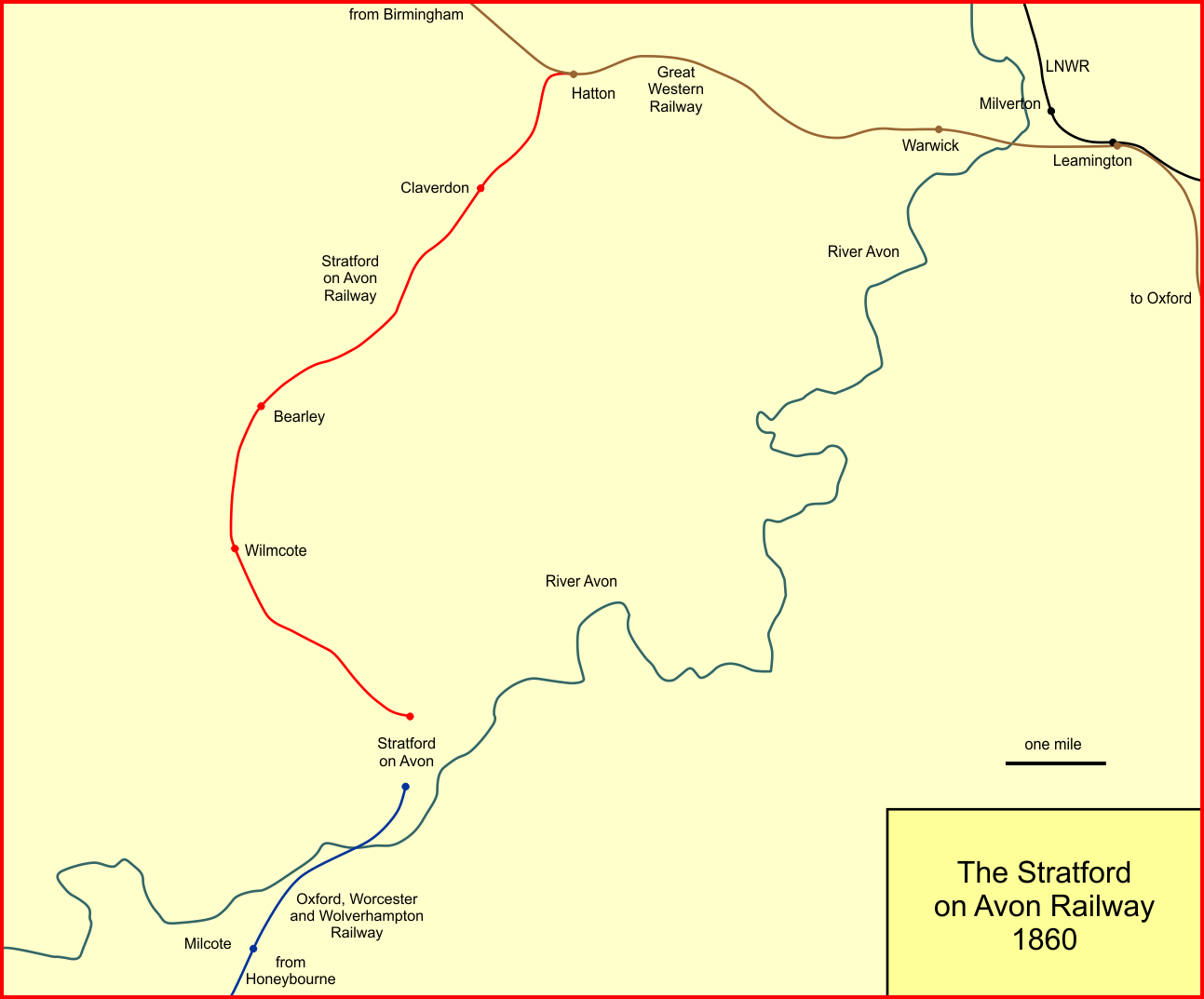
The Stratford on Avon Railway in 1860

In a period of considerable railway construction following restoration of confidence in railway projects, two main lines were built, each passing about ten miles from Stratford on Avon.

The Great Western Railway built a trunk line, originally titled the Birmingham and Oxford Junction Railway, which formed the GWR's Birmingham main line. It opened on 1 October 1852, as a mixed gauge double track. It passed through Leamington, to the north-east of Stratford-on-Avon.

== OW&WR branch from Honeybourne ==
The Oxford, Worcester and Wolverhampton Railway (OW&WR) opened its main line throughout in 1854; it passed through Honeybourne, somewhat to the east of Evesham. The OW&WR had decided to construct a branch line to Stratford from Honeybourne, and it opened the line to the public on 12 July 1859. It was a narrow (standard) gauge line. The Stratford station was on the south side of the town, at Sancta Lane.

== Stratford-on-Avon railway ==
Stratford-upon-Avon Railway Act 1857
- Act of Parliament
- Parliament of the United Kingdom
- Long title: An Act for the making and maintaining of the Stratford-upon-Avon Railway; and for other Purposes.
- Citation: 20 & 21 Vict. c. cxvi

Dates
- Royal assent: 10 August 1857

Text of statute as originally enacted

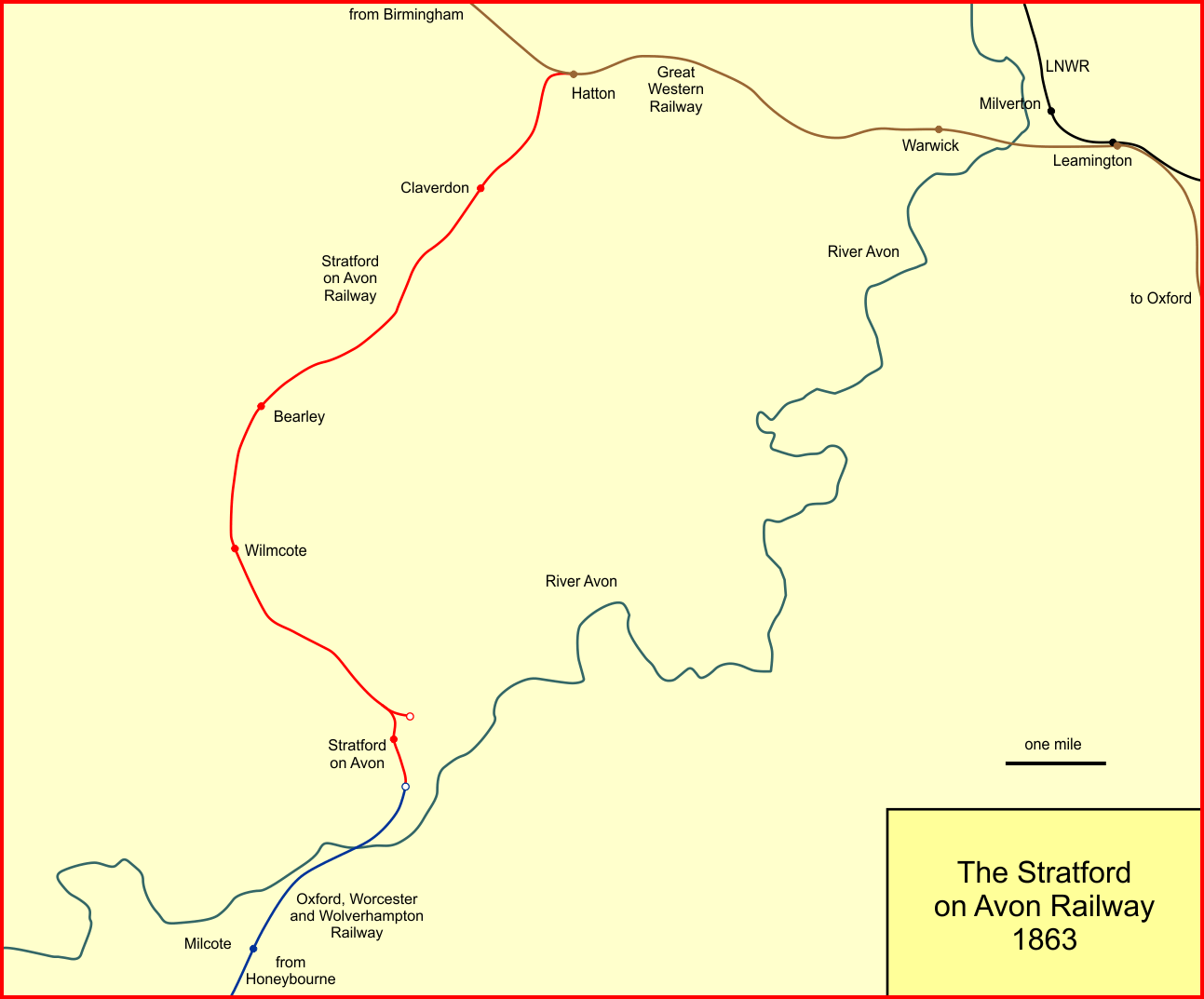
The Stratford on Avon Railway in 1863

Stratford-upon-Avon Railway Act 1861
- Act of Parliament
- Parliament of the United Kingdom
- Long title: An Act for authorizing the Stratford-upon-Avon Railway Company to raise additional Capital; and for other Purposes.
- Citation: 24 & 25 Vict. c. xxxi

Dates
- Royal assent: 17 May 1861

While the OW&WR branch line was under construction, interested parties promoted the Stratford-upon-Avon Railway. This was to run to Stratford from the GWR (Birmingham and Oxford) line at Hatton, to the west of Leamington. It was authorised as a mixed gauge railway by an act of Parliament, the Stratford-upon-Avon Railway Act 1857 (20 & 21 Vict. c. cxvi) of 10 August 1857, with authorised capital of £65,000. (Note: Carter says "together with a 3/8 mile branch.") It opened on 10 October 1860, following a ceremonial opening the previous day. It was worked by the Great Western Railway from the outset. Intermediate stations were provided at Wilmcote, Bearley and Claverdon. The Stratford-on-Avon terminus was a timber-built train shed at Birmingham Road, north of the town.

The Works by this Act authorized comprise the following; (to wit,)

- First, a Railway commencing in or near to a Field or Close of Pasture Land in the Parish of Old Stratford in the County of Warwick, in the Occupation of Mary Waitt, adjoining the Turnpike Road leading from Stratford-upon-Avon to Birmingham, and adjoining the Works or Buildings of the Stratford-upon-Avon Gaslight and Coke Company, and terminating in the Parish of Hatton in the County of Warwick, by a Junction with the Birmingham and Orford Junction Railway (belonging to the Great Western Railway Company) at a Point thereon at or near to the North End of the Down Platform at the Hatton Station on that Railway:
- Secondly, a Branch Railway diverging from and out of the intended Railway at or near a Field called Burnt Close in the Parish of Hatton in the County of Warwick, in the Occupation of Charles Worsey, and termimating by a Junction with the Birmingham and Oxford Junction Railway at or near to a Point thereon Thirty-six Chains or thereabouts North of the Point where the intended Railway is proposed to terminate.
— Section 23, Stratford-upon-Avon Railway Act 1857 (20 & 21 Vict. c. cxvi)

== Connecting the branches ==
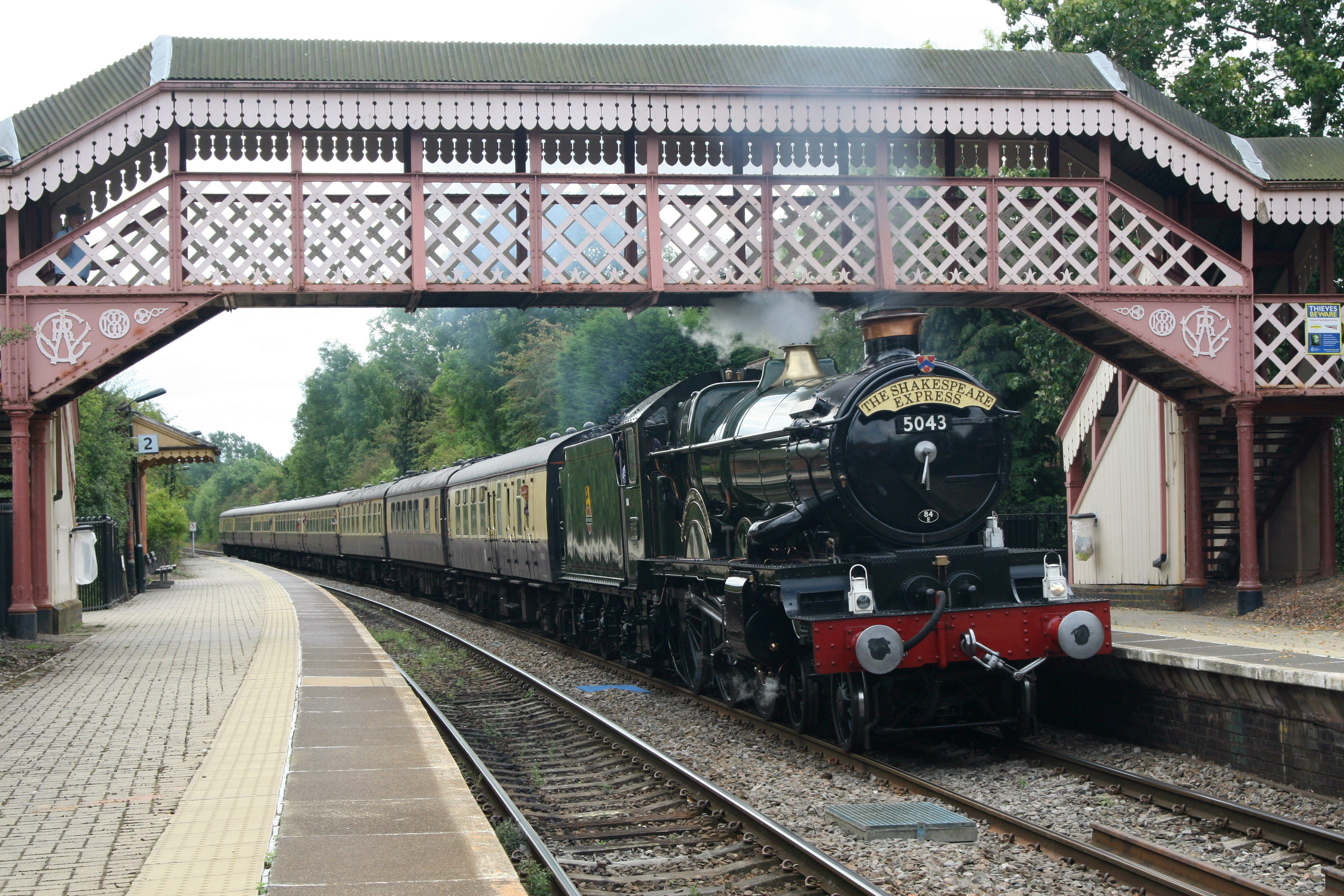
Wilmcote station in 2011

There were now two Stratford branches approaching the town from opposite directions, and there was a gap between them. On 24 July 1861 the line was extended from the Oxford, Worcester and Wolverhampton Railway's (OW&WR's) temporary terminus to a junction with the Stratford on Avon railway. The link was made by the Stratford-on-Avon Railway. At first the connecting line used the OW&WR station, which was temporary, and by-passed the original Stratford-on-Avon Railway terminal at Birmingham Road; trains may have reversed into it from the connecting line. Through trains started running between Leamington, Worcester and Malvern from 1 August 1861.

== New Stratford station ==
A new Stratford-on-Avon joint station was opened on 1 January 1863, used by the Great Western Railway (GWR) and the Oxford, Worcester and Wolverhampton Railway. The original Stratford on Avon Railway (SoAR) terminal became a goods depot from the same day. The new station was Italianate in design with a hipped, overhanging roof in Brunel's early style. Also on the same day broad gauge operation on the GWR lines was discontinued, although the broad gauge rails remained in situ on the branch for six years.

== Company amalgamations ==
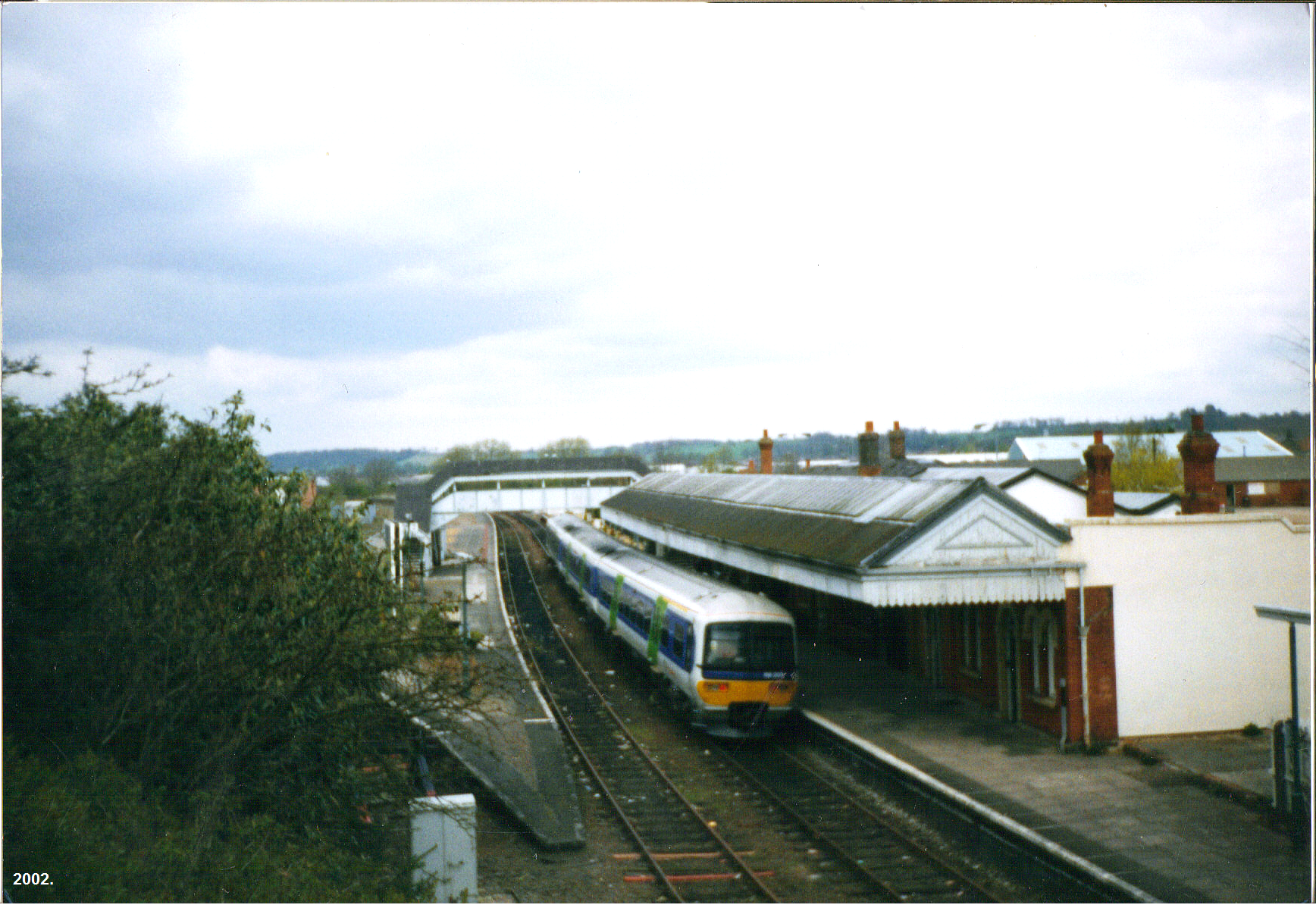
Stratford upon Avon station in 2002

The Oxford, Worcester and Wolverhampton Railway (OW&WR) and the Great Western Railway (GWR) had not always had good relations; the OW&WR joined with other railways to form the West Midland Railway (WMR) in 1860. The WMR became friendly with the GWR, and in fact was leased by the GWR from 1 July 1861; the two companies merged on 1 August 1863, taking the title Great Western Railway for the combined company.

The Stratford-upon-Avon Railway Company was amalgamated with the Great Western Railway by the Great Western Railway Act 1883 (46 & 47 Vict. c. cxciii) of 1 July 1883.

== Alcester Railway ==
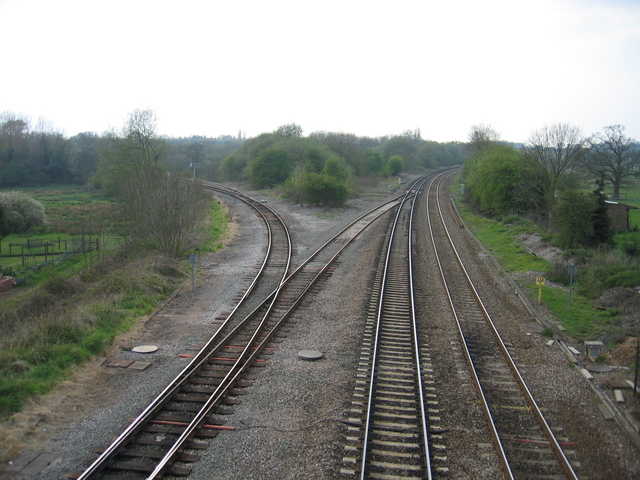
Hatton Junction; the main line to Birmingham is to the top right; the Stratford line is to the left

The Alcester Railway was authorised by the Alcester Railway Act 1872 (35 & 36 Vict. c. clxx) on 6 August 1872 to build a line from the Stratford on Avon Railway at Bearley, to Alcester. It opened on 4 September 1876. At this time both the Stratford-on-Avon Railway and the Alcester Railway were dependencies of the Great Western Railway, and they were both worked by that company. The Alcester trains shuttled from Bearley to Alcester, though some ran through over the Stratford Railway to Leamington.

On 22 July 1878 the Alcester Railway was acquired by the GWR and the SoAR jointly by the Great Western Railway Act 1878 (41 & 42 Vict. c. ccviii); the SoAR was itself absorbed by the GWR on 1 July 1883, by the Great Western Railway Act 1883 (46 & 47 Vict. c. cxciii) of 20 August 1883.

== Stratford-upon-Avon and Midland Junction Railway ==
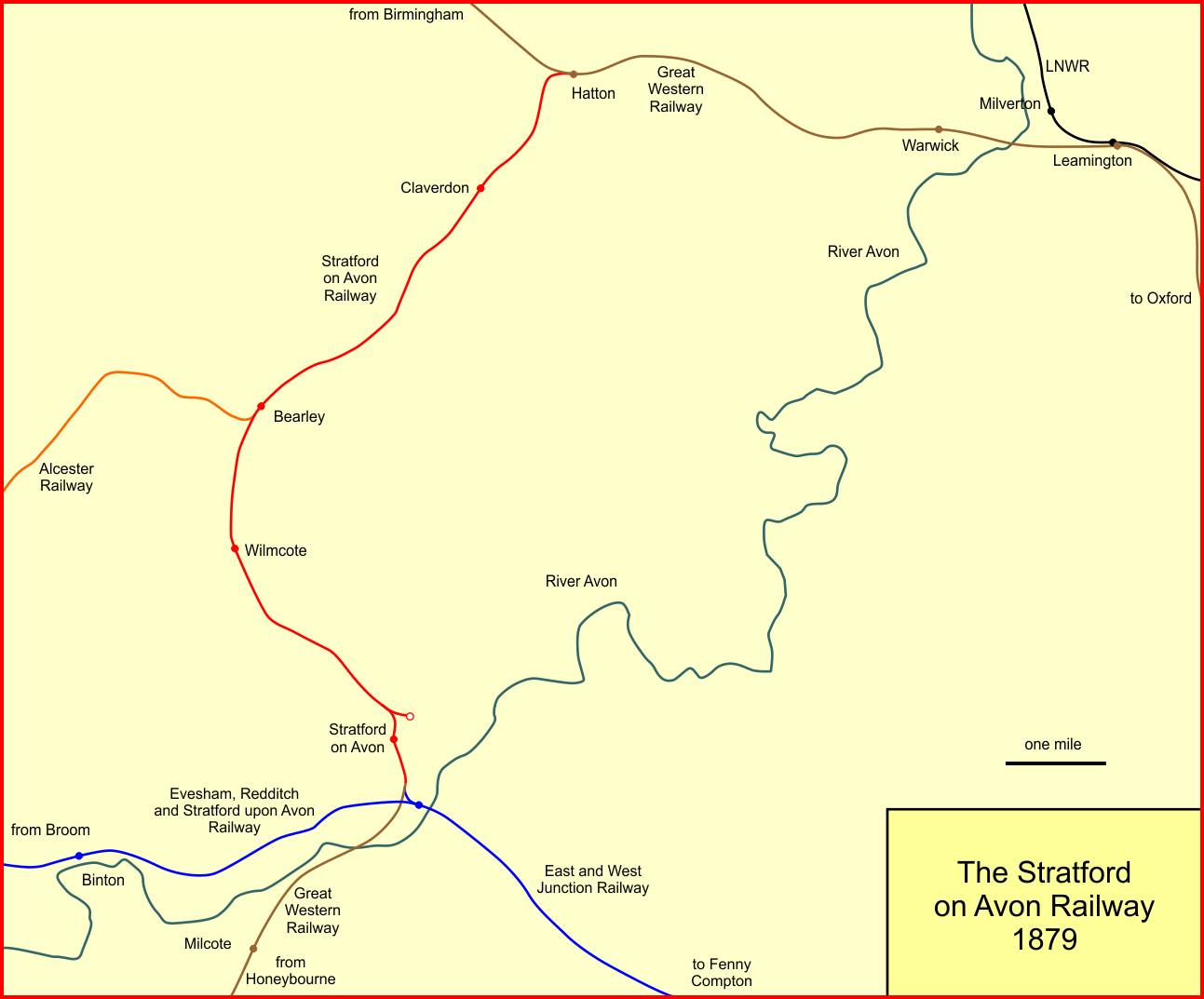
The Stratford on Avon Railway in 1879

The East and West Junction Railway was conceived to convey Northamptonshire iron ore to South Wales, but it never fully achieved that aim. It opened from Fenny Compton through to the GWR at Stratford-on-Avon on 1 July 1873. The company was desperately short of money during construction and after opening. It opened its own Stratford station in June 1875, but passenger traffic was suspended from 31 July 1877 until 22 March 1885.

The Evesham, Redditch and Stratford-upon-Avon Junction Railway obtained an act of Parliament, the Evesham, Redditch and Stratford-upon-Avon Junction Railway Act 1873 (36 & 37 Vict. c. ccxlv), to build a line from Stratford-upon-Avon to Broom Junction on 5 August 1873. It opened its line on 2 June 1879 and was worked by the E&WJR.

In 1908 the Stratford-upon-Avon and Midland Junction Railway was formed from amalgamation of the East and West Junction Railway, the Evesham, Redditch and Stratford-upon-Avon Junction Railway and the Stratford-upon-Avon, Towcester and Midland Junction Railway. The Broom Junction to Stratford-upon-Avon passenger service was withdrawn on 16 June 1947, followed by the passenger service east of Stratford on 7 April 1952.

On 7 March 1960 the connection at Fenny Compton was remodelled to provide a facing connection in order to form a route for the running of 800-ton iron ore trains from Banbury to South Wales. A new east-to-south curve was installed at Stratford-upon-Avon for the service. This curve opened on 24 April 1960 and the mineral flow operated from on 12 June 1960. The line from Stratford to Broom Junction was closed the following day. This traffic continued to use the line until the sudden closure of the Stratford to Cheltenham line in late 1976 when a Toton to Severn Tunnel freight train derailed near Winchcombe.

== Hatton North Curve ==
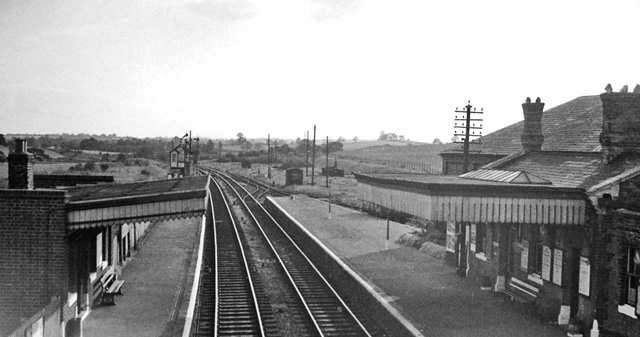
Bearley station looking west; the Alcester line curves away to the right beyond the signal gantry

A North Curve was installed at Hatton, forming a triangular junction and giving a direct run towards Birmingham came into use on 1 July 1897. The GWR accelerated its services between Birmingham and Stratford using the curve, and bringing the fastest time to about forty minutes.

== Cheltenham and Honeybourne line ==
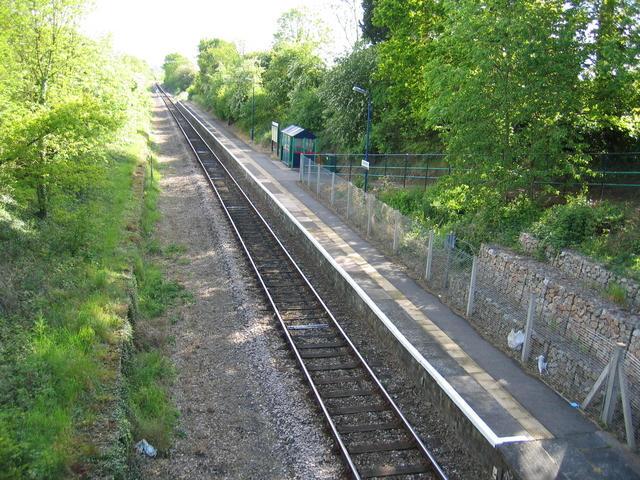
Claverdon railway station in 2005

On 1 August 1899, the Great Western Railway (GWR) obtained the Great Western Railway Act 1899 (62 & 63 Vict. c. clxxxvii) authorising a high speed line from Honeybourne to Cheltenham; the maximum gradient was to be 1 in 108 and the tightest curve radius was to be half a mile. The powers included doubling the Stratford Railway between Stratford and Bearley, and forming a new curve there to connect with the North Warwickshire Line.

The new line opened progressively, between 1904 and 1 August 1906. This gave the GWR a route between Birmingham and Bristol via Stratford and Cheltenham independent of the Midland Railway. Stratford station was enlarged, a footbridge provided, and awnings were added over the platforms in 1899.

With the creation of the new route from Birmingham to Cheltenham early in the twentieth century, double track from Bearley to Stratford was brought into use on 9 December 1907. Through long-distance express passenger trains started running on the route on 1 July 1908.

== North Warwickshire Railway ==
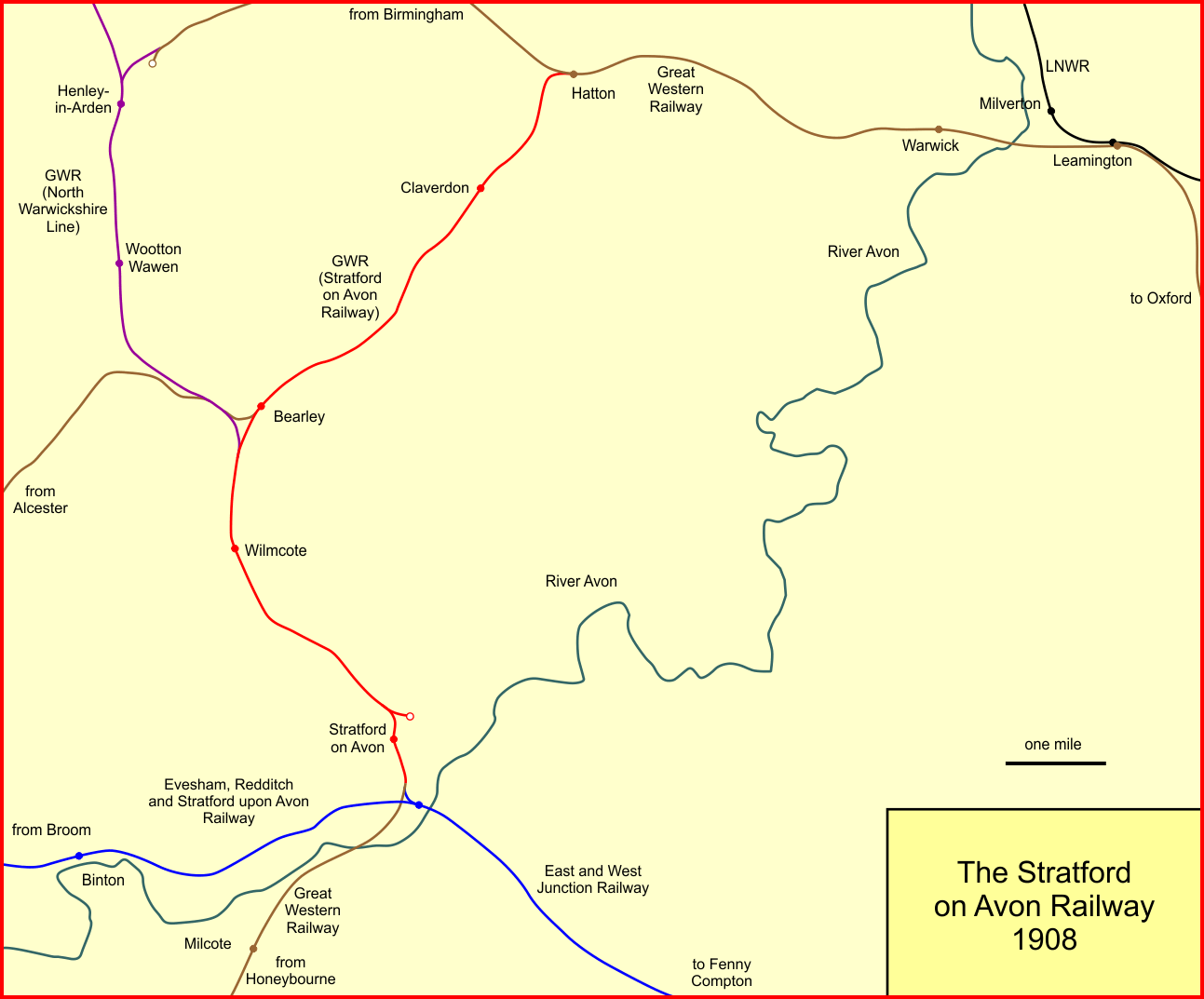
Stratford railways in 1908

In the 1880s and later there was growing dissatisfaction with the service provided by the Great Western Railway in its area of influence. A direct line to Stratford, the Birmingham, North Warwickshire and Stratford on Avon Railway, was authorised by the Birmingham, North Warwickshire, and Stratford-upon-Avon Railway Act 1894 (57 & 58 Vict. c. ccxi) on 25 August 1894, but the finance was not available to proceed. By a later act of Parliament, the Great Western Railway Act 1900 (63 & 64 Vict. c. clx) of 30 July 1900, the authorisation was transferred to the Great Western Railway. The line was to link to the GWR at Bearley North Junction on the Stratford Railway. The line was opened on 9 December 1907 for goods, and on 1 July 1908 for passengers. The new Bearley North Curve was opened on the same day.

== Train service ==
The local passenger train service has been fairly constant over the years:

- 1887: 8 Down, 9 Up, Sundays 2, journey time 25 minutes;
- 1910: 10 each way, Sundays 2, journey time 20 minutes;
- 1922: 10 each way, Sundays 3, journey time 20 minutes;
- 1938: 13 each way, Sundays 6, journey time 19 minutes;
- 1993: 9 Up, 8 Down, Sundays 5, journey time 12 minutes.

Semmens describes the long-distance services on the Birmingham – Stratford – Honeybourne route:

In 1922 there were five through southbound trains a day, with a fifth between Birmingham and Swansea. They all called at Stratford for two to five minutes on their way to the stop at... Cheltenham at the south end of the Great Western’s 1906 line... By 1939 the number of Birmingham-Bristol trains on ordinary week-days had fallen to four, [and] one to Swansea... However, as with other West of England services, there had been an explosion of Saturdays-only trains, in this case amounting to another six southbound ones.

In 1934 streamlined diesel railcars started operating between Birmingham and Cardiff on the route. Three twin-engined cars equipped with buffets provided fast business services on the route.

== Track improvements ==
On 2 July 1939 double track was commissioned between Bearley and Hatton. As part of the work, the original Claverdon passenger station was closed and replaced by a new one west of the overbridge.

== William Shakespeare Express ==
In 1951 an express service from London was run; it was titled the "William Shakespeare Express", and it used some of the first British Railways Standard coaches. The main part of the train ran from Paddington to Wolverhampton, but three coaches were uncoupled at Leamington and taken on to Stratford, often by 2-6-2T No. 4112. The venture was a commercial failure and the title vanished at the end of that summer service.

== Renaming ==
Stratford-on-Avon station was renamed Stratford-upon-Avon on 18 June 1951.

== Closure of the Stratford-upon-Avon to Cheltenham Route ==
The route via Stratford-upon-Avon continued to be heavily used for long-distance passenger services, but the drive for rationalisation of duplicate passenger lines eventually resulted in the permanent diversion of Birmingham to Bristol services to the Ashchurch (former Midland Railway) route. From 10 September 1962 the Cornishman (train)" and the South Wales diesel multiple unit trains to/from Cardiff via Gloucester and Chepstow were diverted via the former Midland Railway route via Ashchurch, but summer-only trains continued to use the Honeybourne route on Friday nights and Saturdays until 1966. Many Saturday-only and diversion trains between Birmingham and Bristol and onward to Devon and Cornwall also used the route. Typical locomotives were Class 45s, Class 47s and Class 52 Western diesel Hydraulics on both passenger and freight traffic.

The through Stratford-upon-Avon route suffered a severe blow in late 1976 when a Toton to Severn Tunnel Junction freight train derailed near Winchcombe, causing a significant length of extensive track and sleeper damage. As a result of the financial cost of repairs, British Rail determined it was more cost-effective to divert the remaining traffic to other lines and completely close the Cheltenham to Stratford-upon-Avon line as a through route shortly thereafter. The line closed completely on 25 August 1976, with track lifting carried out during 1979. A minimal single-track freight-only section from Honeybourne to Long Marston was retained for access to the former Ministry of Defence (MoD) depot. This remains open today.

The line south of Honeybourne, between Broadway and Cheltenham was reopened in stages between 1984 and 2003 as the Gloucestershire Warwickshire Railway.

== Diversion from Stratford-upon-Avon and Midland Junction Railway ==
On 7 March 1960 the connection at Fenny Compton was remodelled to provide a facing connection in order to form a route for the running of 800-ton iron ore trains from Banbury to South Wales. A new east-to-south curve was installed at Stratford-upon-Avon for the service. This curve opened on 24 April 1960 and the mineral flow operated from on 12 June 1960. The line from Stratford to Broom Junction was closed the following day.

== Closure of Stratford goods station ==
The original terminal station of the Stratford-on-Avon Railway had been reduced to a goods station when the through line was opened; it continued in use until 6 May 1968 when it closed.

== Rationalisation ==
The Hatton North Curve was singled on 22 September 1968.

The double track between Bearley and Hatton was reduced to single on 12 January 1969, only one platform at Bearley remaining in use.

The through line from Stratford to Honeybourne closed in 1976, and Stratford station became a terminus.

== Stratford Parkway station ==
A new station called Stratford-upon-Avon Parkway opened on 19 May 2013, on the north-west margin of the town near the A46 road.

== Station list ==
- Hatton junctions;
- Claverdon; opened 10 October 1860; still open;
- Bearley; opened 10 October 1860; still open;
- Wilmcote; opened 10 October 1860; still open;
- Stratford-upon-Avon Parkway; opened 19 May 2013; still open;
- Stratford on Avon (first station); opened 10 October 1860; closed 1 January 1863;
- Stratford on Avon; station on through line; opened 1 January 1863; renamed Stratford-upon-Avon 18 June 1951; still open (as a terminus).
