= Chris Dale (cricketer) =

English cricketer

Personal information
- Full name: Christopher Stephen Dale
- Born: 15 September 1961 (age 65); Canterbury, Kent
- Batting: Right-handed
- Bowling: Right-arm off break

Domestic team information
- Years: Team
- 1984: Gloucestershire
- 1986: Kent

Career statistics
| Competition | First-class | List A |
|---|---|---|
| Matches | 11 | 4 |
| Runs scored | 118 | 0 |
| Batting average | 14.75 | 0.00 |
| 100s/50s | 0/0 | 0/0 |
| Top score | 49 | 0 |
| Balls bowled | 955 | 138 |
| Wickets | 7 | 2 |
| Bowling average | 87.00 | 69.50 |
| 5 wickets in innings | 0 | 0 |
| 10 wickets in match | 0 | 0 |
| Best bowling | 3/10 | 1/35 |
| Catches/stumpings | 1/– | 0/– |
- Source: CricInfo, 20 April 2014

Christopher Stephen Dale (born 15 December 1961) is an English former professional cricketer. Born at Canterbury in Kent, Dale was a spin bowler who played for Gloucestershire County Cricket Club and Kent County Cricket Club during the 1980s.

== Cricketing career ==
Dale was vitally contracted by Kent County Cricket Club. He made his debut for the county's Second XI in 1979 and played for both Kent and Essex Second XI's until August 1983 when he joined Gloucestershire. He made his first-class cricket debut for Gloucestershire in May 1984 against Hampshire at County Ground, Southampton. Dale played eight times for Gloucestershire in the 1984 County Championship and three times in the 1984 John Player Special League.

During the 1985 season Dale played twice for Derbyshire County Cricket Club's Second XI before rejoining Kent at the beginning of the 1986 season. He made his Kent debut against the touring Indians in May 1986 before making two appearances for the county in the 1986 County Championship and one in the 1986 John Player Special League.

In local domestic cricket, Dale played for and sometimes captained St Lawrence and Highland for 25 years. He also played in Australia and qualified as an umpire. In 2015 he gave up his job in order to establish a cricket coaching business based in Canterbury.

== External list ==
- Chris Dale at Cricinfo
