= Long Marston =

Long Marston may refer to:

- Long Marston, Hertfordshire
- Long Marston, North Yorkshire
- Long Marston, Warwickshire (formerly in Gloucestershire)
  - Long Marston Airfield
  - RAF Long Marston
