= RAF Long Marston =

Former RAF station in Warwickshire, England

RAF Long Marston
- Long Marston, Warwickshire in England
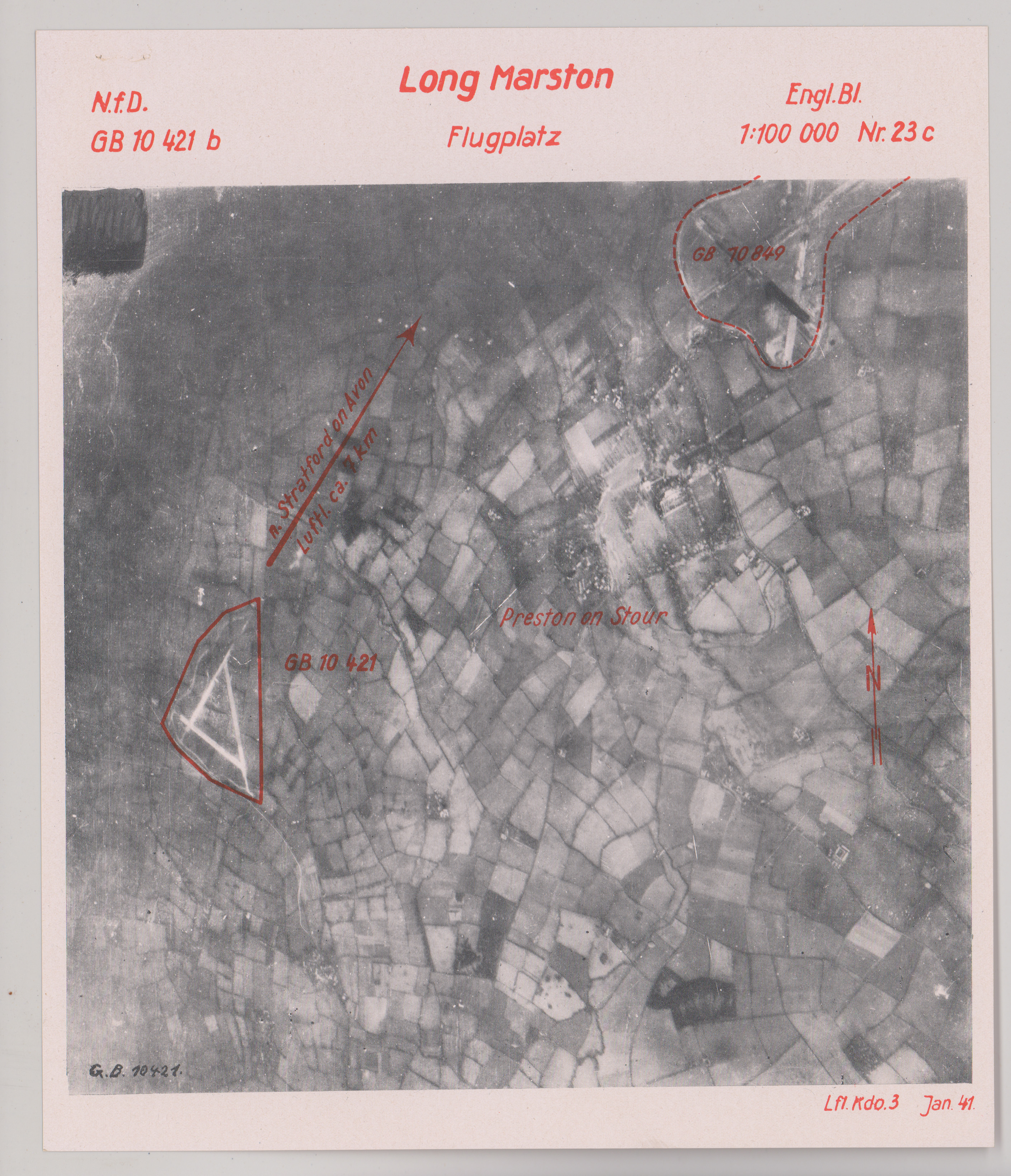
- RAF Long Marston on a target dossier of the German Luftwaffe, 1941

Site information
- Type: Royal Air Force satellite station
- Code: JS
- Owner: Air Ministry
- Operator: Royal Air Force
- Controlled by: RAF Bomber Command * No. 6 (T) Group RAF * No. 91 (OTU) Group RAF

Location
- Shown within Warwickshire RAF Long Marston (the United Kingdom)
- Coordinates: 52°08′15″N 001°45′09″W

Site history
- Built: 1940
- Built by: John Laing & Son Ltd
- In use: November 1941 - 1954
- Battles/wars: European theatre of World War II

Airfield information
- Elevation: 47 metres (154 ft) AMSL
Runways
Direction	Length and surface
04/22	Tarmac
11/29	Tarmac
16/34	Tarmac

Royal Air Force Long Marston or more simply RAF Long Marston is a former Royal Air Force satellite station, that was opened in 1941 in the county of Warwickshire.

== History ==
The airfield was constructed in 1940 upon privately owned arable farmland requisitioned in 1939 for war use by the Air Ministry, the builder John Laing & Son Ltd being contracted by the British Government for the task.

Its war-time facilities consisted of three tarmac runways in a standard RAF 'A' configuration, with the primary one running for 1,500 yards (1,400 m) (the main runway would subsequently be extended to 2,400 yards (2,200 m)), and the other two 1,100 yards (1,000 m) each; an air-traffic control tower, two T2 hangars and one B1 hangar. It possessed also a mix of 27 pan and spectacle dispersals, which were used to spread the aircraft around the site to make targeting of them more difficult in the event of an attack by the Luftwaffe, and air-raid shelters. The airfield was equipped with ground assault defensive concrete pill-boxes, two of them of the distinctive "F.C. Construction" (or "Mushroom") type. The facility also comprised billets to house up to 1,000 air personnel.

The first RAF unit based at the Long Marston was Bomber Command's No. 24 Operational Training Unit (OTU), flying Armstrong Whitworth Whitleys, Avro Ansons and Vickers Wellingtons, which began operating at the field on 15 March 1943, using it as a satellite airfield to RAF Honeybourne. The Whitleys joined the unit after retiring from front-line service as an early Second World War night bomber when new four engined bombers like the Avro Lancaster took over the offensive. Another unit based at the airfield was No. 1681 Bomber (Defence) Flight RAF flying Hawker Hurricanes and Curtiss Tomahawks, whose duties involved providing simulated attacks against OTU aircraft to train the OTU crews in how to defend their aircraft in combat conditions. Their main base was RAF Pershore, with Long Marston used as a satellite station between 1 July 1943 and 21 August 1944. No. 24 Operational Training Unit ceased operations and withdrew from using Long Marston on 24 July 1945 two months after the fall of Nazi Germany.

Post-war the airfield's active use by the RAF came to an end, and its facilities were closed in the late 1940s and placed under the authority of No. 8 Maintenance Unit RAF, No. 3 Maintenance Group operating from RAF Little Rissington until 1954.

No. 10 (Advanced) Flying Training School RAF used the airfield as a relief landing ground between 15 January 1952 and 1 October 1953 with Airspeed Oxfords, until replaced by No. 9 Flying Training School RAF who used the site between 1 October 1953 and 31 March 1954.

=== Accidents and incidents ===
RAF Long Marston experienced several accidents within its service life, such as:-

Date	Incident	Reference
5 February 1944	Armstrong Whitworth Whitley LA929 of No. 24 Operational Training Unit (OTU) ran into a hedge after landing.	
4 April 1944	Tomahawk AH885 of No. 1681 Flight RAF ran off the runway when landing and tipped onto its nose.	
23 September 1944	Armstrong Whitworth Albemarle P1435 No. 296 Squadron RAF overshot landing, while towing Airspeed Horsa HG936.	
16 December 1944	Avro Lancaster NG435 newly built by Armstrong Whitworth, crashed during a test flight.	

=== Long Marston Airfield ===
In 1954 RAF Long Marston was decommissioned from public use by the Air Ministry, and the site was returned to the possession of the private landowners of the property in 1939. It was renamed 'Long Marston Airfield', and its facilities were made use of for the next six decades as a site for motor-sports events, and a variety of other commercial enterprises with the ICAO code of "EGBL" which has since been re-allocated to Alscot Airfield.

The airfield was managed by Anthony Hodges, and was home to:

- Microflights Flying School
- Avon Microlight Club
- Freedom Sports Aviation - club and flying school; Chief Flying Instructor Simon Baker)
- MotorGlide - gliding club specialising in motorgliders
- the Shakespeare County Raceway dragstrip
- the Long Marston Clay Shooting Ground.

It was also well known as a venue for summertime music festivals, including Godskitchen, Global Gathering, the Bulldog Bash, and the Phoenix Festival.

In 1981 the TV series Crossroads filmed there, ATV relocated the set of the Crossroads reception area to the Airfield to set light to it as part of the motel fire storyline.

In 1983 the Evesham Motorcycle Club hosted held the British Masters Grasstrack Championships at the Airfield.

== Current use ==
The site has since been acquired by a developer and has been renamed Fernleigh Park. It is now a housing estate featuring 2, 3, 4 & 5 bedroom homes being built by CALA and Bovis Homes. The first phase of development will see over 400 homes built on the former Long Marston Airfield.

On 26 November 2015, a Stratford District Council planning committee approved plans by CALA Homes to build 400 houses on the site, part of their proposed development scheme which aims to eventually feature 3,500 houses.

== See also ==
- List of former Royal Air Force stations
