= Alan Fisher (biker) =

British businessman

Alan Fisher (born 1959), better known as "Snob" Fisher, is a British businessman, outlaw biker and former member of the Hells Angels motorcycle club.

== Hells Angels ==
Fisher was born into a wealthy family in the Kensington neighbourhood of London. In 1972, at the age of 13, he read a newspaper article about the exploits of Sonny Barger in the United States, which inspired his interest in the outlaw biker subculture. Fisher has dyslexia, and was bullied as being "stupid" as a child. Fisher started riding motorcycles at the age of 11. Fisher stated that he felt drawn to the outlaw biker subculture because he felt like an outsider. His nickname of "Snob" was given to him by his working class friends on account of his upper class accent. In 1980, he was convicted of affray (fighting in public) and in 1983 he was convicted of two counts of possession of amphetamine. In 1984, he joined the Hells Angels. As well as being the president of the Hells Angels London chapter, Fisher runs a motorcycle store in West London, Snob's Ultimate Customs, where the average price of the motorcycles on sale is £36,000.

=== Chapter president ===
Well spoken, Fisher has become the public face of the Hells Angels in the United Kingdom. The London chapter, of which Fisher was the president, was the most wealthy and oldest Hells Angels chapter in Great Britain. He insists that the group is a motorcycle club that just happens to have some criminal members, not a criminal organisation which poses as a motorcycle club as the Crown claims. Fisher told a journalist from the BBC in 2002: "Going out on a motorcycle allows me to be free, to express myself, and to ride pretty much within the legal system". The Canadian journalists Julian Sher and William Marsden have argued against this thesis, noting that Fisher himself has a criminal record along with most of the members of Angels' London chapter. Sher and Marsden noted that other members of the London chapter with criminal records include Guy "Tricky Tramp" Lawrence who has a lengthy criminal record for various offenses such as theft, assault, and drug possession; Andrew Brooks who has a conviction for theft and four convictions for drug possession; Paul Floodgate who served four years in prison for possession of cannabis; David Clark who was convicted of possession of cocaine and amphetamine; and Marin "Rocky" Rock who served 7 years in prison for assault and another 18 months for possession of cocaine and LSD. However, Sher and Marsden concede that Fisher is a successful businessman.

Graham Weeks of the National Criminal Intelligence Service (NCIS) said of the British Hells Angels: "They are up up there with the Triads and the Mafia and the East Europeans. They are up there with the best organised crime people in the world". In 1994, members of the Hells Angels Montreal chapter were involved in a scheme to ship 500 kilograms of cocaine to the London chapter. One of the members of the conspiracy on the Montreal end was an undercover officer of the Royal Canadian Mounted Police (RCMP). On 17 August 1994, a ship left Barranquilla loaded with the cocaine while two Canadian Hells Angels, Pierre Rodrique and David Rouleau, were sent to London to collect their share of the profit. Forwarded by the RCMP, Rouleau and Rodrique were arrested by Scotland Yard after the duo handed over money to the undercover officer to release the cocaine from the port. Nick Clark of the NCIS stated: "When the rooms were searched, they found contact lists for all the U.K. chapters. We suspected they were going to use that for a distribution network". Fisher denies that his chapter was engaged in organised crime and says that the 1994 conspiracy was a work of few rogue members. When Sher and Marsden attempted to interview Fisher to discuss allegations that the Hells Angels are a criminal organisation, he stated during a telephone call: "There is no such thing as justice. I would love to have an intellectual debate with you". Despite being the chapter president, Fisher claimed that he needed permission from his chapter's press officer to have a discussion with Sher and Marsden, which he stated had been denied.

=== The Battersea incident ===
On 31 January 1998, a brawl broke out at the Annual Rockers Reunion at the Battersea Arts Centre in South London between the members of the Outcasts biker gang and the Hells Angels. The reunion was for members of the rockers subculture who had fought against the mods in the 1950s and 1960s. Security at the reunion was provided by members of the Outcasts, and the Hells Angels chose to show up at the event in a demonstration of power. About 40 Hells Angels from chapters from all over England arrived at the Battersea Arts Centre armed with knives, iron bars, machetes, and baseball bats. The Hells Angels coordinated their attacks on the Outcasts via microphone headsets. One Outcast, David Armstrong, was beaten to death in public while another Outcast, Malcolm St. Clair, was stabbed a number of times and later bled to death. Detective Sergeant Brian Charmer of Scotland Yard who investigated the murders stated that the violence was planned, saying: "It was an ambush, an absolute ambush". Assigned along with Charmer to the case was Detective Geoff Hymans. Chamber and Hymans used the traditional British police method of "getting in the face" of suspects as both detectives started to make unsolicited visits to the homes and businesses of Hells Angels. Charmer visited Fisher's motorcycle shop a number of times to talk about the Battersea Arts Centre incident and he recalled: "He'd [Fisher] engage you in a hour's conversation on the virtue of being an Angel. But they found our approach very odd because they're used to the police not bothering them. And they hated it, they just hated it". In pursuit of evidence relating to the attack, Charmer and Hymans raided the clubhouse of Fisher's London chapter. Charmer told Sher and Marsden: "I found a computer with a disk in it. It contained the names and mobile phone numbers of every Angel in the world. There was the membership of every clubhouse".

Clark stated the Battersea attack was ordered by Barger and the other American Hells Angels leaders who were unhappy with the growth of the Outcasts at the expense of the Hells Angels. Clark told Sher and Marsden: "Our intelligence indicated that the reason for the murders was the unauthorised expansion of the Outcasts, and the Angels were told by California to sort it out or lose their charters". Ultimately, Charmer and Hymans arrested three Hells Angels for the murders, namely Ronald "Gut" Waite, the vice president of the Essex chapter along with two "prospects" (the second level in an outlaw biker club), Barry Hollingsworth and Raymond Woodward. The charges against Hollingsworth and Woodward were dropped when a number of witnesses declined to testify following death threats from the Hells Angels, leading to the Crown Attorney prosecuting the case to say there was no prospect of convictions should the case go to trial. Ramak Fazel, a photographer present at the Battersea attack took photographs of Waite wearing blood-stained clothes and carrying a blood-stained axe going to his automobile in the parking lot of the Battersea Arts Centre and despite the death threats, testified for the Crown at Waite's trail. A number of Hells Angels including Fisher testified for Waite at his trial. It was maintained by the defense that the Hells Angels were not a criminal organisation that masqueraded as a motorcycle club as the Crown had claimed and that Waite was merely the victim of persecution by the Crown. As the jury was hung on the issue of murder as the Crown was unable to present conclusive evidence that Waite had inflicted any of the fatal blows with his axe, the Crown Attorney dropped the first degree murder against him and let the conspiracy to cause grievous bodily harm charges stand. The jury convicted Waite of that charge.

=== The Queen's Golden Jubilee ===
One of Fisher's clients at his motorcycle shop was a director of the BBC who invited Fisher and other members of the London chapter to take part in Golden Jubilee parade for Elizabeth II in order to provide some "character" to the event. In June 2002, Fisher took part in the Queen's Golden Jubilee parade in London. At the time, Fisher told the media: "Some people are afraid to be proud to be English. I'm not. I am very patriotic. The Queen and Prince Charles are honourable and caring people". Fisher and 49 other British Hells Angels rode in the Golden Jubilee parade and donated the money from their participation to the Kidscape charity. The participation of the Hells Angels in the Queen's Golden Jubilee parade caused some controversy in the Commonwealth. In other parts of the Commonwealth such as Canada and Australia, the Hells Angels have a much more sinister image than they do in the United Kingdom, which to complaints that it was inappropriate for the Hells Angels to take part in the Golden Jubilee parade.

Sher and Marsden noted that senior ministers in the Labour government of Tony Blair such as Hazel Blears, the Minister of State for Crime Reduction, Policing, Community Safety and Counter-Terrorism, openly took part in Hells Angels sponsored events, which reflected the popular image in the United Kingdom of the Hells Angels as loveable and honourable outcasts from society. Sher and Marsden stated that despite their origins being in the United States, the British Hells Angels tended to wrap themselves up in the Union Jack via such events as the Bulldog Bash as members of the club promote the image of themselves as being the ultra-patriotic defenders of British values. Sher and Marsden wrote that Fisher's ride in the Golden Jubilee parade was the culmination of such efforts to present the Hells Angels as the defender of British values. The British crime expert Tony Thompson disputed the picture of the British Hells Angels as merely a motorcycle club made up of loveable outcasts as he wrote that the Hells Angels are "pure form of organised crime" who have "accomplished in 25 years what it took the Mafia over 200 years to do".

== Books ==
- Sher, Julian; Marsden, William (2006). Angels of Death: Inside the Bikers' Empire of Crime. Toronto: Alfred Knopf Canada. ISBN 9780307370327.
