= Battersea Arts Centre incident =

1998 English gang brawl

The Battersea Arts Centre incident was a brawl between the Outcasts and the Hells Angels at the Battersea Arts Centre in London on 31 January 1998 that left two dead.

== Background ==
Traditionally, security for the Annual Rockers Reunion was provided by the Outcasts biker gang based in London, who had come into conflict with the Hells Angels. The Outcasts had allied themselves with the Outlaws Motorcycle Club who were strong in the Midlands, but weak in the south of England. A "patch over" with the Outcasts joining the Outlaws would result in the English Outlaws outnumbering the English Hells Angels two to one. The British Hells Angels had 230 members while the Outcasts had 200 members. In June 1997, the Outcasts tried to have the Lost Tribe biker gang in Hertfordshire join them, which led to a warning from the Hells Angels that the Outcasts should either join the Hells Angels or disband. A biker war between the Outcasts and the Hells Angels broke shortly afterwards in 1997.

== The incident ==
On 31 January 1998, the Annual Rockers Reunion was being held at the Battersea Arts Centre. The reunion was for members of the rockers subculture of the 1950s and 1960s who had been the opponents of the mods subculture. Members of the Outcasts Motorcycle Club served as the security at the reunion. At dusk, about 40 Hells Angels from almost every chapter in England arrived at the Battersea Arts Centre. The Angels were armed with baseball bats, knives, iron bars and machetes and made a coordinated attack via radio headsets. Orlando Pownall, the Crown Attorney (prosecutor) at the trial of one of the Angels involved, Ronald "Gut" Wait, stated the attack was planned in advance as he stated: "These Hells Angels were not there to enjoy the music, but act as spotters to identify Outcasts so they could be attacked".

The Hells Angels made a series of coordinated attacks, beating and assaulting the Outcasts with their weapons. Most of the Outcasts fled into the centre, but two were caught outside. David "Flipper" Armstrong was dragged from his motorcycle and attacked by the Hells Angels with axes, baseball bats, machetes, iron bars and knives. As Armstrong died, one Hells Angel was heard to shout: "I got the bastard! I got him! I did him!" Another Outcast, Malcom St. Clair, tried to come to Armstrong's aid, but in turn was set upon by the Hells Angels. St. Clair was stabbed eight times and bled to death in front of the Lavender Hill police station. Witnesses described the Angels as being "calm" and the killings as "executions". Detective Sergeant Brian Charmer of the Metropolitan Police told the Canadian journalists Julian Sher and William Marsden in 2006: "They were stabbing him to death in front of the police station. The Angels decided, 'we're going to teach you a lesson'. It was an ambush, an absolute ambush".

The majority of the Angels left on their motorcycles, but one of the Angels, Ronald "Gut" Wait, the vice president of the Essex chapter, was too obese to ride a motorcycle and returned to his automobile in the car park of the Battersea Arts Centre. A photographer, Ramak Fazel, who had gone to photograph the reunion of the rockers, photographed Wait heading towards his car and wrote down his license plate number. Nick Clark of the National Criminal Intelligence Service (NCIS) told Sher and Marsden: "Our intelligence indicated that the reason for the murders was the unauthorised expansion of the Outcasts, and the Angels were told by California to sort it out or lose their charters".

== Operation Middlezoy ==
The Metropolitan Police launched an investigation, Operation Middlezoy, into the double murder. Charmer along with Detective Geoff Hymans were assigned to solve the murders. The police found a scene of chaos with the parking lot of the Battersea Arts Centre drenched in blood and full of abandoned weapons. Hymans told Sher and Marsden: "You try to stick your finger in their dike at the last minute and try to keep whatever is left of a dwindling crime scene". Charmer stated: "We knew we had a problem because of the audacity of it. It was obvious the Angels weren't concerned about witnesses. There was no attempt at disguise. It was in your face–stay out of this". Both Hymans and Charmer were hindered by their lack of intelligence about the British Hells Angels. The NCIS had only full time officer, Nick Clark, assigned to outlaw biker gangs. Clark gave Hymans and Charmer a briefing, but both officers complained that the NCIS did not have much information about the Hells Angels.

Both Charmer and Hymans used the traditional British police method of "getting in the face" of suspects, making a number of unsolicited visits to the homes and businesses of the Hells Angels while confronting them on the streets. Hymans stated: "We decided that we'd just call them unannounced, walk in their shops, knock on their doors. They hated it". Both Charmer and Hymans also interviewed the wives and girlfriends of the Hells Angels out of the hope that one of the women might say something that would provide enough evidence to lay charges. Hymans visited the T-shirt shop of Guy "Tricky Tramp" Lawrence, the secretary of the Angels' London chapter. Hymans stated: "We would wander in there and have a cup of tea. 'Cause he's just a bloke, at the end of the day. You just have a chat". Charmer visited Alan "Snob" Fisher, the president of the Hells Angels London chapter, at his motorcycle shop. Charmer recalled: "He'd [Fisher] engage you in a hour's conversation on the virtue of being an Angel. But they found our approach very odd because they're used to the police not bothering them. And they hated it, they just hated it". The intention behind the "getting in the face" tactic was to rattle the Hells Angels out of the hope that one or more might make a mistake that would provide the evidence for Charmer and Hymans to lay charges.

In March 1998, Charmer and Hymans launched a series of raids on the Hells Angels clubhouses across England. At the clubhouse of the Wolverhampton chapter, known locally as "the Fort", the police used a JCB digger to smash in the front wall. The Hells Angel on guard at "the Fort" told the police: "You could have knocked on the door. I'd have opened it". Found inside of the Wolverhampton clubhouse was a Bren machine gun and a number of ecstasy pills. In a raid on the clubhouse of the London chapter, Charmer stated: "I found a computer with a disk in it. It contained the names and mobile phone numbers of every Angel in the world. There was the membership of every clubhouse". Charmer stated that the American authorities "went ballistic" for the disk and an agent of the United States Bureau of Alcohol, Tobacco, Firearms and Explosives was sent to London to take a copy of the disk. Ultimately, Charmer and Hymans arrested three Hells Angels for the murders. The trio charged were Ronald "Gut" Wait, the vice president of the Essex chapter, and two "prospects" with the Essex chapter, Barry Hollingsworth and Raymond Woodward.

== Trial ==
In November 1998, just before the trial was planned to start, the Crown Attorney in charge of the case, Orlando Pownall, dropped the charges of first degree murder against Woodward and Hollingsworth. Pownall told the court: "The witnesses have declined to come to court. It would not be prudent in the circumstances for me to go into the reasons for it". By contrast, a photographer present at the incident, Ramak Fazel, had taken photographs of Wait lumbering into his car in the parking lot of the Battersea Arts Centre wearing clothing soaked in blood while carrying a blood stained ax. Despite death threats against him and his family, Fazel proved willing to testify for the Crown against Wait. Hymans stated: "He was absolutely appalled at what had happened. He was the type of person to say 'it my moral duty. I don't want to do it, but I have to'". Two Outcasts were willing to break the outlaw biker code and testify for the Crown anonymously, a request that was refused by Justice Geoffrey Grigson. Witness C, as one of the Outcasts willing to testify for the Crown was known, stated: "The Angels wanted the Outcasts to join them as junior members. It was more like a threat than an invitation. I believe the murders were a show of strength to warn 'If you don't join us we'll destroy you'."

At the trial at the Old Bailey courthouse, a number of Hells Angels appeared to testify that the group was just a motorcycle club, not a criminal organisation that posed as a motorcycle club. Wait testified that he was not in London on the night of the murders, but rather drinking in the Angel clubhouse in Reading. One Hells Angel testified that Wait was in Reading on the night of the murder, but Pownall pointed out a number of inconsistencies in his testimony and accused him of perjury. The photographs taken by Fazel provided conclusive evidence that Wait was at the Battersea Arts Centre while his blood-stained clothing and ax strongly suggested that he been involved in the violence.

After four days of deliberation, the jury was deadlocked as the Crown had presented evidence that Wait was present at the attack and had taken part in the violence, but the jury did not feel that the Crown had established that Wait had inflicted the fatal blows with his ax on Armstrong or St. Clair. Pownall dropped the first degree murder charges against Wait, but let stand the conspiracy to cause grievous bodily harm charges. On 23 November 1998, the jury convicted Wait of conspiracy to cause grievous bodily harm. Charmer recalled: "Wait was shocked. Absolutely stunned" at the verdict. Grigson sentenced Wait to fifteen years in prison and told him: "You took an active part in a conspiracy which led to the deaths of two men. In truth, they were executed in a manner that was ruthless as it was arrogant". Sue Grimoldby, the girlfriend of Armstrong and the mother of his son, told the media after Wait's conviction: "I'd like to think the Angels had a sense of shame. But I doubt it. David just wanted to enjoy the concert. He wouldn't have gone there if he'd known there'd be trouble. I think he was targeted because he was exposed. He was so loving. Now our son will have to grow up without a father."

Wait, who was morbidly obese, died of a heart attack in prison in 1999. Woodward and Hollingsworth were both promoted up to being "full patch" Hells Angels. Charmer admitted that the investigation was something of a failure with only one of the 40 Hells Angels involved being convicted. Charmer stated: "It hurt because we put a lot of work into it. But we have been warned they'd do it: get to your witnesses and you've got no case".

== See also ==
- Hells Angels MC criminal allegations and incidents in the United Kingdom

== Books ==
- Sher, Julian; Marsden, William (2006). Angels of Death: Inside the Bikers' Empire of Crime. Toronto: Alfred Knopf Canada. ISBN 9780307370327.
