= Global Gathering =

2001–2014 dance music festival

- Genre: Dance Music
- Dates: Last weekend in July
- Location: Various locations
- Years active: 2001 – 2014
- Attendance: 55,000
- Website: Global Gathering Worldwide

Global Gathering was an annual dance music festival by Angel Festivals Limited. Festivals are held in countries such as the UK, Poland, Russia, Belarus, Ukraine and feature leading electronic music artists from around the globe. The festival ran from 2001 to 2014; the concept came about following enormous interest in the opening Code club (now Air), the home of Godskitchen. The organisers recognised that there was room to expand dance music from clubs to outdoor music festival venues.

== Locations ==
- (United Kingdom) Long Marston Airfield, Long Marston, Warwickshire, England
- Tor Poznań, Poznań, Poland
- Borovaya Airfield, Belarus
- Chaika Airfield, Kyiv, Ukraine
- Tuutary Park, Saint Petersburg, Russia
- Seoul Olympic Stadium, Seoul, South Korea
- (Georgia (country)) Rustavi International Motorpark, Rustavi, Georgia

== History ==
Global Gathering 2008 Promo Poster

Held on the last weekend of July each year, GlobalGathering in the UK established itself as a major UK dance festival since it began in 2001. It was held at Long Marston Airfield near Stratford-upon-Avon. It provided entertainment from a range of electronic genres, and includes live acts, drum and bass, house, trance and dubstep. The festival grew to play host to over one hundred acts on sixteen stages, and twice won the award for Best UK Festival in the DJ Magazine awards, including 2010.

On 18 March 2006, Global Gathering travelled to Miami, Florida. The festival included acts such as Nine Inch Nails, Coheed and Cambria, Avenged Sevenfold, Deep Dish, Adam Freeland, Sasha, John Digweed and others. In 2008, GlobalGathering shows included Poland, Belarus, Ukraine, Russia, Turkey, Australia, and Malaysia. In 2009, Poland, Belarus, Turkey, Ukraine, Russia, South Korea and Australia played host.

On 28 July 2012, during the Global Gathering 2012 event, paramedics were called to Long Marston Airfield near Stratford-upon-Avon after a 24-year-old man had been found unconscious in his tent. Despite efforts to resuscitate him, he died. It is the first death in the 12-year history of the annual festival.

Global Gathering 2014 recorded the second death during the event's 14-year history.

On 26 October 2014 the promoters of Global Gathering, Angel Festivals Limited, announced the festival will not take place in 2015. A statement on their website read:

"After 13 years of delivering one of the UK’s most successful electronic dance music events, the promoters of the GlobalGathering UK festival have decided that the festival will take a break in 2015 in order for all elements of the show to be reviewed ensuring GG remains at the heart of the UK dance market. This will not affect any of the GG club shows in the UK or international GG events. Thanks to all of our loyal fans for your continued support, please check the website for further updates".

== List of Global Gatherings ==
- Global Gathering 2001
- Global Gathering 2002
- Global Gathering 2003
- Global Gathering 2004
- Global Gathering 2005
- Global Gathering 2006
- Global Gathering 2007
- Global Gathering 2008
- Global Gathering 2009
- Global Gathering 2010
- Global Gathering 2011
- Global Gathering 2012
- Global Gathering 2013 took place on 26 and 27 July.
- Global Gathering 2014 took place on 25 and 26 July, with an attendance of 55,000.

== Notes ==
- Report about GlobalGathering Russia 2009
- Report about GlobalGathering Russia 2010

== See also ==
- List of electronic music festivals
