= Chris Dale (footballer) =

English footballer

Personal information
- Full name: Christopher Dale
- Date of birth: 16 April 1950 (age 76)
- Place of birth: York, England
- Position: Winger

Senior career*
Years	Team	Apps	(Gls)
1968	York City	5	(0)
1971–1978	Scarborough		
1979–????	Bridlington Trinity		
- * Club domestic league appearances and goals

Christopher Dale (born 16 April 1950) is an English former professional footballer who played as a winger in the Football League for York City, in non-League football for Scarborough and Bridlington Trinity.
