= 1984 John Player Special League =

- Administrator(s): Test and County Cricket Board
- Cricket format: Limited overs cricket (40 overs per innings)
- Tournament format(s): League
- Champions: Essex (2nd title)
- Participants: 17
- Matches: 136
- Most runs: 720 Chris Smith (Hampshire)
- Most wickets: 29 Wayne Daniel (Middlesex)

The 1984 John Player Special League was the sixteenth competing of what was generally known as the Sunday League. The competition was won for the second time by Essex County Cricket Club.

== Standings ==
Team	Pld	W	T	L	N/R	A	Pts	R/R
Essex (C)	16	12	1	3	0	0	50	5.338
Nottinghamshire	16	10	0	5	0	1	42	5.181
Sussex	16	9	0	4	1	2	42	4.876
Lancashire	16	10	0	6	0	0	40	4.653
Middlesex	16	9	1	5	1	0	40	5.085
Worcestershire	16	9	0	5	1	1	40	4.549
Warwickshire	16	7	0	6	2	1	34	5.282
Surrey	16	7	0	7	1	1	32	5.130
Glamorgan	16	6	0	8	2	0	28	4.967
Hampshire	16	7	0	9	0	0	28	5.420
Kent	16	6	0	8	1	1	28	4.963
Northamptonshire	16	6	0	9	1	0	26	5.067
Gloucestershire	16	5	0	9	0	2	24	4.753
Leicestershire	16	4	0	8	3	1	24	4.956
Somerset	16	5	0	9	1	1	24	4.832
Yorkshire	16	6	0	10	0	0	24	4.962
Derbyshire	16	4	0	11	0	1	18	5.321
Team marked (C) finished as champions. Source: CricketArchive

== See also ==
Sunday League
