= Rock and Blues Custom Show =

- Genre: Rock, heavy metal, punk
- Dates: Usually the last Thursday to Sunday in July
- Locations: The Coney Grey Showground Pentrich, Derbyshire, England
- Years active: Since 1983

The Rock and Blues Custom Show is a four-day rock music festival held annually at Pentrich, England. It usually takes place on the last Thursday to Sunday in July.
