= Simon Baker (pilot) =

British aviator

Simon Baker is an aviator and the Chief Flying Instructor at Freedom Sports Aviation (Long Marston, Warwickshire). He has three times been Microlight World Champion (1996, 1999, & 2003) and six times British Champion.

He has also taken part in several microlighting expeditions, including filming a Channel 4 documentary over Iceland in 1983, flying in the Himalayas near Everest in 1986, and was a pilot/spotter for the ThrustSSC team in Jordan and in Black Rock Desert, Nevada.

== Titles and awards ==
- Fédération Aéronautique Internationale (FAI) Diamond Colibri award for outstanding Microlight or Paramotor achievement, 2008.
- World Microlight Champion, and Gold (dual flexwing, with Anita Holmes) 2003
- British Champion (dual microlight, with Anita Holmes) 2001
- Silver Medal of the Royal Aero Club, 1999
- World Champion, and Gold (dual trike, with Anita Holmes), World Championships 1999 Kecskemet, Hungary
- British Champion, 1998
- World Champion, British Team Gold, and Gold (Weight-Shift Two Seater Class), 1996 World Microlight Championships (Cato Ridge, near Durban, South Africa)
