= Atom Seed =

British hard rock band

- Origin: London, England
- Genres: [Funk metal], funk metal
- Years active: 1989–1993
- Labels: FM Revolver Records, London Records
- Past members: Paul Cunningham; Simon James; Chris Huxter; Amir; Chris Dale; Jerry Hawkins
- Website: myspace.com/atomseedband

Atom Seed was an English funk metal band formed in London in 1989. They released their debut album, Get in Line, in 1990. They were popular in the early 1990s.

== History ==
Atom Seed were formed in early 1989 in London, England, after former Zoodoll guitarist Simon James and bassist Chris Huxter met with singer Paul Cunningham and the Iranian-born drummer Amir. Huxter left in late 1989 and was replaced by Chris Dale on bass. The band toured the UK as headliners, and also supporting Wolfsbane and Red Hot Chili Peppers. Their debut EP was released in early 1990, followed in 1991 by the album Get in Line on FM Revolver Records. Amir was replaced by Jerry Hawkins (formerly of Metal Monkey Machine) on drums before the band's debut European tour. They were signed to London Records for the Dead Happy EP in 1992, but were dropped from the label and split up soon after, with an unreleased album, Hard Sell Paranoia, shelved.

Following the dissolution of Atom Seed, Chris Dale went on to perform, record, and write for Iron Maiden's Bruce Dickinson. Dale now plays for the British heavy metal band Tank as well as his own pop rock band, Sack Trick. Simon James formed the band Moko Jumbi, recording an album for A&M Records in 1996 which remained unreleased after the label folded. In 2006, he released an acoustic album The Old Straight Track for Stovepony Records under the name 'Onions', launched at the Green Man Festival.

== Discography ==
=== LPs ===
- Get in Line (1990) FM Revolver Records / (1991) London Records Worldwide

Tracks: "What You Say", "Get in Line", "Rebel", "Shake That Thing", "Shot Down", "Forget it Joe", "Better Day", "What?!", "Castles in the Sky", "Bitchin'", "What You Say" (Live), "Burn" (Live)

- Hard Sell Paranoia (1992) Unreleased

Tracks: "Enemy Song", "Love Money Hate", "Best of Life", "Mother Junk", "Tastes Like Money", "Idiots", "Delusions", "Changing Years", "Shadows", "Rooms", "Hard Sell Paranoia"

=== EPs ===
- I Don't Want To Talk About It (1990) ORG/FM Revolver Records

Tracks: "Doghouse", "Sexbeat", "Shake That Thing", "What?!"

- Rebel (1991) London Records

Tracks: "Rebel", "Everybody", "Forget It Joe", "Fools To Fall"

- Get in Line (1991) London Records

Tracks: "Get in Line", "Castles in the Sky", "What You Say" (Live), "Burn" (Live)

- Split with Sepultura – Rock Power Magazine (1991) : Tracks: Sepultura – "Dead Embryonic Cells"; Atom Seed – "Get in Line"
- Dead Happy (1992) London Records

Tracks: "Happy", "What Gives?", "Fear", "The Assassin"
