= Shakespeare County Raceway =

Coordinates: 52°8′14.54″N 1°45′26.16″W

- Location: Stratford-upon-Avon, Warwickshire, England
- Opened: 1973
- Closed: 2018
- Former names: Long Marston Raceway; Avon Park Raceway
- Major events: British National Drag Racing Championships
- Website: Shakespeare County Raceway

Dragstrip
- Surface: Asphalt
- Length: 0.4 km (0.25 miles)

Located near Stratford-upon-Avon in Warwickshire, England, Shakespeare County Raceway became a permanent drag racing facility in 1980 when it was known as 'Long Marston Raceway'.

Situated on the former RAF Long Marston station which became Long Marston Airfield, drag racing events occurred on the site sporadically since the early 1970s.

In 1990 the track became known as 'Avon Park Raceway', advertised as "Spectacular drag racing for cars and bikes at the fastest track outside the USA", In 2008 it finally became Shakespeare County Raceway Ltd.

SCR is generally considered to be Britain's 'second' dragstrip after Santa Pod Raceway.

In late 2017, planning applications were submitted by Cala to build initially 400 homes on the site, followed eventually by a further 3,100 to be known as Marston Mead Garden Village.

Local newspaper Stratford Herald reported in December 2017 that a Stratford local council document established that potentially up to £100 million funding from the developer Cala would need to be assured, to be invested widely into infrastructure improvements, including roads, public transport, schools and doctors' surgeries.

Their official website now states the raceway closed in 2018.
