= Bulldog Bash =

Annual motorcycle rally held in England

- Fight for your right to party

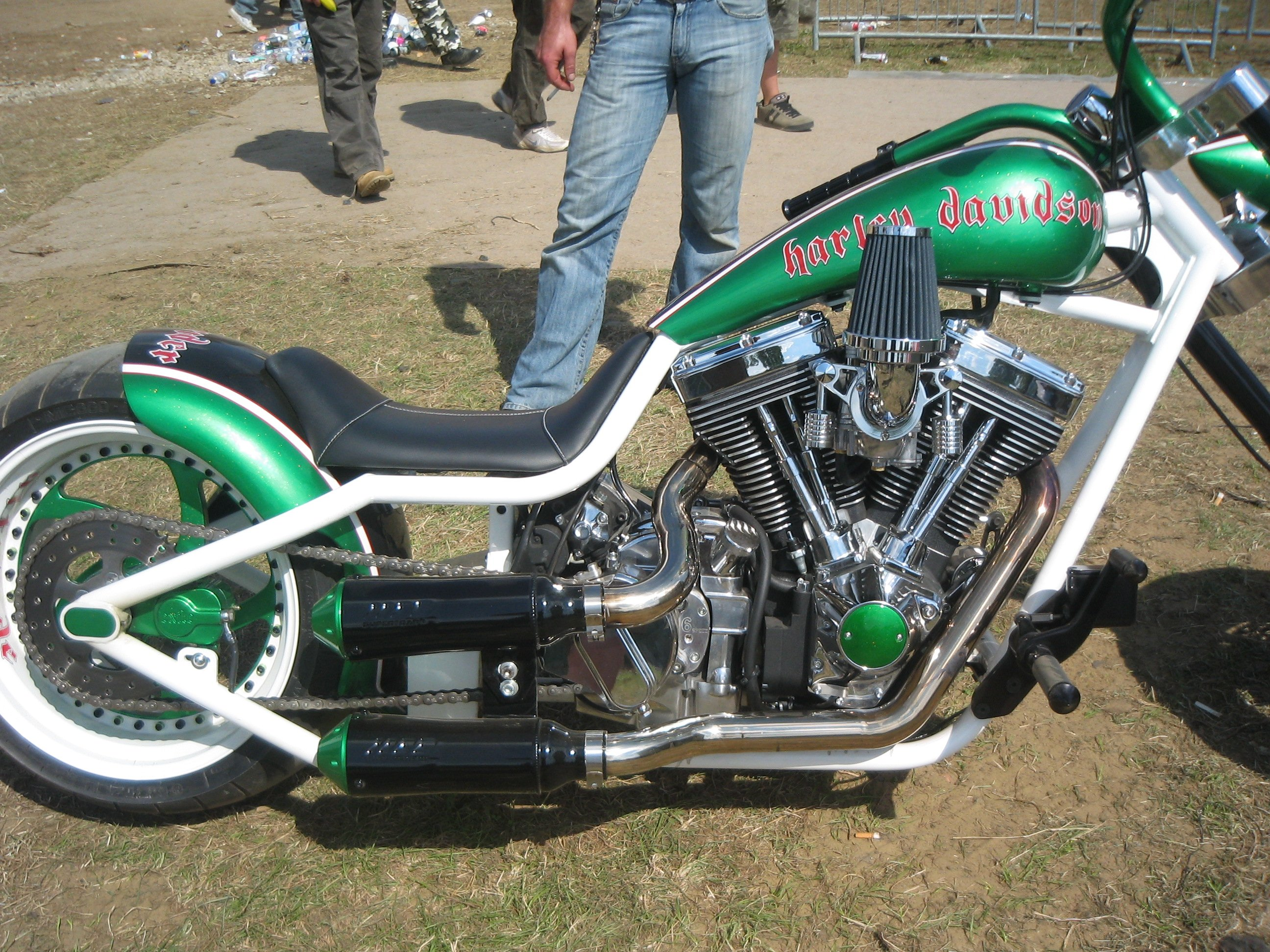
- Status: Defunct
- Genre: Motorcycle rally & Rock music
- Frequency: Annual
- Venue: Shakespeare County Raceway
- Locations: Long Marston, near Stratford-upon-Avon
- Country: England
- Inaugurated: 1987
- Founder: Hells Angels
- Most recent: 2017
- Website: Bulldog Bash (archived)

The Bulldog Bash was an annual motorcycle rally, with a reported attendance of 50,000 people in 2007. It was held over a weekend in mid-August, at the former Shakespeare County Raceway, situated outside of Stratford-upon-Avon in England. The last event was in 2017, as the planned 2018 weekend was cancelled due to the venue being sold for housing development.

== History ==
The event started as a small gathering organised by the Hells Angels motorcycle club for bikers. Since 1987, the event grew to one of the largest motorcycle festivals in Europe, with a record 50,000 people reported to have attended in 2007.

The festival was hosted at the Shakespeare County Raceway in the village of Long Marston, Warwickshire, England since 1987, and always occurred in mid-August. Since its inception, it has followed largely the same format (though expanded for larger crowds and included bigger name bands): providing entertainment aimed at the motorcycle riding fraternity, including live rock music, beer tents, motorcycle racing, drag racing and stunt riding demonstrations. Adult entertainment traditionally featured high on the bill, including a wet T-shirt contest, erotic dance shows and a topless bike wash.

In April 2013 it was announced that the 2013 event had been cancelled. The event returned in 2014 and for 2015.

== Security and crime ==
Inspector Dave Patterson from the Warwickshire Police is quoted to have said about the 2006 event: "There was just four crimes reported on site and only three arrests during the four-day event. Although traffic to and from the Long Marston site was greater than normal, the traffic plan worked well."

== Charities ==
The Hells Angels's Bulldog Bash 2015 raised £750 for the Coventry and Warwickshire Living Well with Dementia Partnership charity.
