= Thomas Denny (artist) =

British stained glass artist (born 1956)

- Born: Thomas Francis Coningham Denny; 12 May 1956 (age 70); London
- Education: Edinburgh College of Art
- Known for: Stained glass
- Elected: British Society of Master Glass Painters

Thomas Denny (born 12 May 1956), sometimes known professionally as Tom Denny, is a British stained-glass artist and painter. His works can be found in more than fifty locations, primarily in England, including windows in the cathedrals of Durham, Gloucester, Hereford, Leicester and Oxford.

== Early life and education ==
Thomas Francis Coningham Denny was born on 12 May 1956 in London, United Kingdom. He was raised in a family with strong artistic connections: his mother, Ann Catherine Denny, was a painter, and his father, Sir Anthony Denny, was an architect and theatre designer.

Denny was educated at King Alfred School in Hampstead before studying painting at Edinburgh College of Art. During his time in Edinburgh he developed an interest in historical stained glass and the possibilities of colour and light within architecture. Although initially trained as a painter, he began exploring stained-glass design in the late 1970s, combining painterly techniques with traditional glass-making processes.

== Painting career ==
Before becoming primarily known for stained glass, Denny worked for many years as a painter. During the 1980s and 1990s he exhibited paintings in galleries in London and New York, establishing a reputation for expressive works informed by landscape and architecture. His background in painting continued to influence his later work in glass. Critics and commentators have noted that the painterly qualities of his stained-glass designs - particularly their attention to colour relationships and compositional balance - derive directly from his training as a painter.

Although Denny continued to paint, he gradually shifted his focus toward commissions for stained glass windows, which allowed him to create artworks integrated into architectural and ecclesiastical settings. By the mid-1990s he was primarily recognised for his work in this medium.

== Stained-glass practice ==
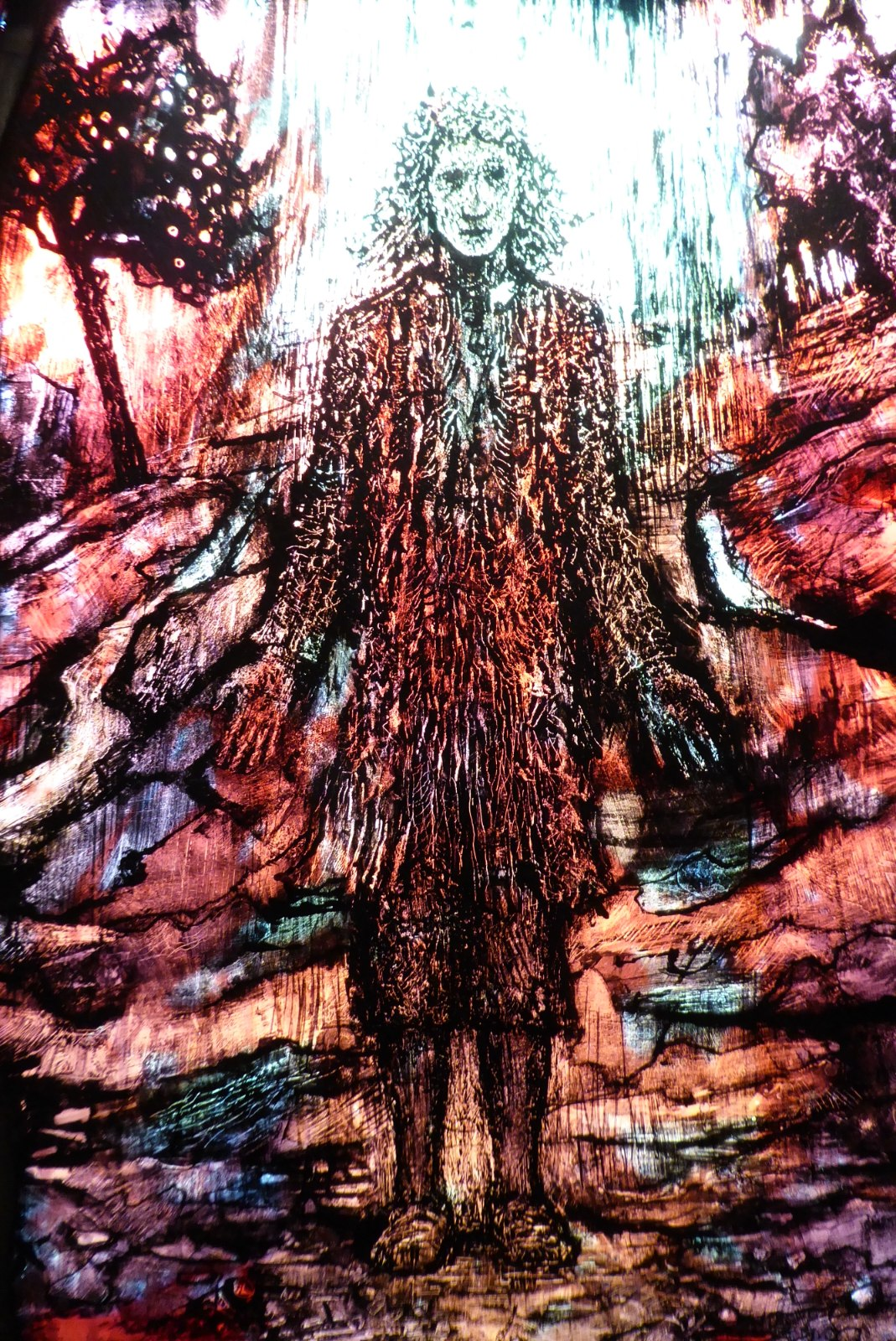
Traherne Window, Hereford Cathedral (detail)

Denny’s stained glass is characterised by its use of vivid colour, layered imagery and changing effects of light across the surface of the glass. His windows routinely combine narrative imagery with references to landscape, natural forms and the history of the buildings and communities in which they are found.

Although stylistically modern, Denny works largely with traditional materials and techniques used in medieval stained glass, including flashed glass, silver stain and painted detail. A distinctive feature of his work is the use of acid-etching on flashed glass to remove layers of colour and produce subtle tonal variations. This technique allows a wide range of colour effects within a single piece of glass and contributes to the complexity of his compositions.

Denny has described stained glass as a medium that operates simultaneously as colour, light and narrative. Because windows change in appearance depending on the time of day and the weather, he regards stained glass as a form of “slow art”, encouraging contemplation and repeated viewing.

=== Major commissions ===
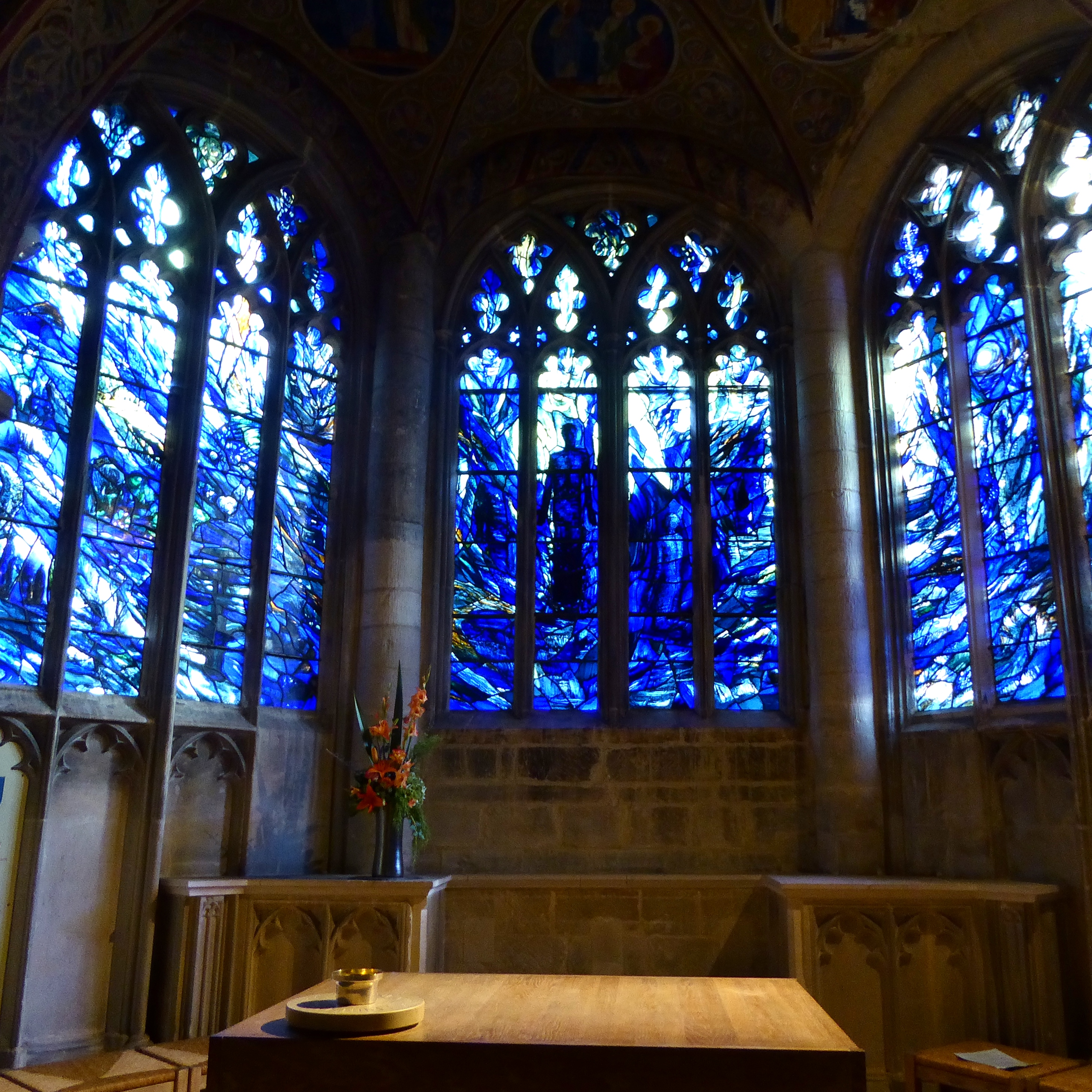
Denny's tryptich of windows for Gloucester Cathedral (1992)

Since the 1980s Denny has completed more than fifty commissions in stained glass, primarily for churches and cathedrals. A large majority of these windows are installed in buildings in England, with examples also present in Germany, Ireland, Scotland and the United States. As a consequence, Denny’s work can now be found in many prominent ecclesiastical buildings, including the cathedrals of Durham, Gloucester, Hereford and Leicester.

Denny's five windows at Gloucester Cathedral are the product of three distinct commissions spanning more than 20 years. Three of these windows form a triptych in the south ambulatory chapel dedicated to St Thomas, which were installed in 1992 to commemorate the 900th anniversary of the cathedral's foundation. The centre window depicts the New Testament story of Thomas in the presence of the risen Christ, while the windows to either side are based on Psalm 148, praising God’s creation. In the south chapel off the Lady Chapel are two more windows by Denny, individually dedicated to the composers Ivor Gurney and Gerald Finzi, installed in 2014 and 2016 respectively. Each has eight individual lights, with older stained glass preserved in the tracery lights above.

At Hereford Cathedral, Denny provided two windows inspired by the writings of the 17th-century cleric and poet Thomas Traherne who was born in the city. Installed in 2007, they occupy the lower level of the small, 16th-century, two-storey chantry chapel dedicated to Bishop Edmund Audley, located off the Lady Chapel.

In 2010, a large four-light window was unveiled in the south quire aisle of Durham Cathedral in memory of Archbishop Michael Ramsey. A multilayered depiction of the Transfiguration of Jesus, Denny's design combines biblical figures with individuals from the history of Durham. The Cathedral itself is shown, with pilgrims making their way towards the shrine of St Cuthbert within. St Cuthbert himself is shown praying on the island of Inner Farne.

At Leicester Cathedral, Denny was commissioned to provide two windows for St Katherine's Chapel on the theme of redemption. Installed in 2016, they are situated close to the newly unveiled tomb of King Richard III following his reinternment at the Cathedral. Denny incorporated into his design scenes inspired by the life of Richard as metaphors for key themes and verses of the Bible. The windows are also replete with details relating to the city and county of Leicester, including a football added immediately before installation celebrating Leicester City Football Club's unprecedented 2015/16 Premier League triumph.

In 2022, Denny’s new window for Trinity Church Wall Street in New York was inaugurated. Positioned directly above the main entrance to the church on Broadway, the window illustrates both the Parable of the Talents and the Judgment of the Nations, taken from the Gospel of Matthew.

In 2025, Christ Church Cathedral in Oxford unveiled a stained-glass window by Denny that depicts the parable of the Prodigal Son. Denny design is intended to complement the 17th-century window by Dutch artist Abraham van Linge that fills the opening immediately adjacent.

=== Influences and artistic themes ===
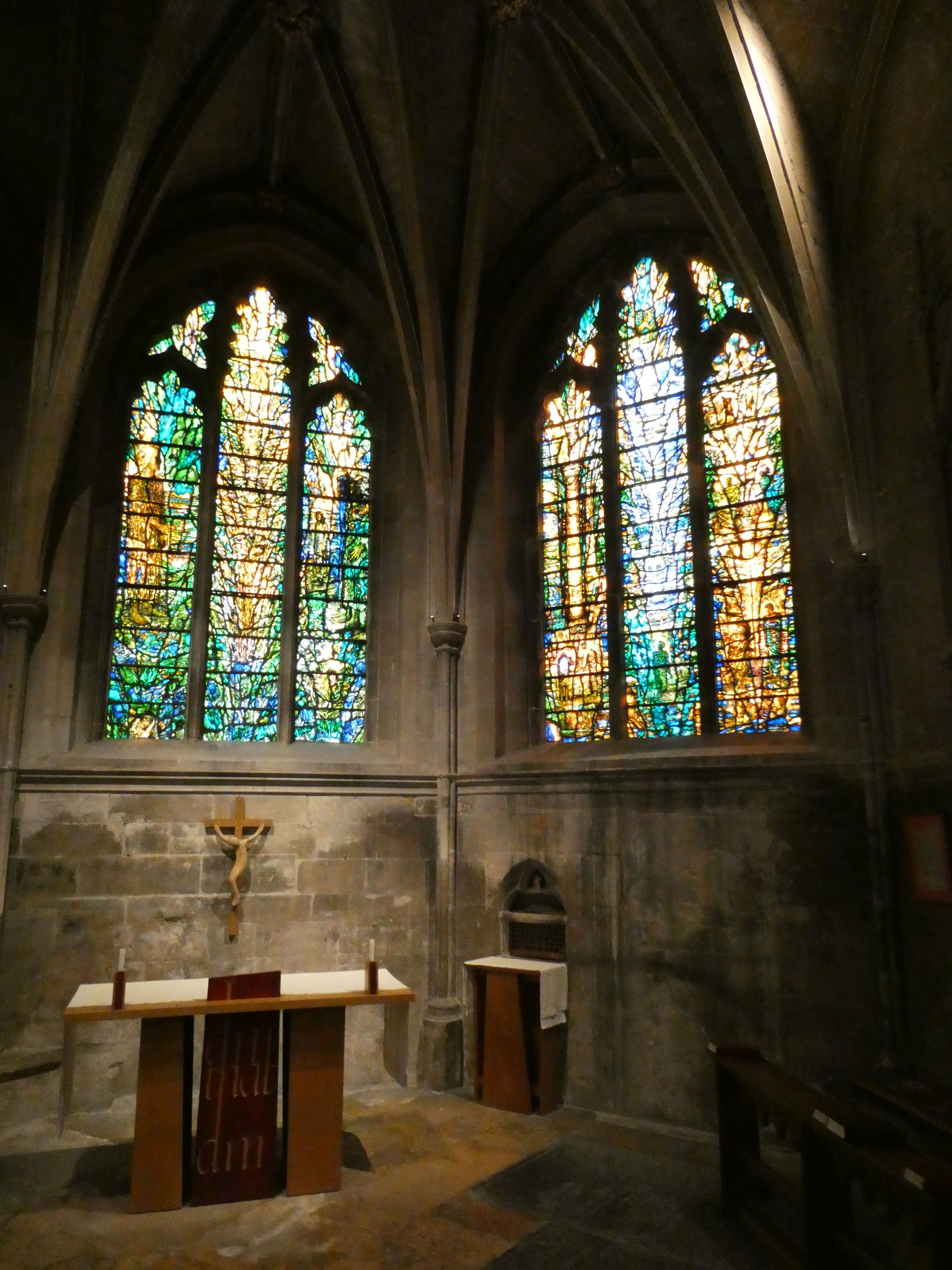
Denny's windows at Tewkesbury Abbey (2002)

Denny’s work draws inspiration from both historical stained-glass traditions and a wide range of artistic influences. He has cited the colour and vitality of medieval stained glass as a major inspiration, along with the work of artists such as Rembrandt and Albrecht Dürer. Other influences include the landscapes and visionary imagery of Samuel Palmer, the sculptural forms of Henry Moore, and the richly coloured stained glass of the Irish artist Harry Clarke.

A recurring theme in Denny’s work is the relationship between spiritual ideas and the natural world. His windows frequently depict plants, landscapes and animals alongside biblical imagery, suggesting connections between religious narratives and the environment in which the buildings stand.Many of his designs also incorporate references to local history, literature and community life, reflecting his view that stained glass should respond to the cultural and historical context of the site where it is installed.

== Personal life ==
Denny’s studio is located in the Blackmore Vale of Dorset, where he lives and works. Denny married Benita Jane Kevill-Davies in 1985. They have two grown up children, Madeline and Ezekiel.

Denny is the heir presumptive to the Denny Baronetcy of Castle Moyle, a title created in the Baronetage of Ireland on 12 January 1782 for Sir Barry Denny. His Father, Sir Anthony Coningham de Waltham Denny, was the 8th Baronet. The present holder of the title is Denny’s older brother, Sir Piers Anthony de Waltham Denny, 9th Baronet. Tralee Castle in Tralee, the county town of County Kerry, has been the historic seat of the Denny family since 1586, though it has been a ruin since the early 19th century. In 2017 Denny created a window on the theme of reconciliation for St John's Roman Catholic Church in Tralee.

== List of works ==
Killearn Kirk, Killearn, Stirlingshire

- North aisle, two windows - St Columba and St Kentigerna (1983)

St Christopher's Church, Warden Hill, Cheltenham, Gloucestershire

- Nave, ten windows - Ten parables from the Four Gospels (1985-1995)

St Gabriel's Church, Hanley Swan, Worcestershire

- St Giles' chapel - Landscape around Malvern (1987)

St Michael's Church, Thurmaston, Leicestershire

- North and south aisles - abstract compositions (1988); South chancel window - St Raphael the healer (1989)

Diozesanmuseum, Regensburg, Bavaria, Germany

- Bishop of Regensburg (1988)

St John's Church, Accrington, Lancashire

- South sanctuary - Road to Emmaus (1989)

St Mary's Church, Powerstock, Dorset

- South aisle, west - abstract composition (1991)

St Ambrose's Church, Leyland, Lancashire

- North nave - figures in landscape (1991)

Gloucester Cathedral, Gloucestershire

- St Thomas's chapel, three windows - St Thomas and Psalm 148 (1992); Lady Chapel, two windows - Ivor Gurney window (2014), Gerald Finzi window (2016)

St Michael's Church, Eastington, Stroud, Gloucestershire

- North aisle, two windows - Tree of Life and Water of Life (1993 - designed in collaboration with Richard Webb)

St John's Church, Slimbridge, Gloucestershire

- South aisle, west - Sir Peter Scott window (1994)

St Andrew's Church, Miserden, Gloucestershire (2026)

St Andrew's Church, Nuthurst, Sussex

- North nave - Abstract composition (1995)

St Peter's Church, Upper Slaughter, Gloucestershire

- North aisle, east - Landscape (1995); North chapel - Landscape with figure (1995)

St James's Church, Milton Clevedon, Somerset

- North transept - Tree of Life (1996)

Bridport Hospital chapel, Dorset

- Window (1997)

St Osmund's Church, Tarlton, Gloucestershire

- Nave, four windows - St Matthew, St Mark, St Luke, St John (1997)

St Peter's Church, Martley, Worcestershire

- West tower - Millennium window (1999)

All Saints' Church, Bolton Percy, Yorkshire

- North aisle, west - Millennium window (2000)

St Mary' Church, Tarrant Hinton, Dorset

- South aisle - Millennium window (2000)

Emmanuel Church, Bridlington, Yorkshire

- Lady chapel, two multi-panel windows - Psalm 104, with detail based on marine landscape near Bridlington (2000-2002)

St Peter's Church, Stutton, Suffolk

- West window - Millennium window (2001)

Tewkesbury Abbey, Gloucestershire

- Chapel of St Catherine and St John the Baptist, two windows - Benedictine motto ‘to work is to pray’ (2002)

St Peter's Church, Hinton St Mary, Dorset

- Nave, four panels - Isiah 44:23 "Sing, O ye heavens; for the LORD hath done it" (2002)

Great Malvern Priory, Worcestershire

- St Giles' chapel, two windows - millennium windows on theme of Psalm 36 (2003)

St Helen's and All Saints' Church, Wykeham, Yorkshire

- South aisle window (2004)

Whitburn parish church, Tyne & Wear

- West window - Psalm 107 (2005)

Sunderland Minster, Tyne & Wear

- Bede chapel, three windows - Prayer in the life of Bede and St Benedict Biscop (2006)

Hereford Cathedral, Herefordshire

- Audley chapel, two windows - Thomas Traherne windows (2007)

St Margaret's Church, Millington, Yorkshire

- South nave - Road to Emmaus (2007)

St Peter’s Church, Ipsley, Worcestershire

- South nave - Holy Spirit (2008)

St Mary’s Church, Temple Guiting, Gloucestershire

- South nave - Psalm 111 (2010)

Durham Cathedral, County Durham

- South choir aisle - Transfiguration Window (2010)

St Michael’s Church, Abenhall, Gloucestershire

- West tower - Freeminers Window (2011)

St Hedda's Church, Egton Bridge, Yorkshire

- North aisle - Father Postgate window (2011)

St Edburga’s Church, Leigh, Worcestershire

- South aisle - Landscape (2012)

St Catharine's College, Cambridge

- Chapel - Wisdom Window (2012)

All Saints' Church, Woodford, Wiltshire

- South Chapel - Psalm 65 (2013)

St James' Church, Stanstead Abbotts, Herts

- Baeche chapel - Psalms 37 and 84 (2013)

St Michael and St Mary Magdalene's Church, Easthampstead, Bracknell, Berkshire

- Porch - Baptism of King Cynegils by St Birinus (2013)

St Paul’s Church, Shurdington, Gloucestershire

- South aisle, two windows - David Davis Window with Cotswold view (2013); Betty Wiggins Jones Window 'Creation' (2015)

Leicester Cathedral, Leicestershire

- St Katherine's chapel, two windows - Redemption (2016)

St Peter’s Church, Wallsend, Newcastle, Tyne & Wear

- South nave - Stella Maris (2017)

St John’s Roman Catholic Church, Tralee, County Kerry, Ireland

- South aisle - Reconciliation Window (2017)

St Bartholomew's Church, Wigginton, Hertfordshire

- South nave, pulpit window - Victoria Cross window in memory of Private James Osborne VC (2019)

St Felix’s Church, Felixstowe, Suffolk

- Nave, two windows - The divine mercy visions of St Faustina (2018)

St James’s Church, Grafton Underwood, Northamptonshire

- Chancel, three windows - Let there be Light (south wall), Christ as the Light of the World (east wall), Let your light so shine before men (north wall) (2020)

Chapel Barn, Wilderness Estate, Suffolk

- East window - Suffolk landscape (2020)

Trinity Church, New York, United States

- West window - The Parable of the Talents and the Judgment of the Nations (2022)

All Saints' Church, Down Ampney, Gloucestershire

- Chancel - Robin Ivison window, Pilgrim's Progress (2022)

St John the Baptist's Church, Tisbury, Wiltshire

- East chancel - Transfiguration window on theme of 'seeing' (2024)

Christ Church Cathedral, Oxford

- North aisle - Parable of the Prodigal Son (2025)

== Gallery ==
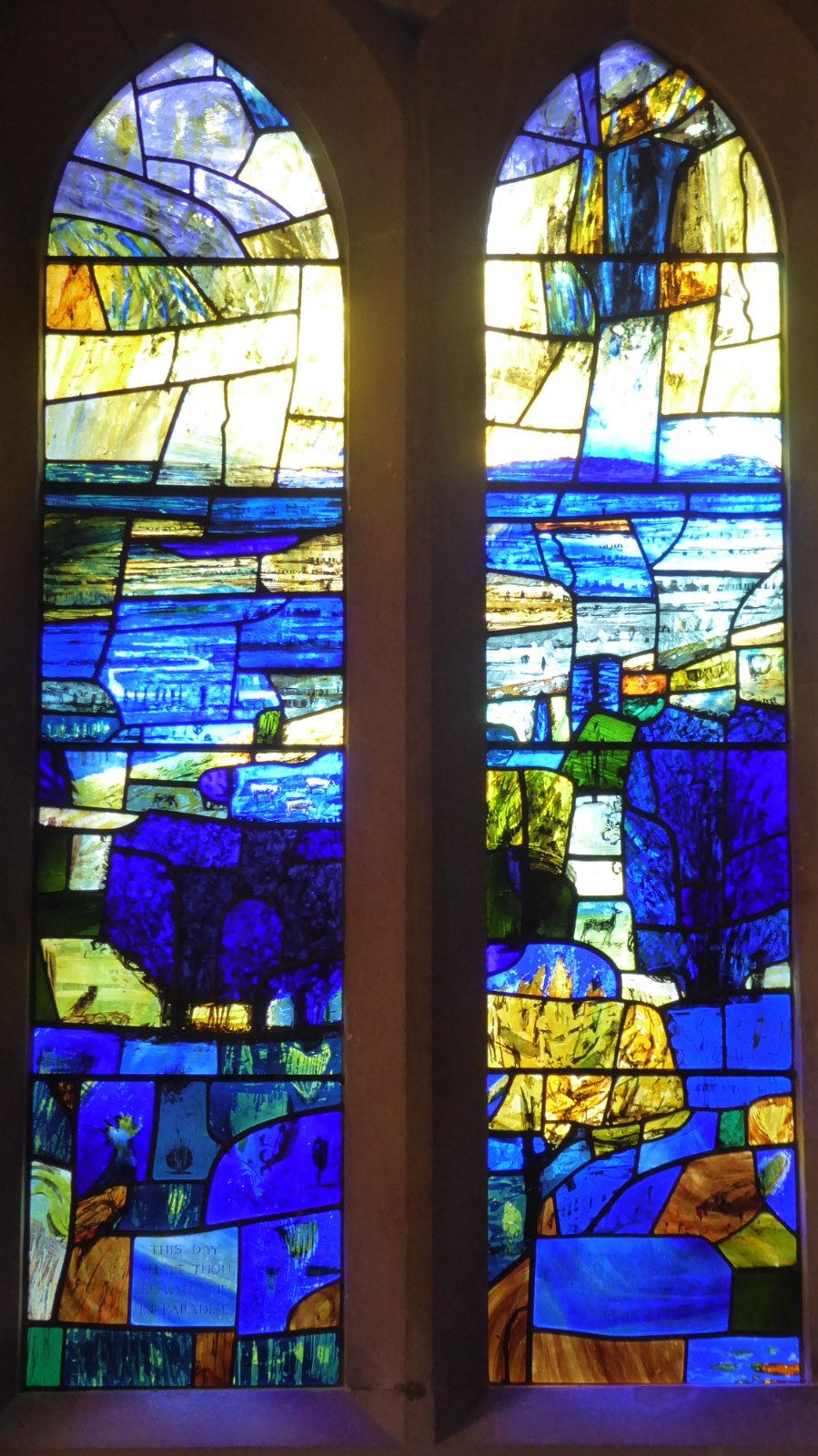
Paradise window (1986) - St Gabriel's Church, Hanley Swan

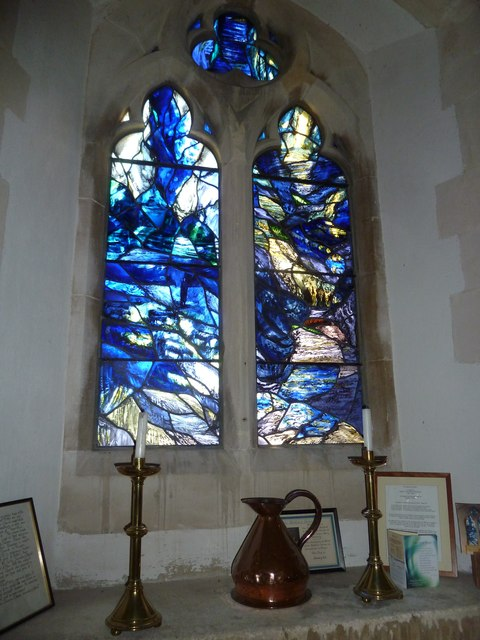
Two-light window with trefoil (1991) - St Mary's Church, Powerstock

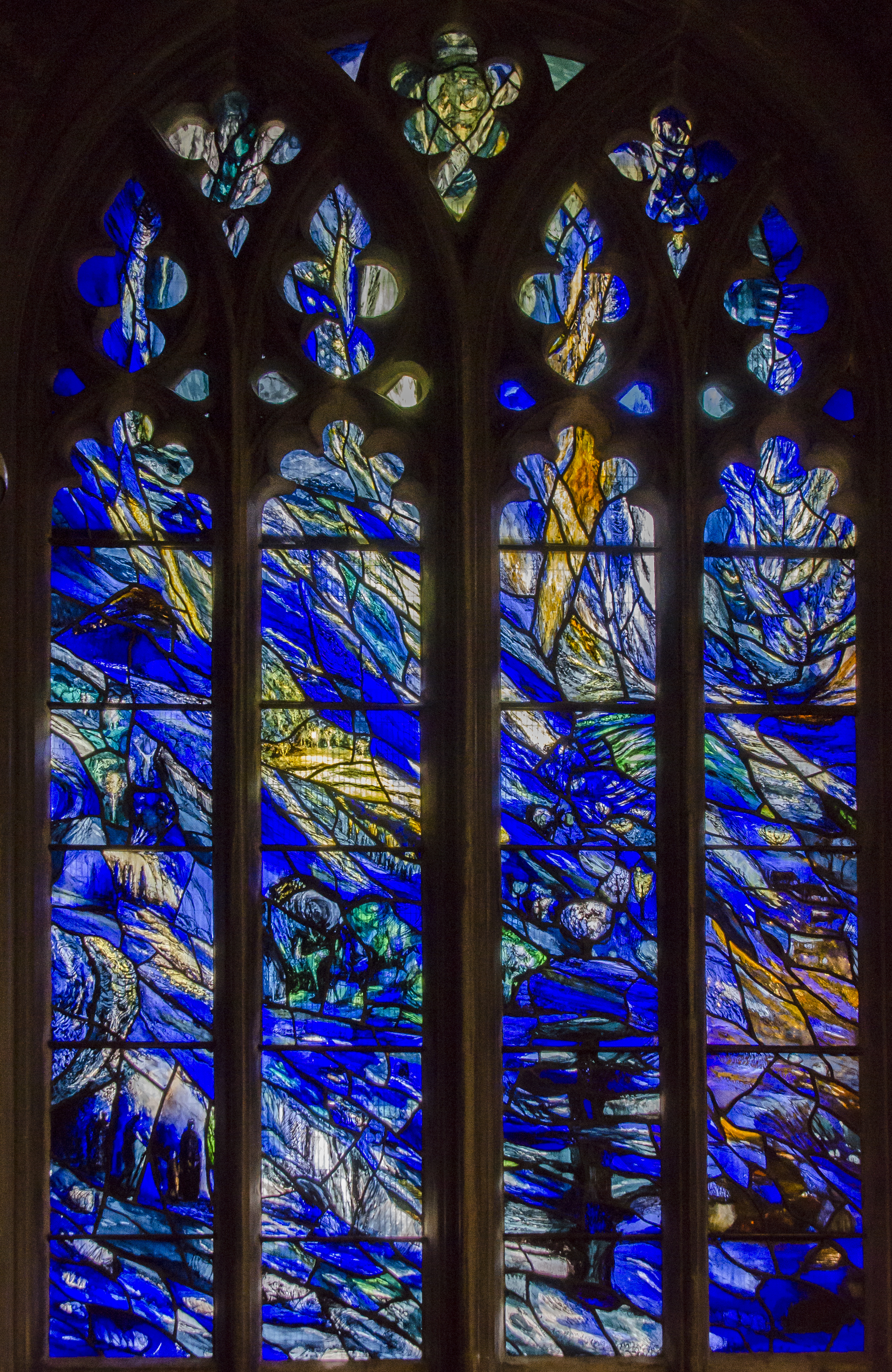
St Thomas Chapel windows, left (1992) - Gloucester Cathedral

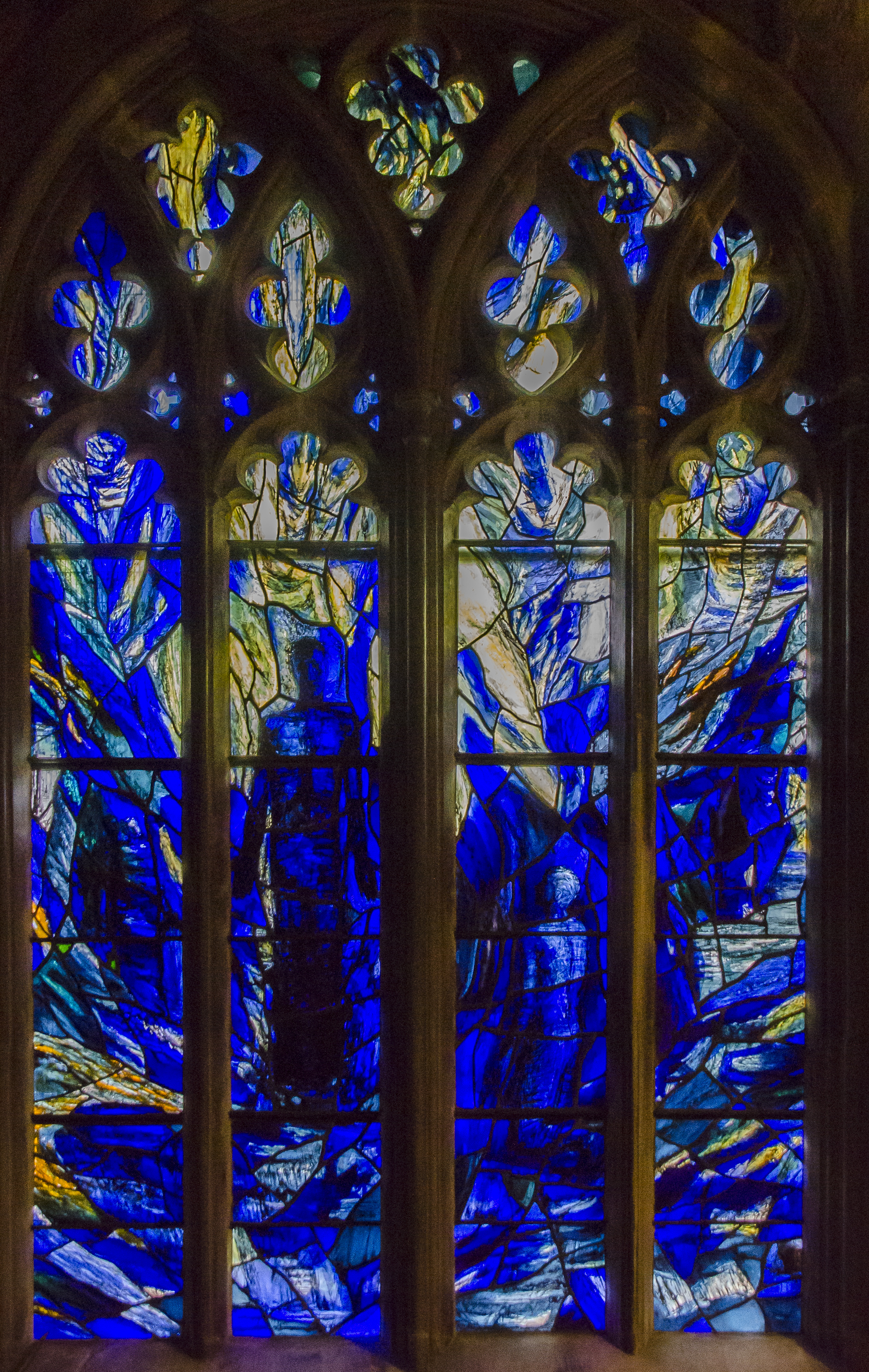
St Thomas Chapel windows, centre (1992) - Gloucester Cathedral

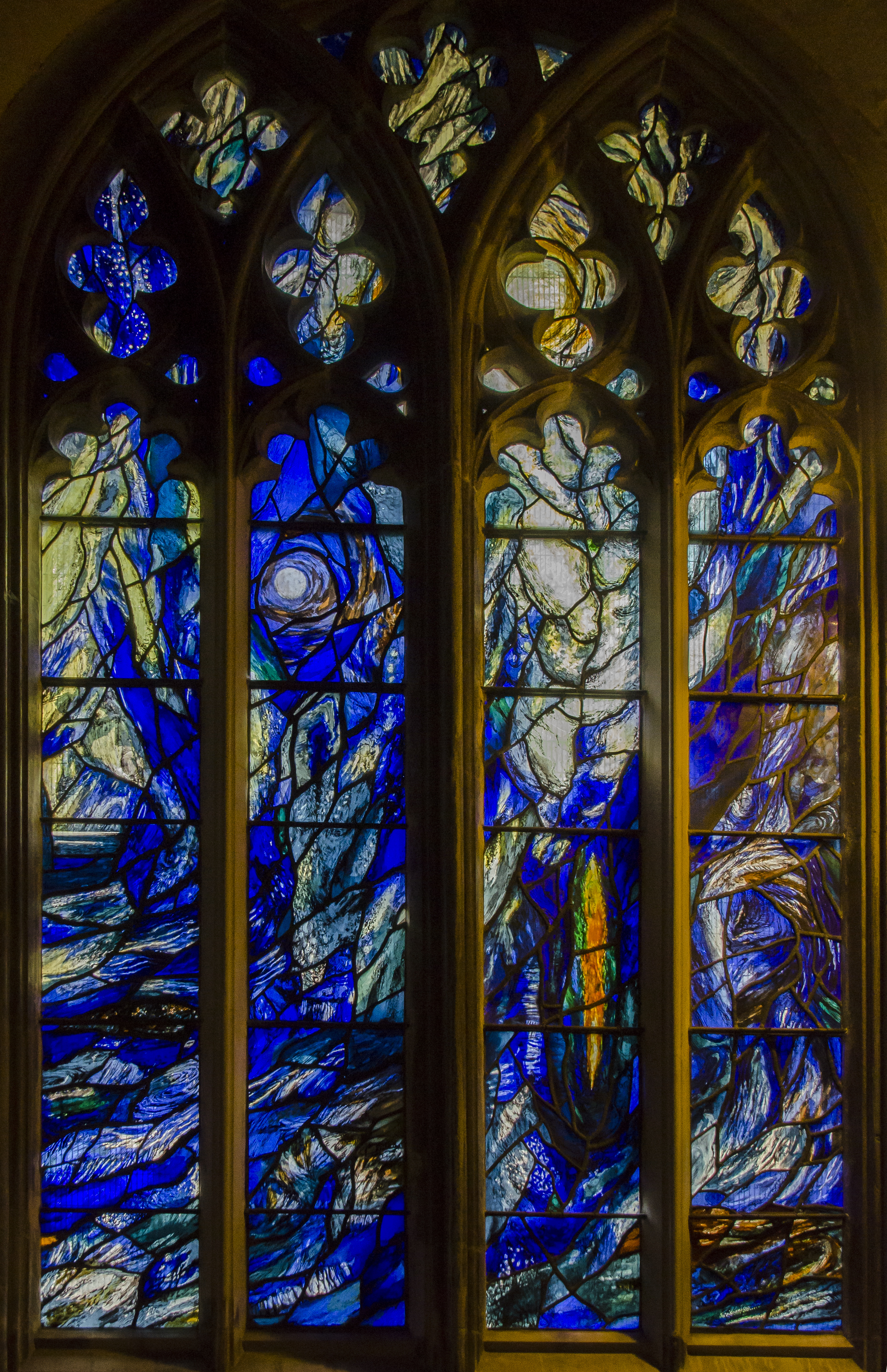
St Thomas Chapel windows, right (1992) - Gloucester Cathedral

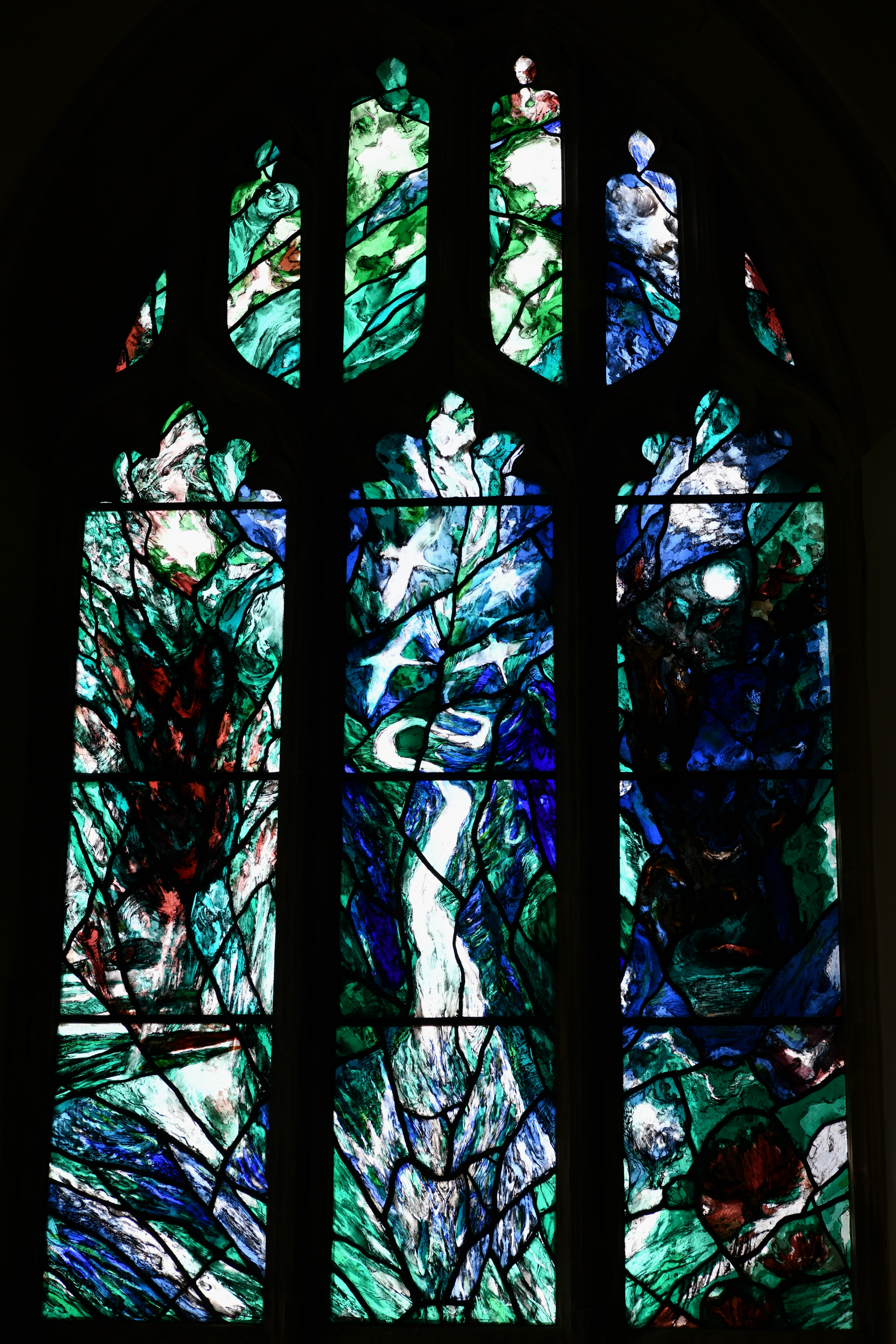
Sir Peter Scott memorial window (1993) - St John's Church, Slimbridge

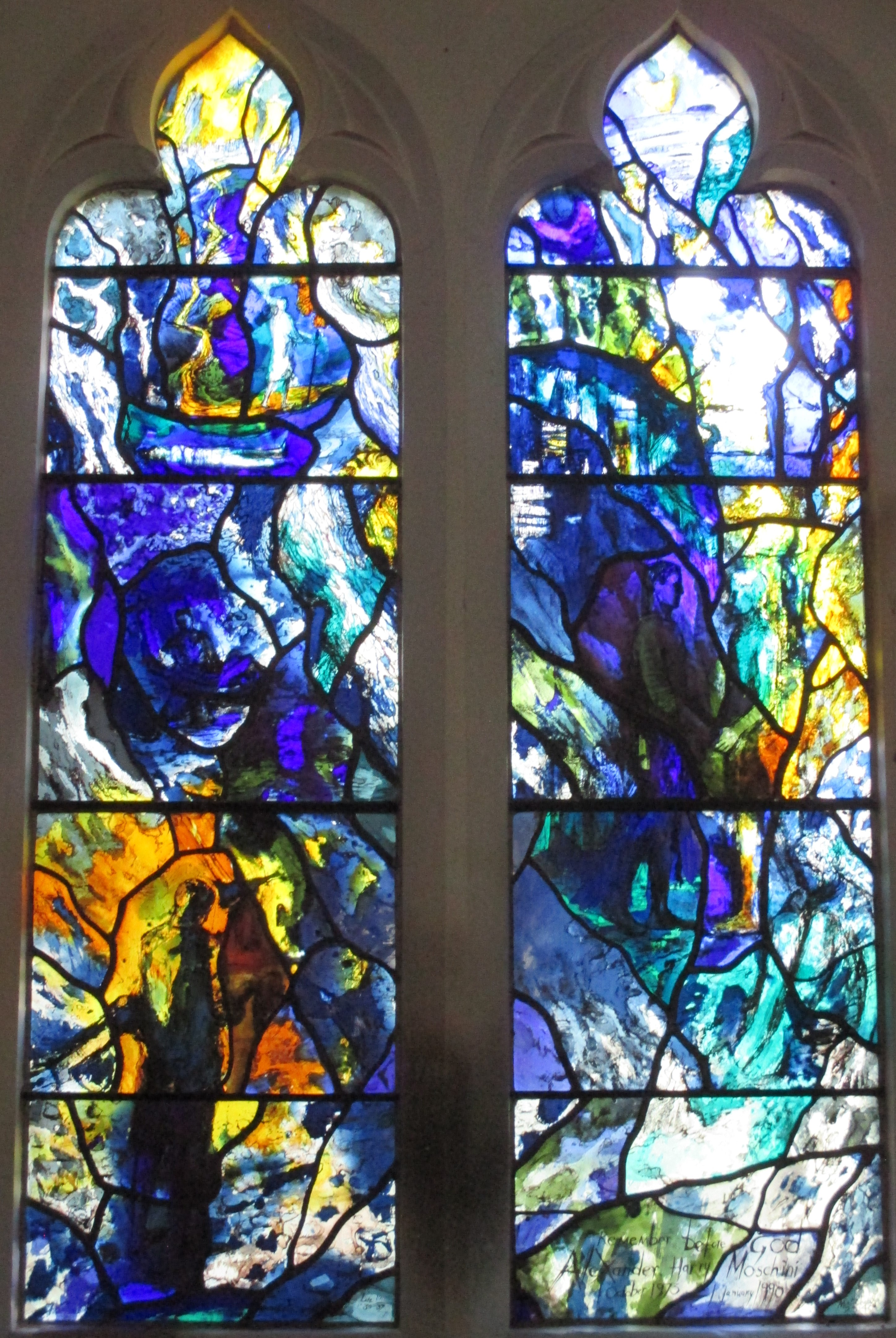
Alexander Moschini memorial window (1994) - St Andrew's Church, Nuthurst

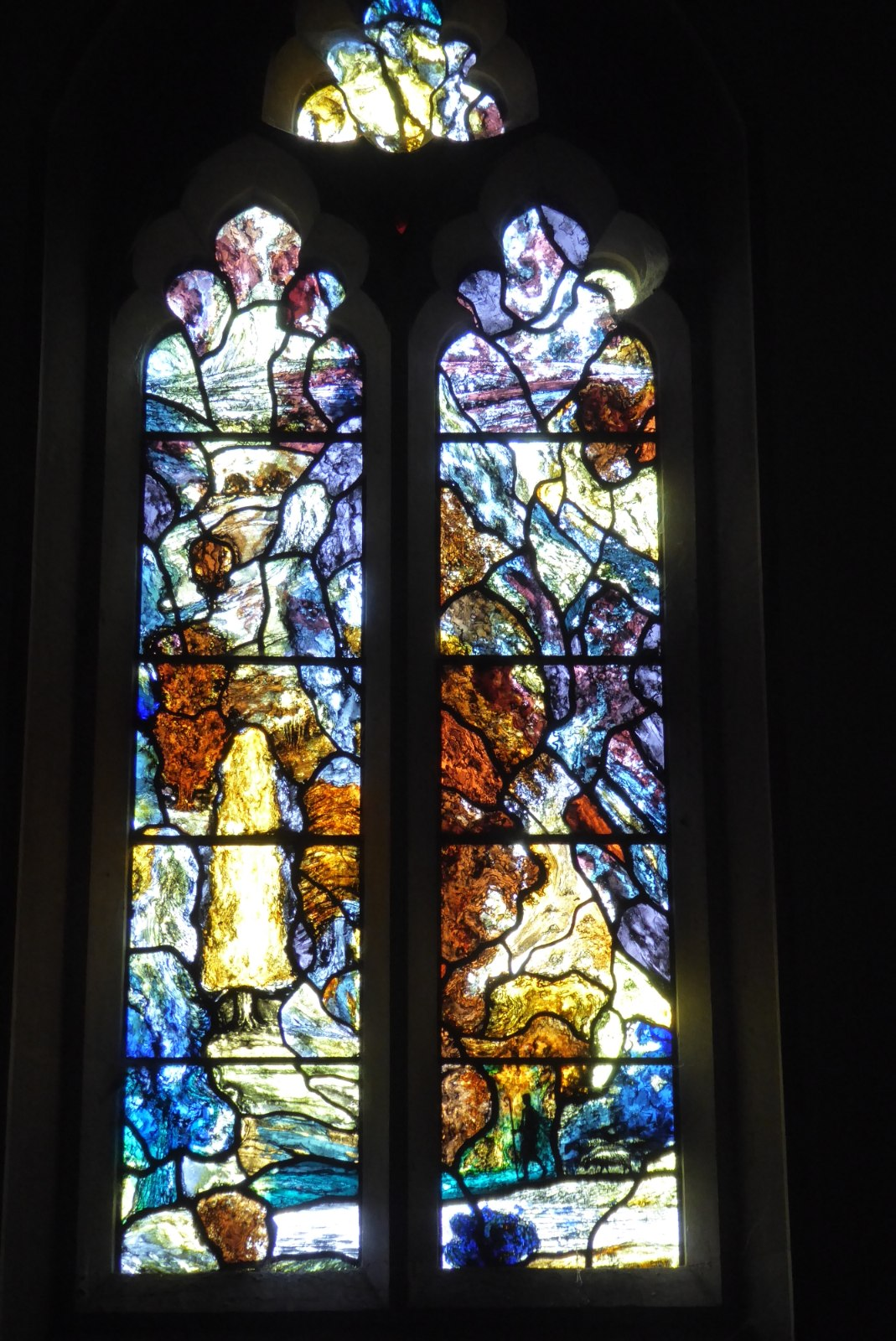
Major-General and Mrs F.V.B. Witts memorial window (1995) - St Peter's Church, Upper Slaughter

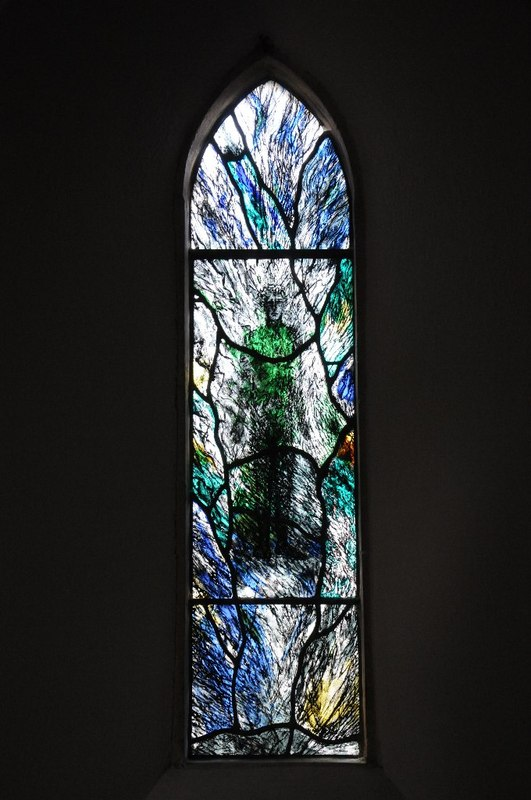
Four Evangelists, four elements window - Angel of St Matthew with Water (1997) - St Osmund's Church, Tarlton, Gloucestershire

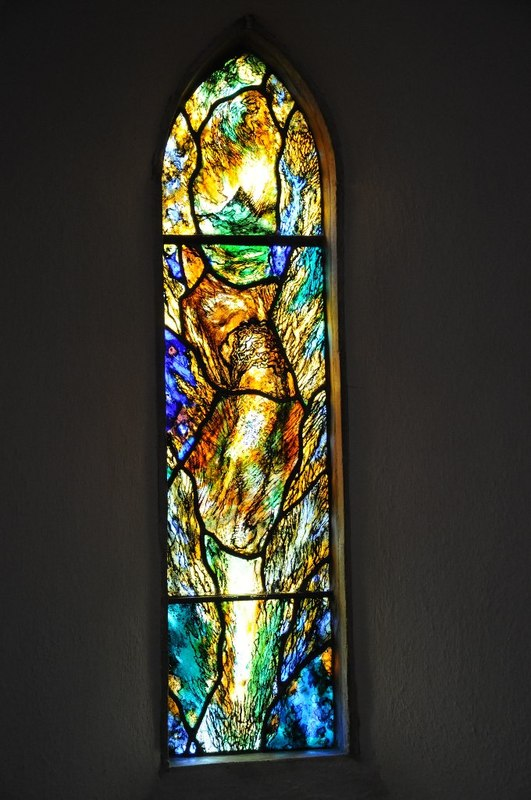
Four Evangelists, four elements window - Lion of St Mark with Fire (1997) - St Osmund's Church, Tarlton, Gloucestershire

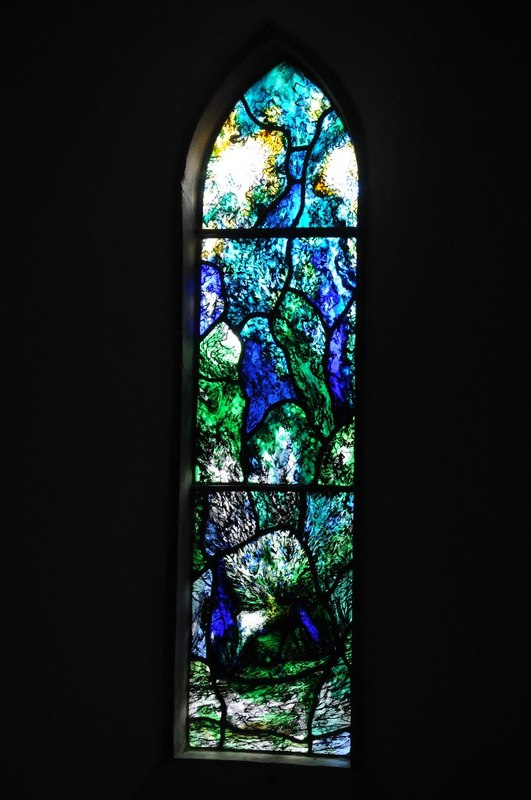
Four Evangelists, four elements window - Ox of St Luke with Earth (1997) - St Osmund's Church, Tarlton, Gloucestershire

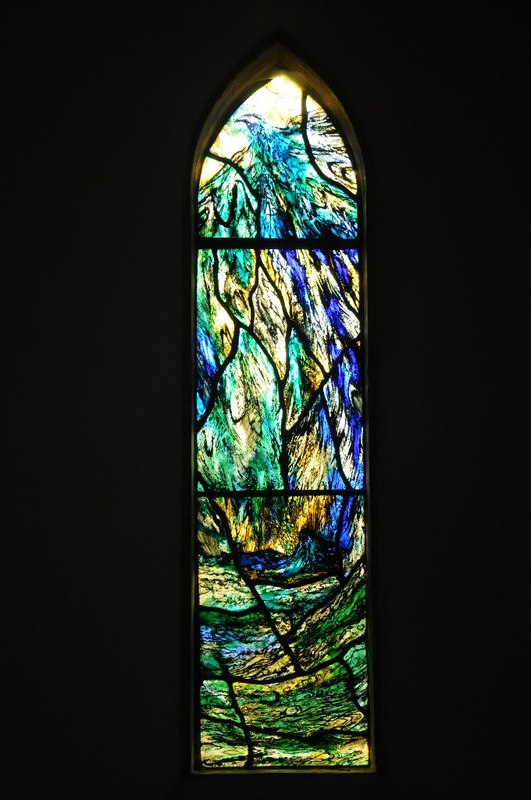
Four Evangelists, four elements window - Eagle of St John with Air (1997) - St Osmund's Church, Tarlton, Gloucestershire

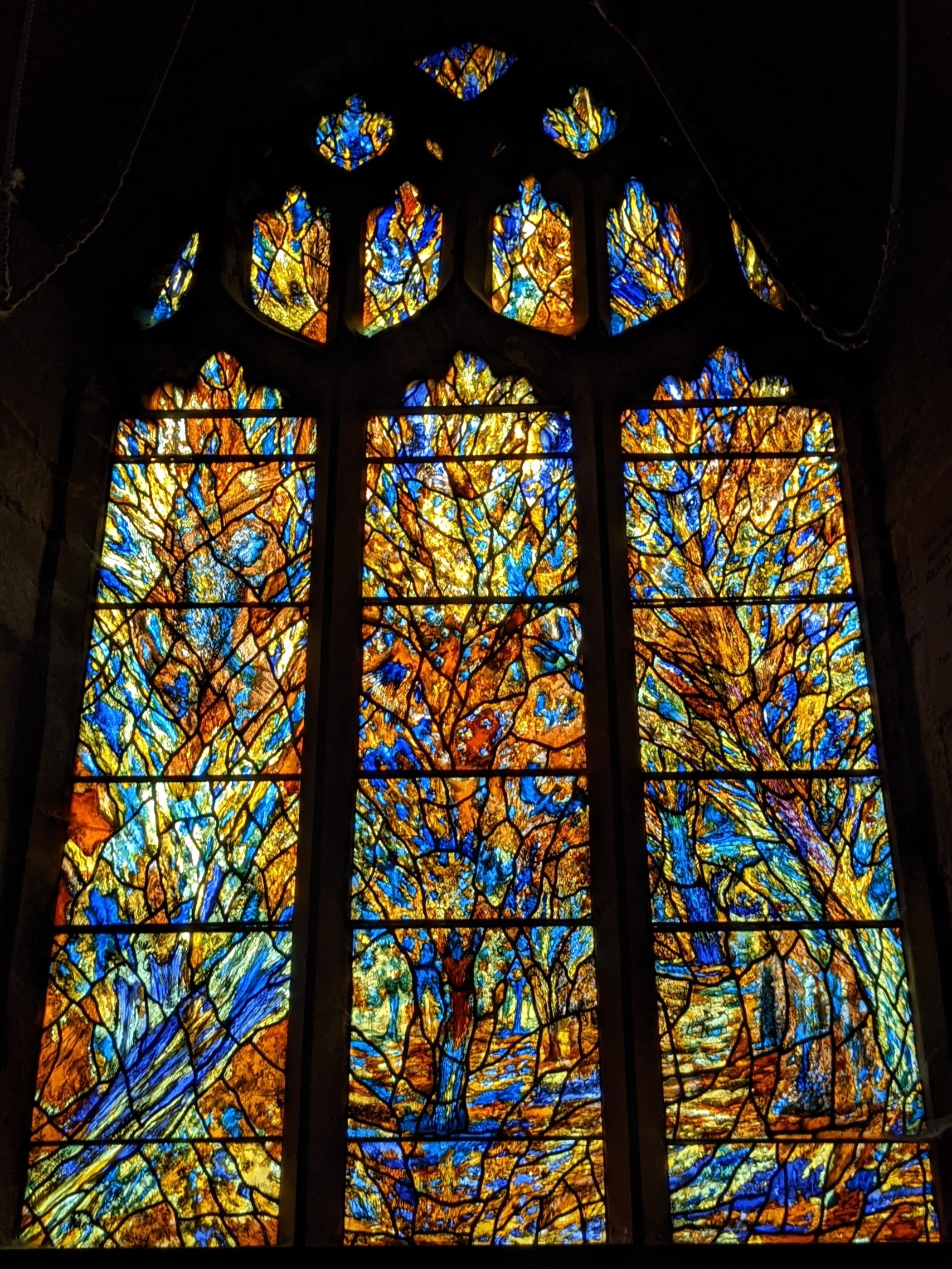
Millennium window (1999) - St Peter's Church, Martley

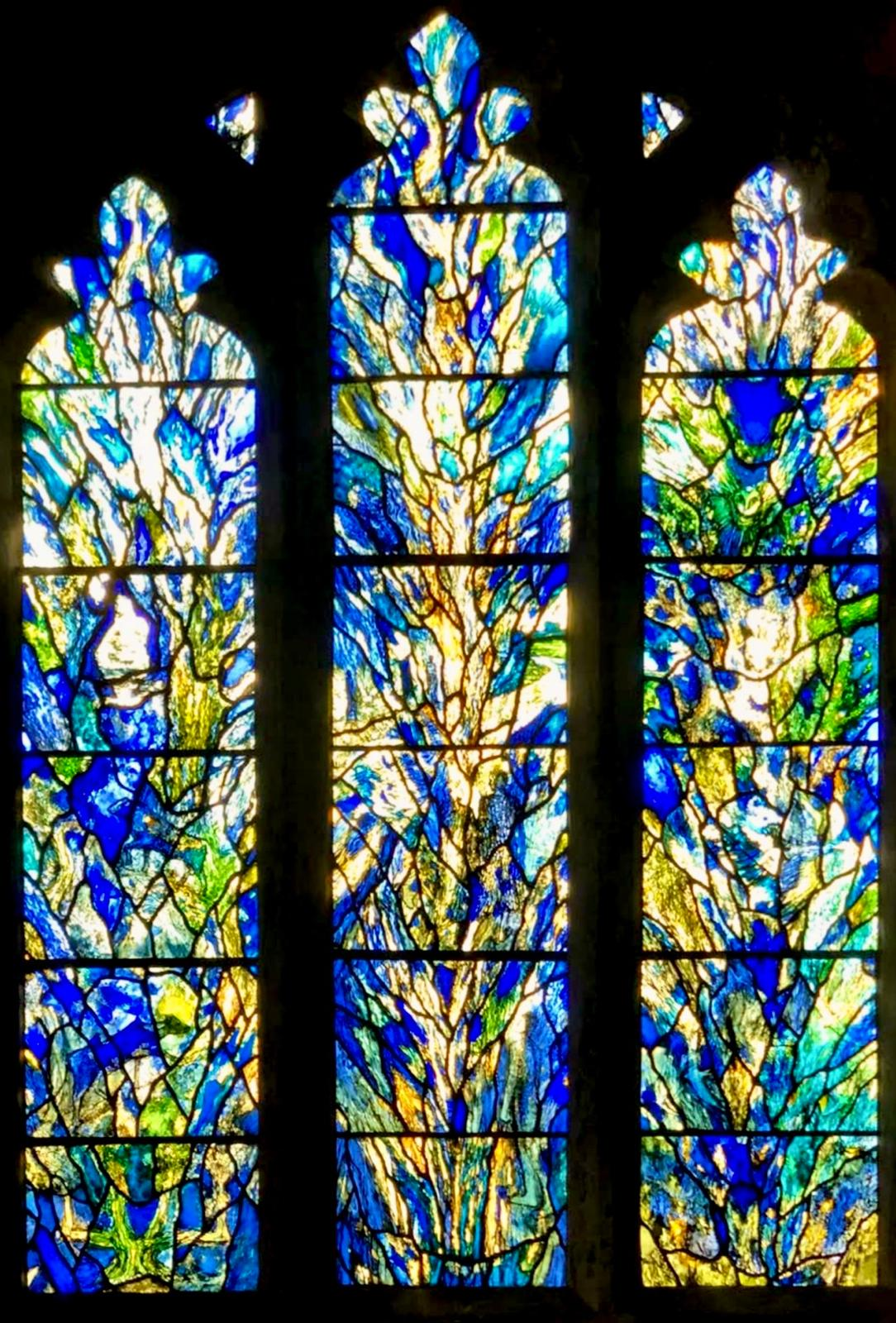
Millennium window (2000) - All Saints' Church, Bolton Percy

Millennium window (2001) - St Mary's Church, Tarrant Hinton

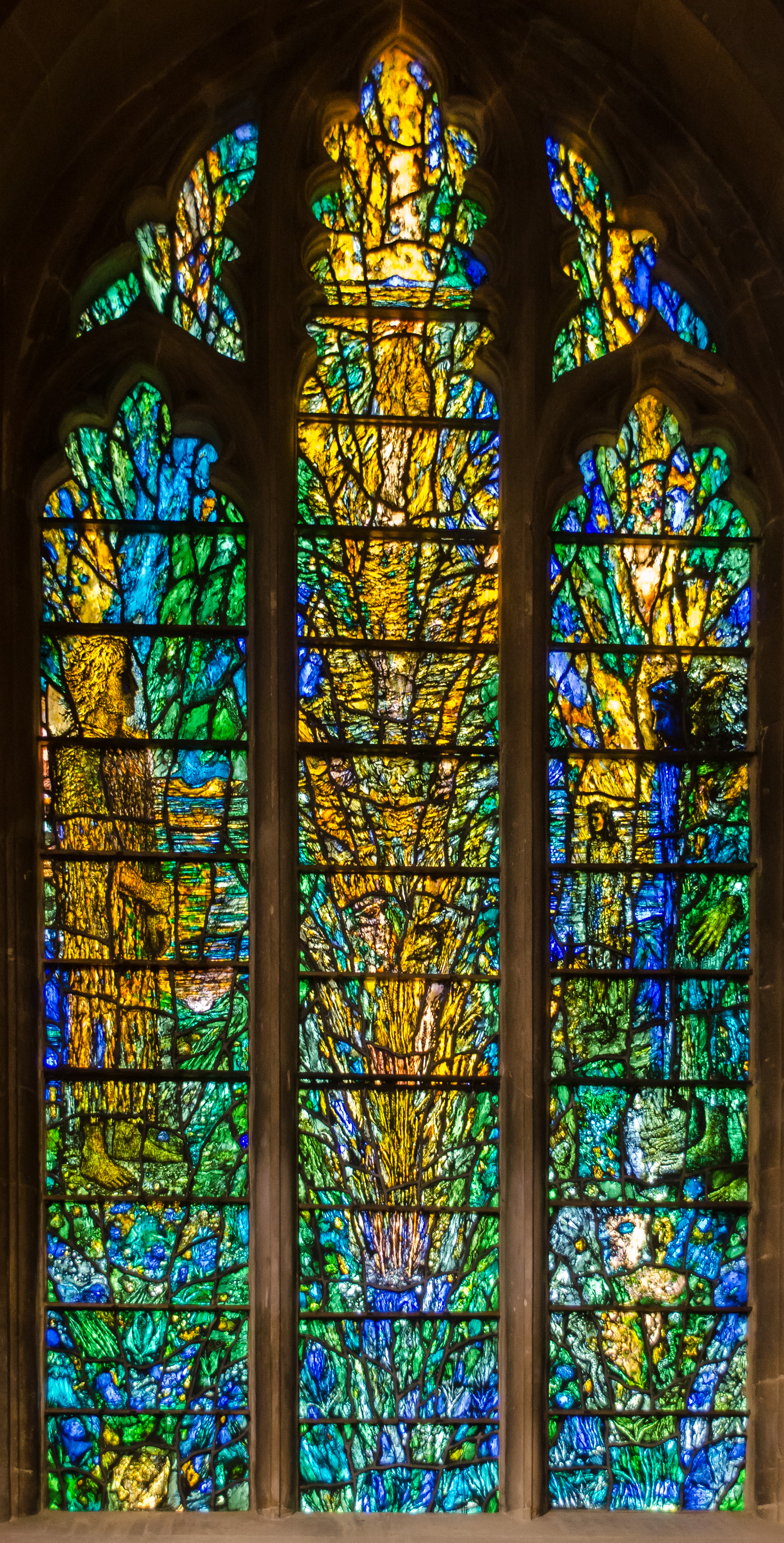
900th anniversary windows 'Prayer' (2002) - Tewkesbury Abbey

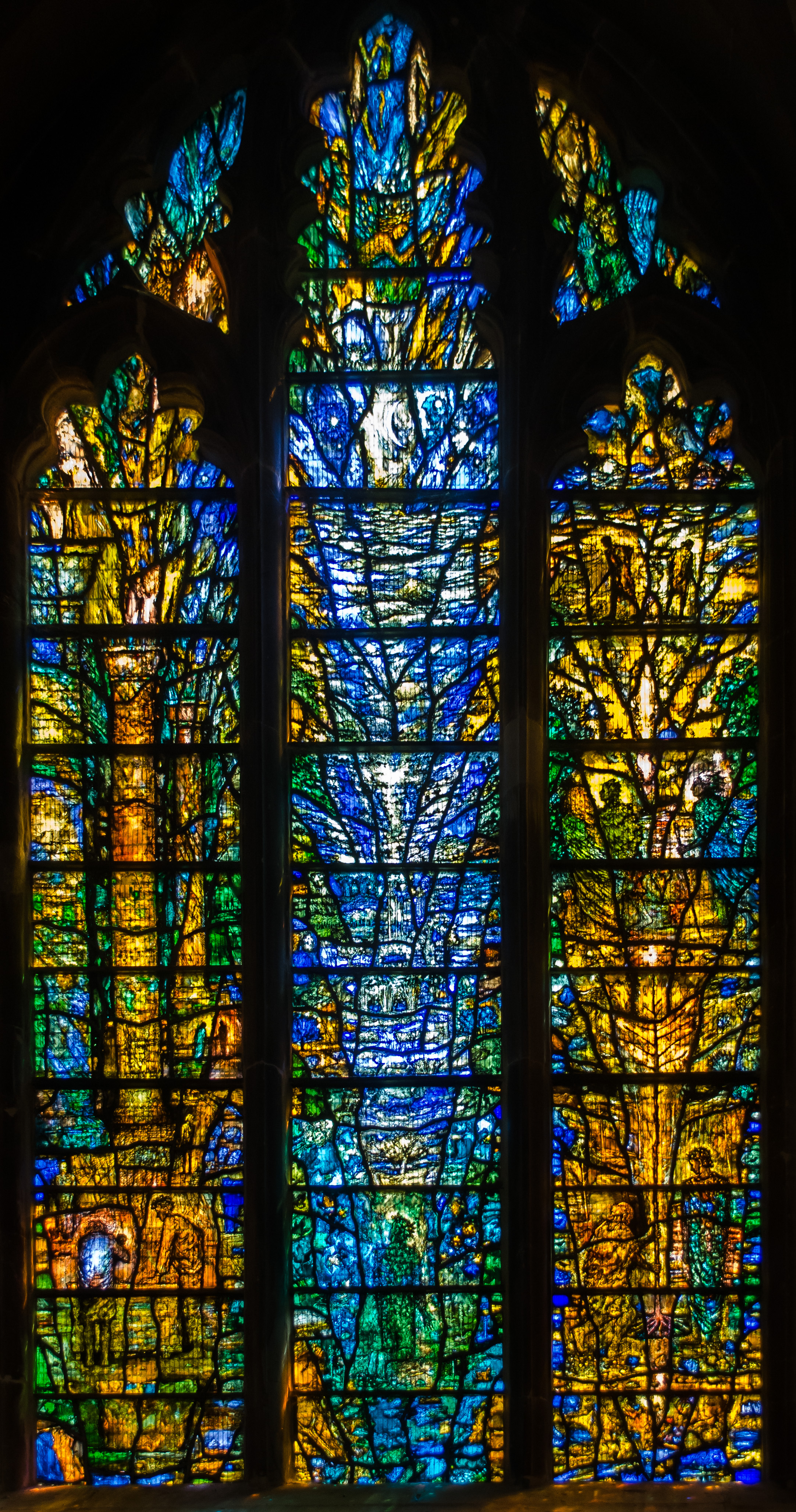
900th anniversary windows 'Work' (2002) - Tewkesbury Abbey

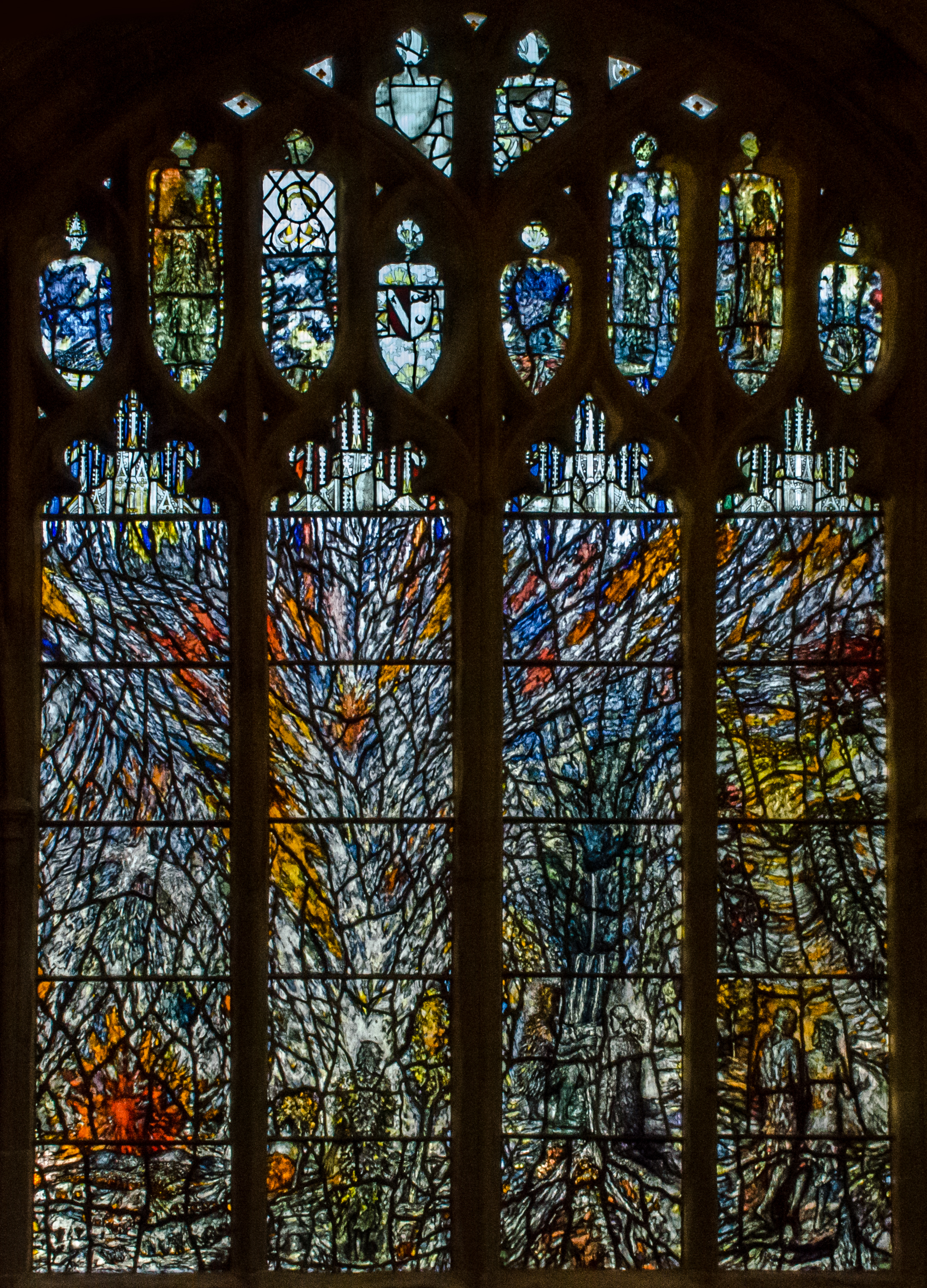
Millennium windows, west (2003) - Great Malvern Priory

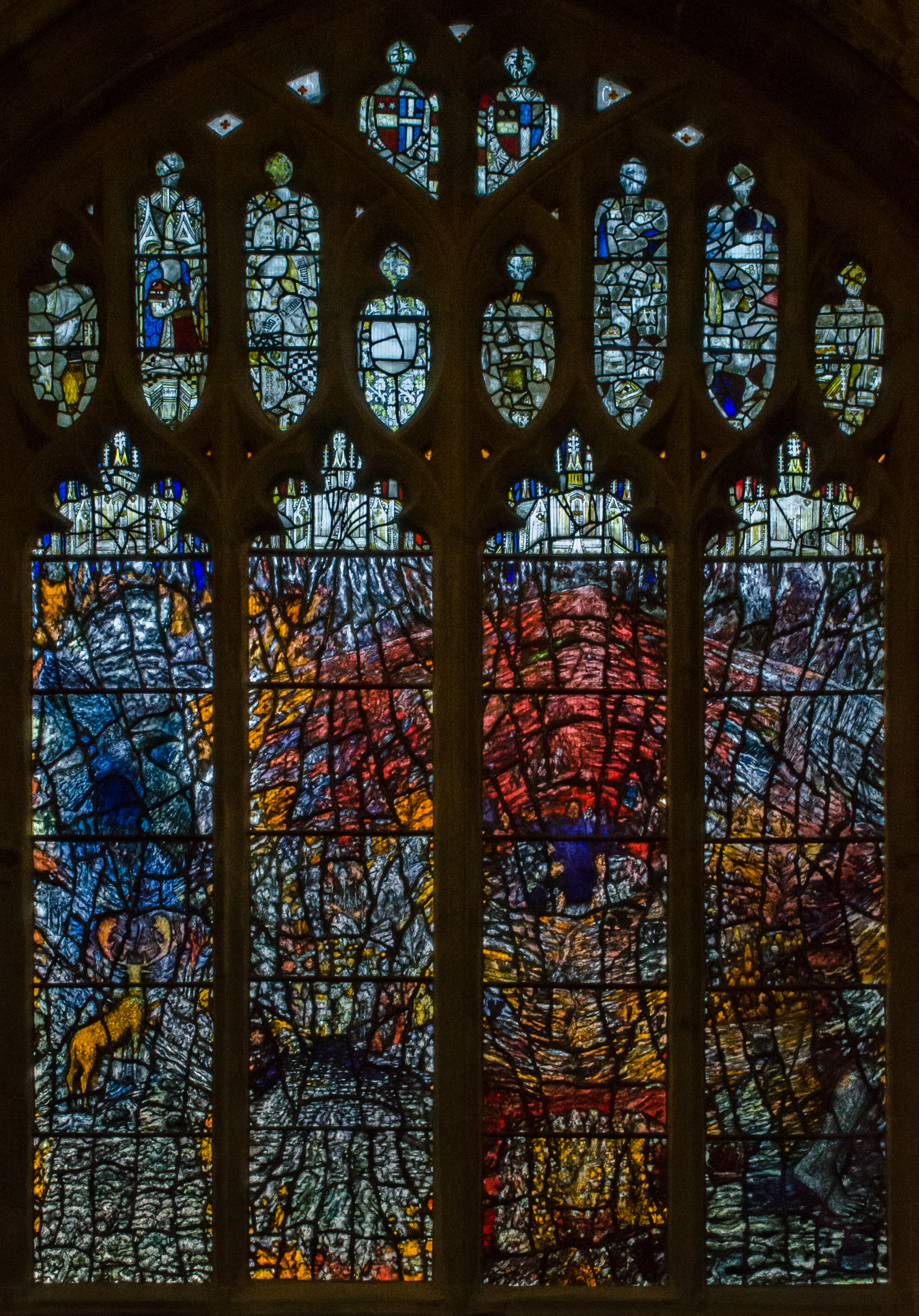
Millennium windows, east (2003) - Great Malvern Priory

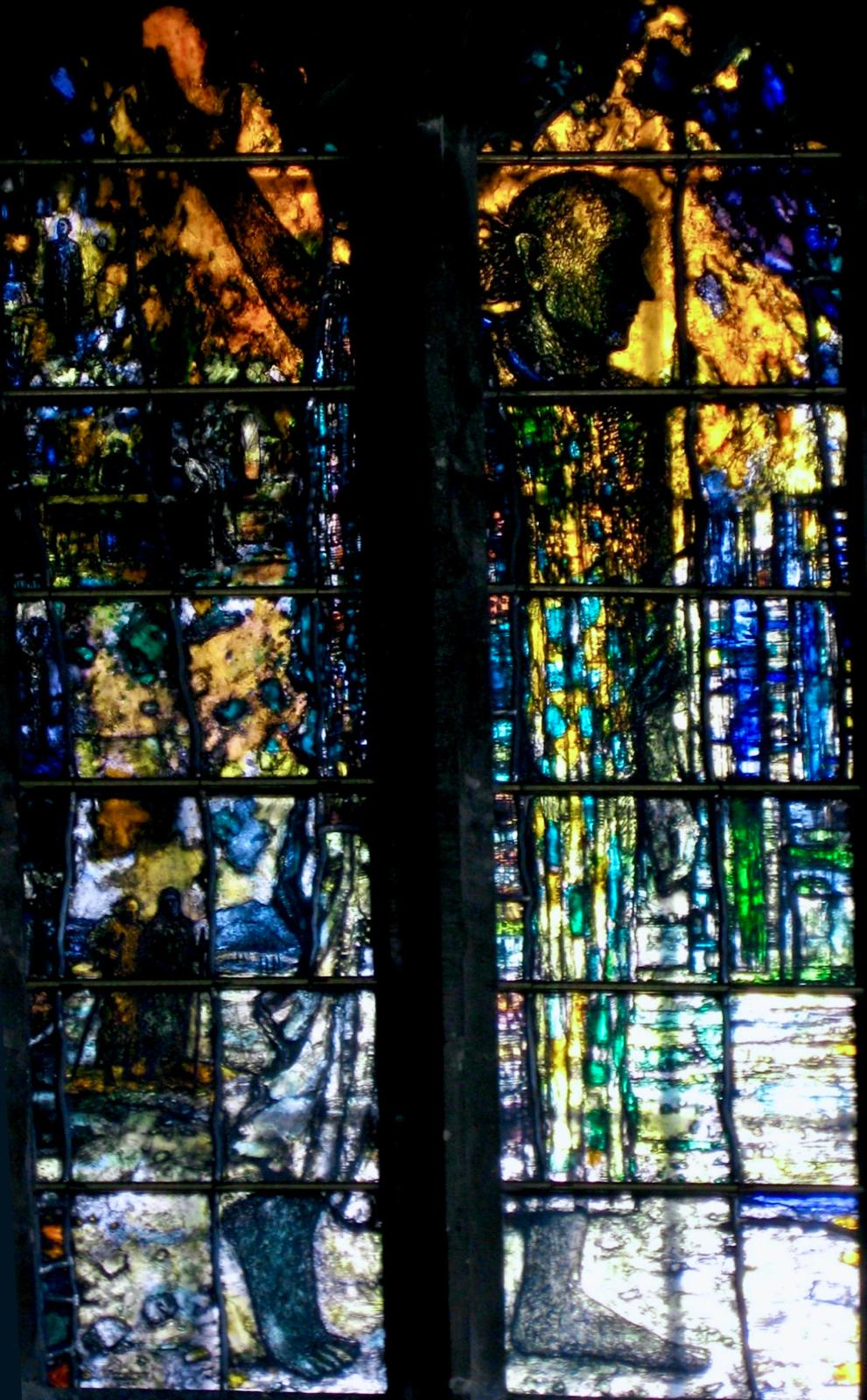
Prayer in the life of St Bede and St Benedict Biscop, north window (2006) - Sunderland Minster

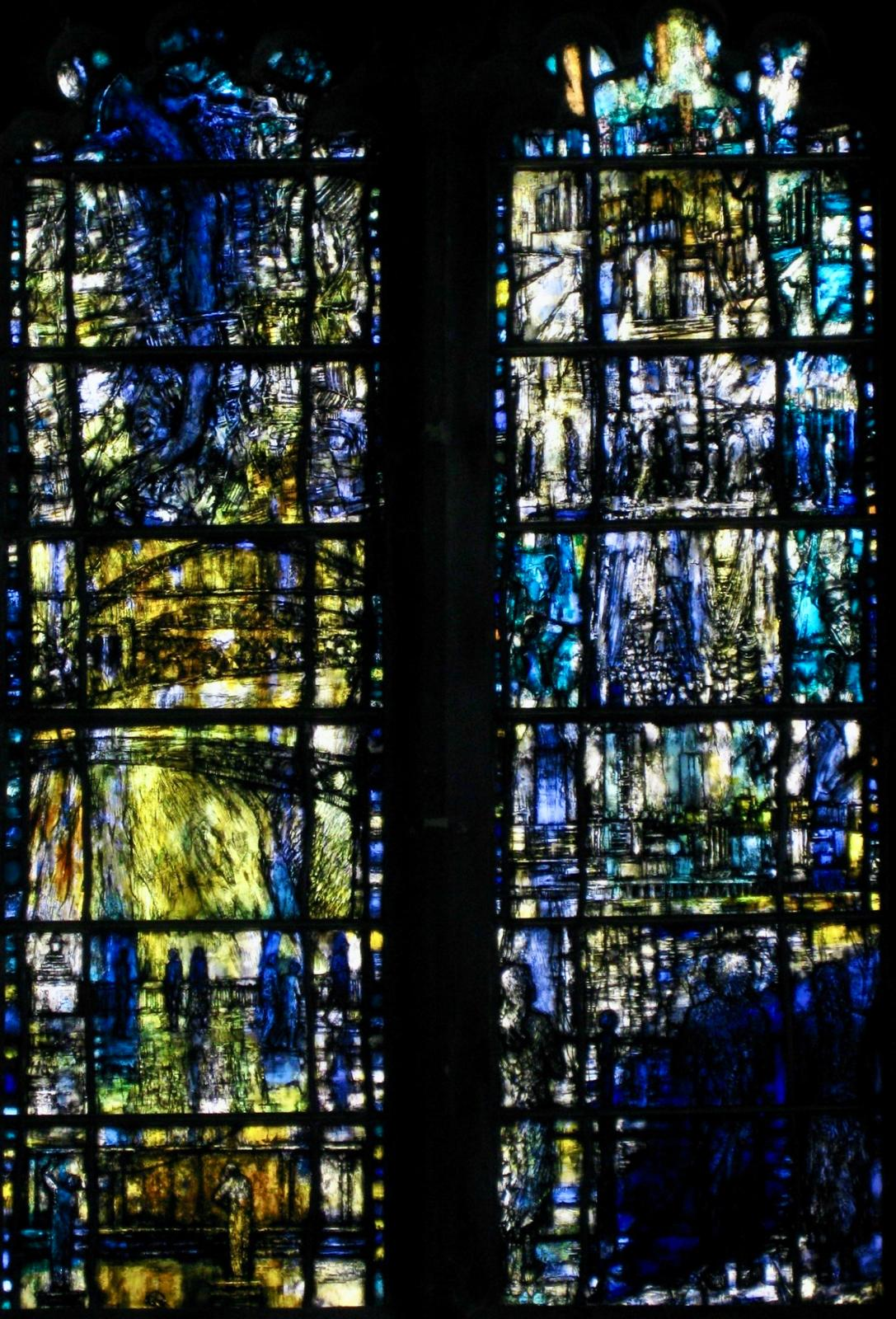
Prayer in the life of St Bede and St Benedict Biscop, centre window (2006) - Sunderland Minster

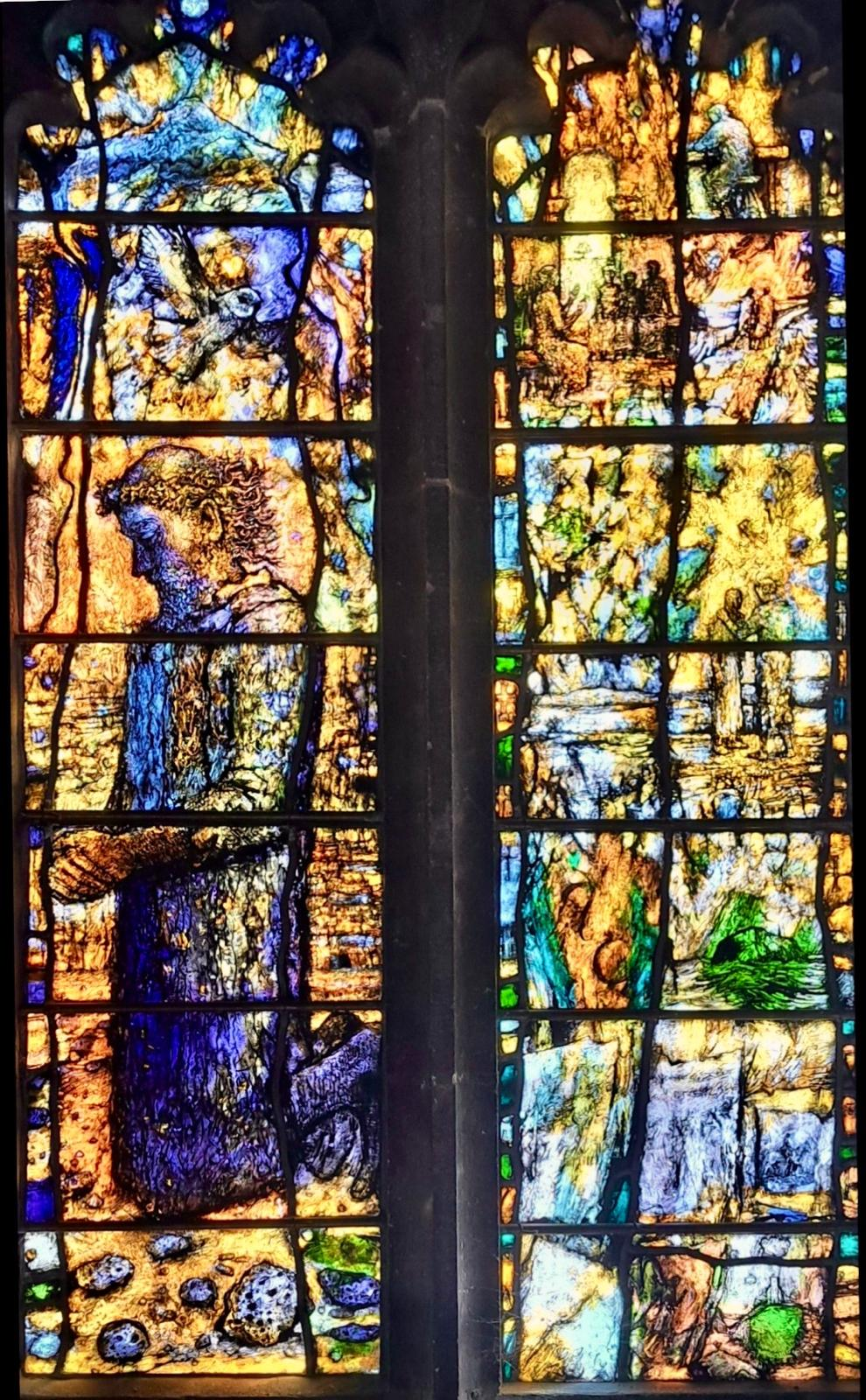
Prayer in the life of St Bede and St Benedict Biscop, south window (2006) - Sunderland Minster

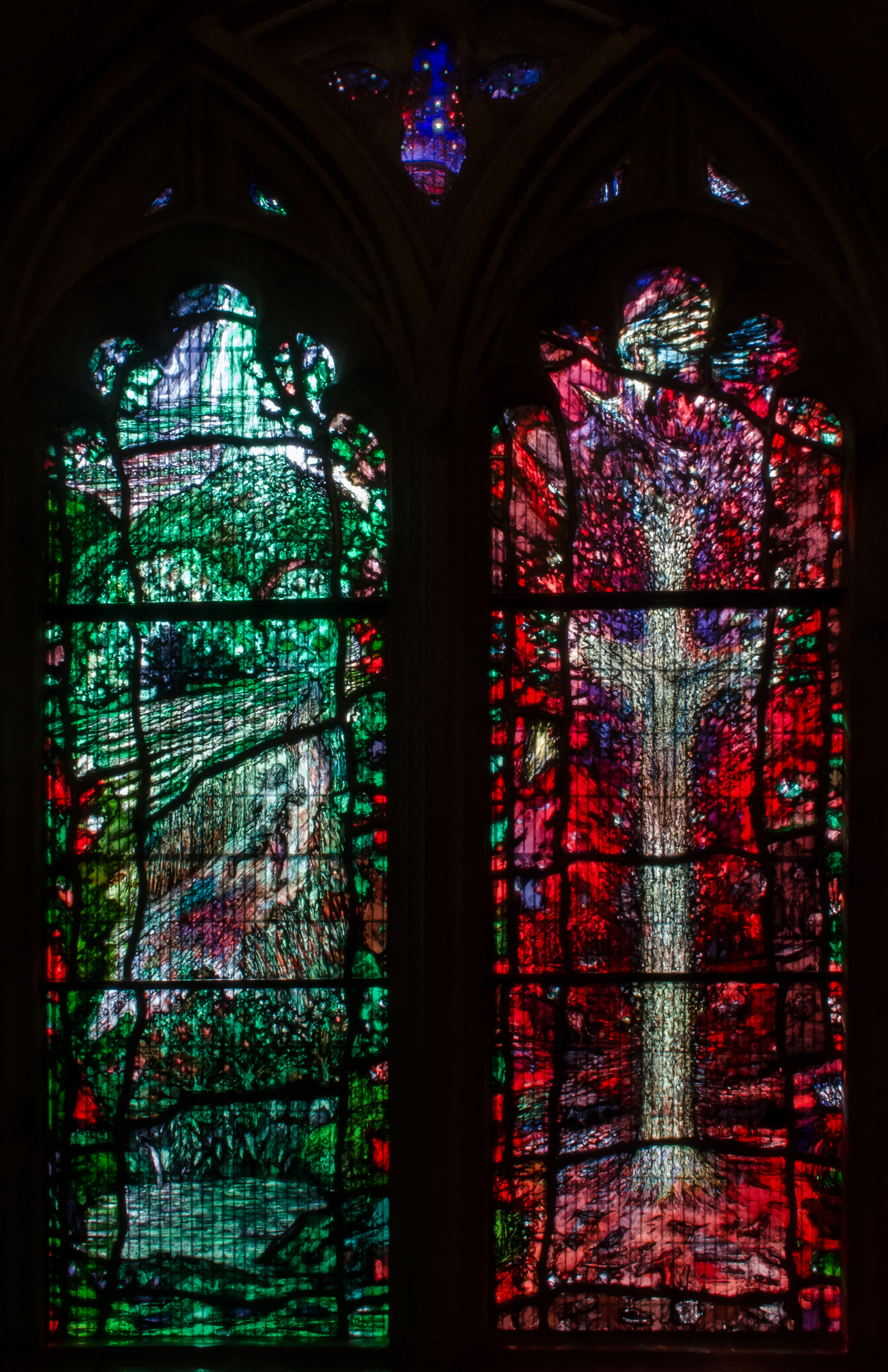
Thomas Traherne windows, left (2007) - Hereford Cathedral

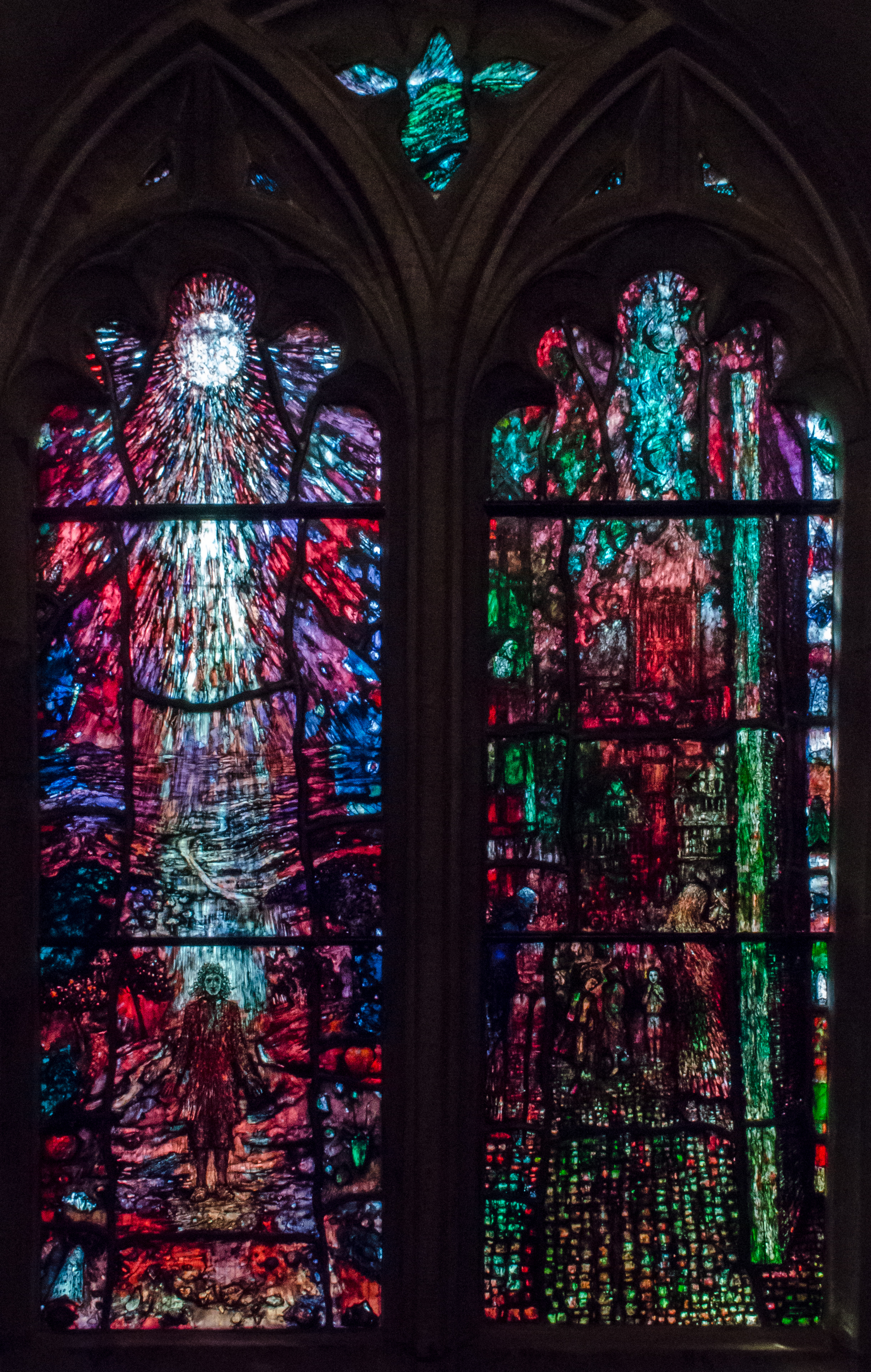
Thomas Traherne windows, right (2007) - Hereford Cathedral

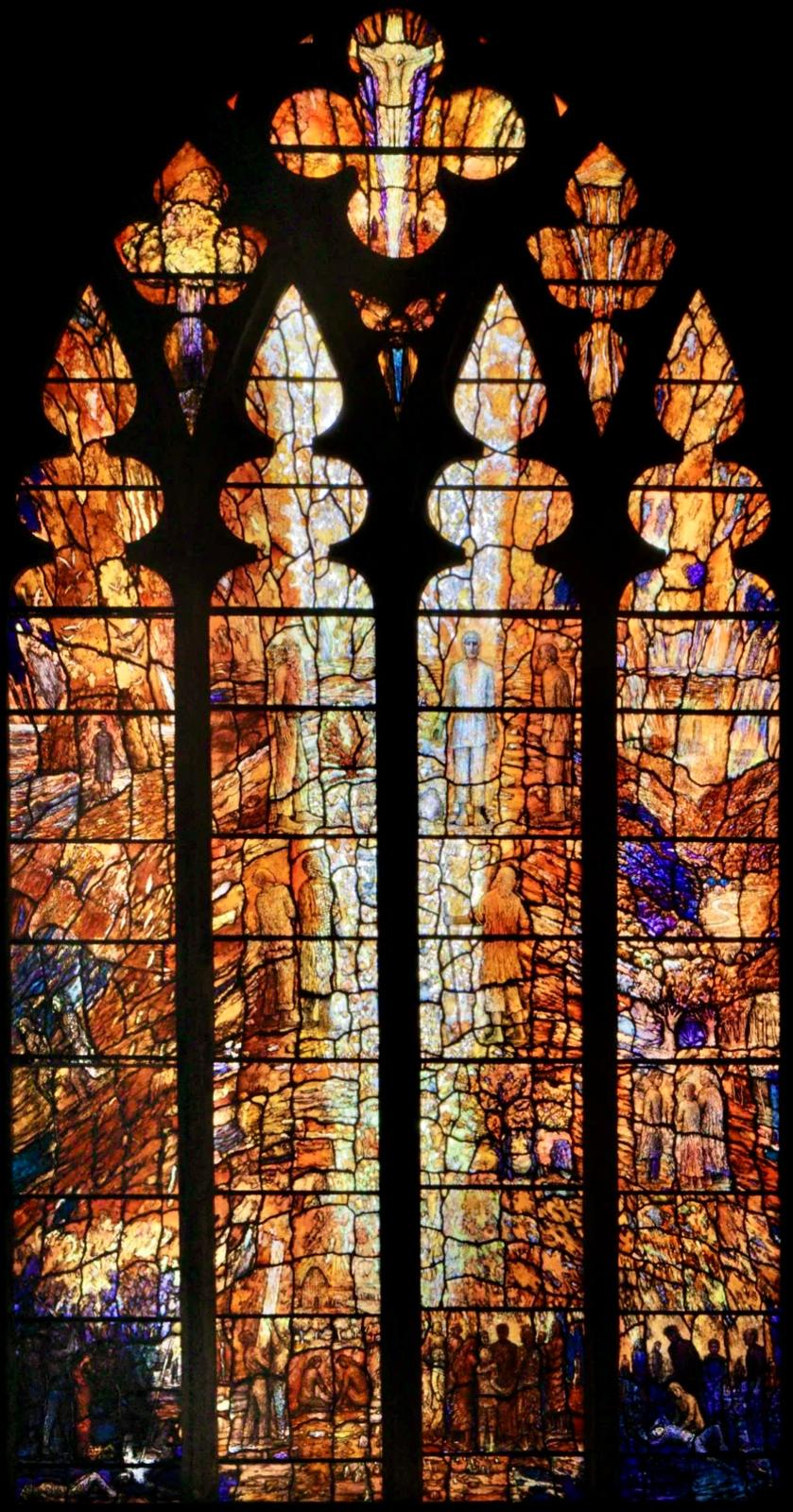
Transfiguration window (2010) - Durham Cathedral

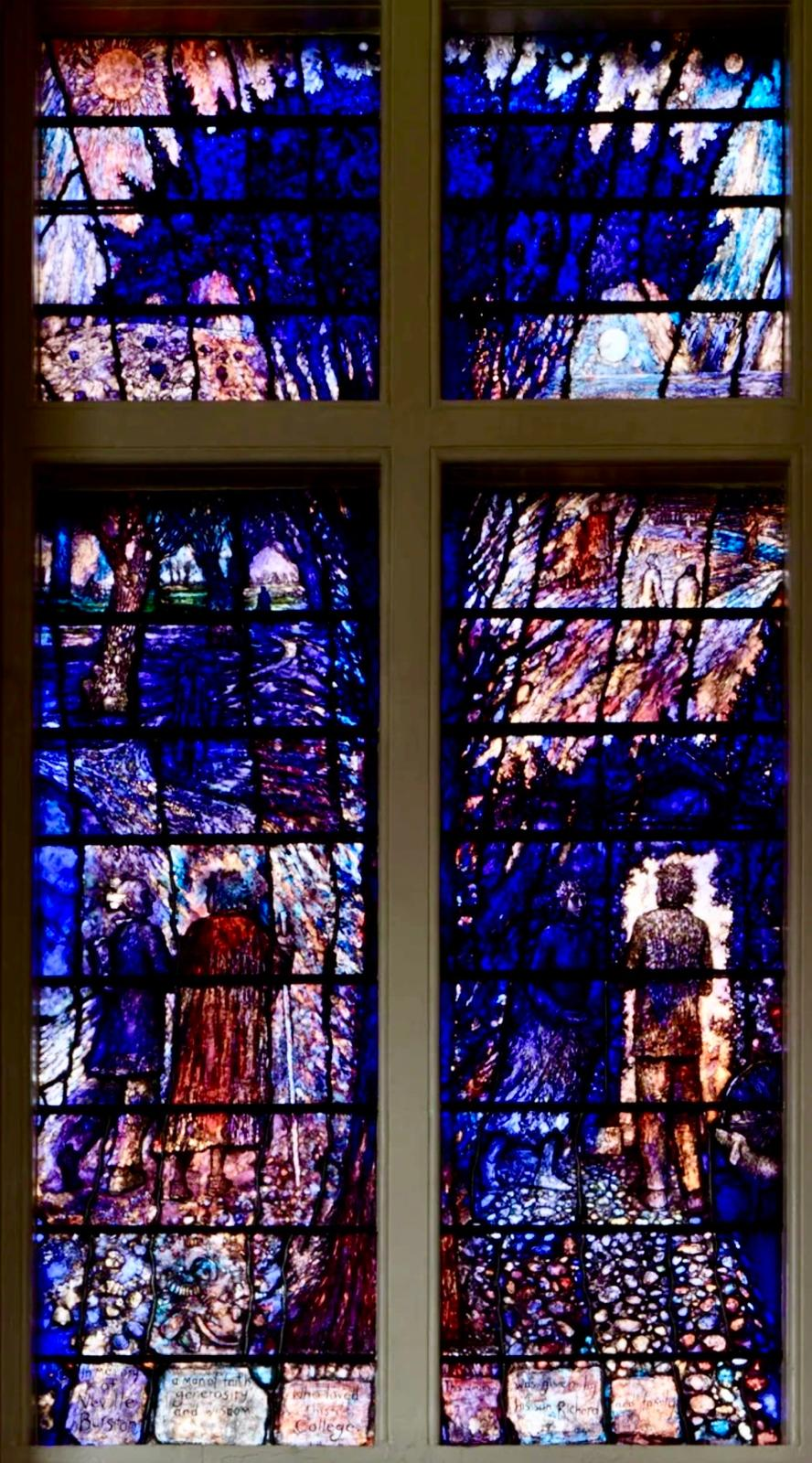
Wisdom window (2012) - Chapel of St Catherine's College, Cambridge

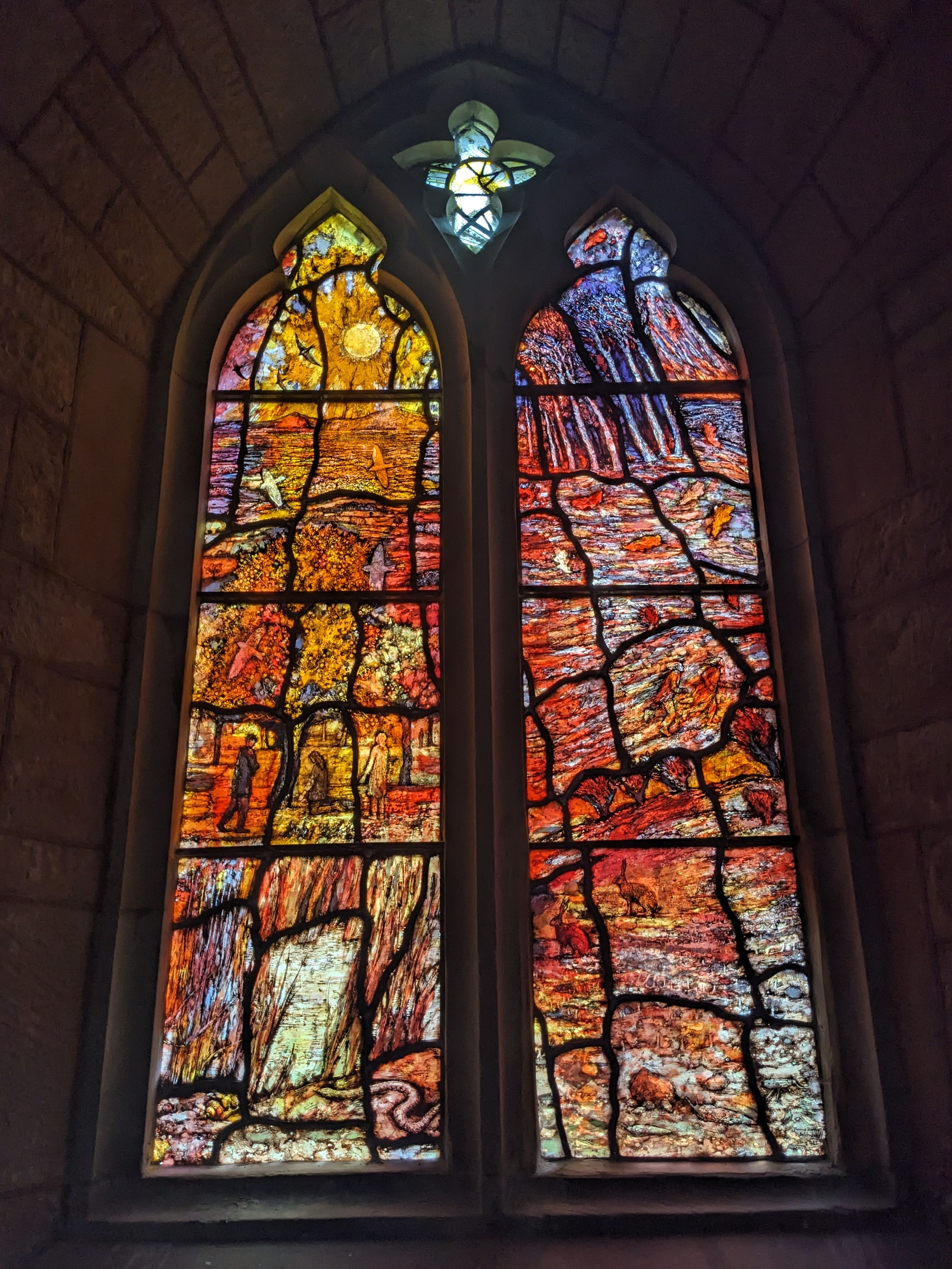
Creation window (2012) - St Edburga’s Church, Leigh

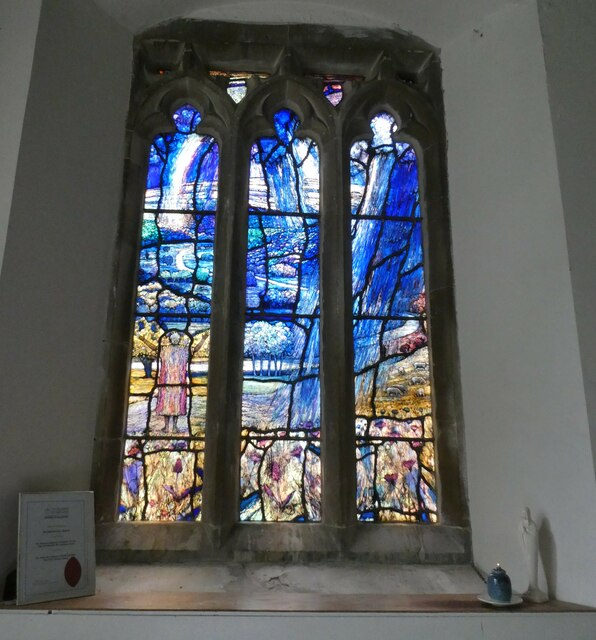
Anne and David Rasch memorial window (2013) - All Saints Church, Middle Woodford

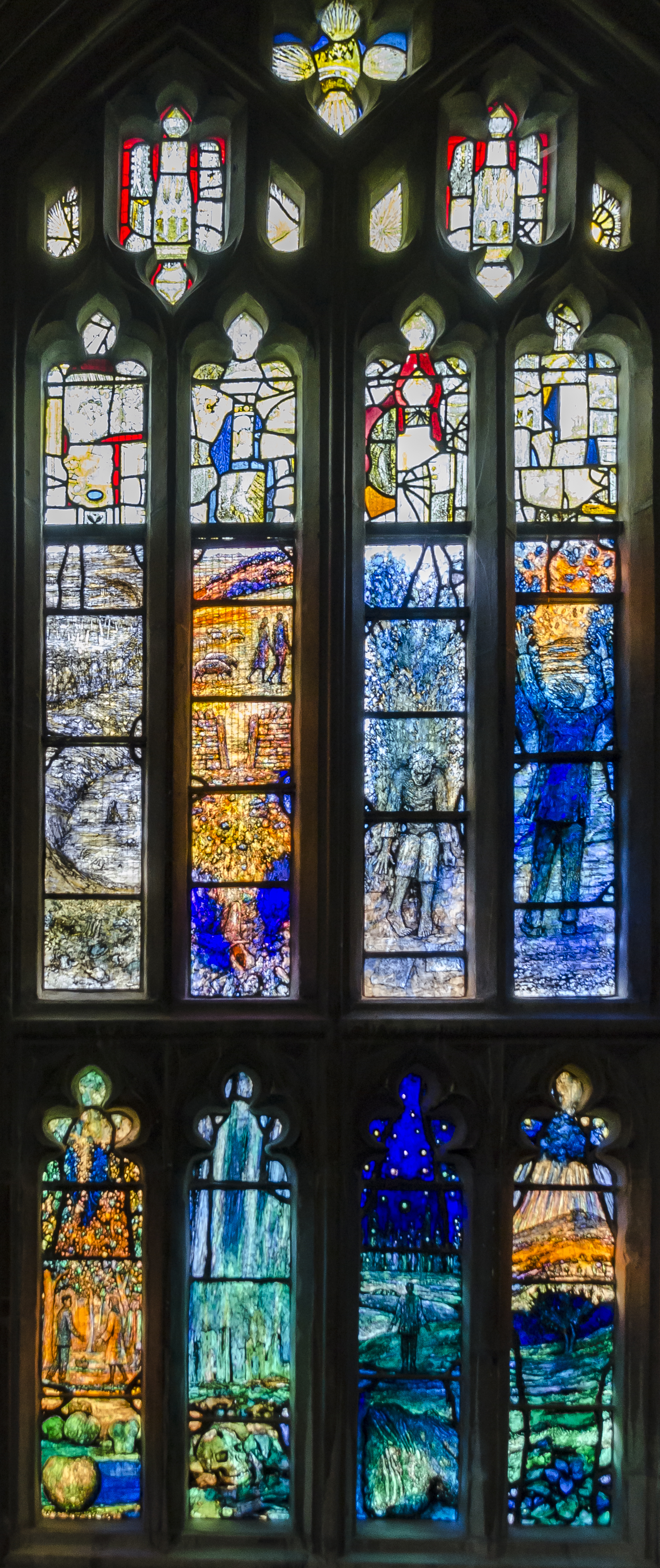
Ivor Gurney memorial window (2014) - Gloucester Cathedral

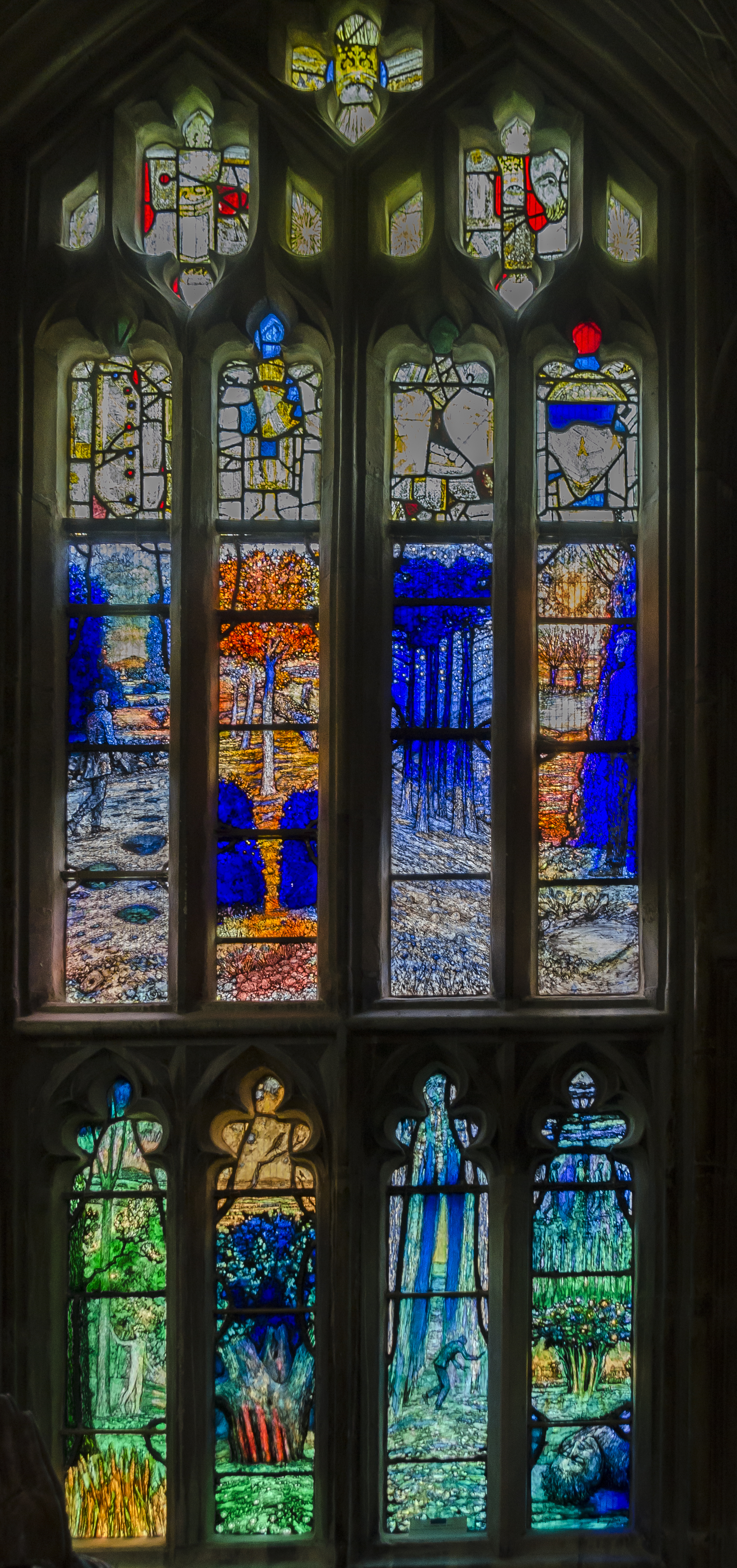
Gerald Finzi memorial window (2016) - Gloucester Cathedral

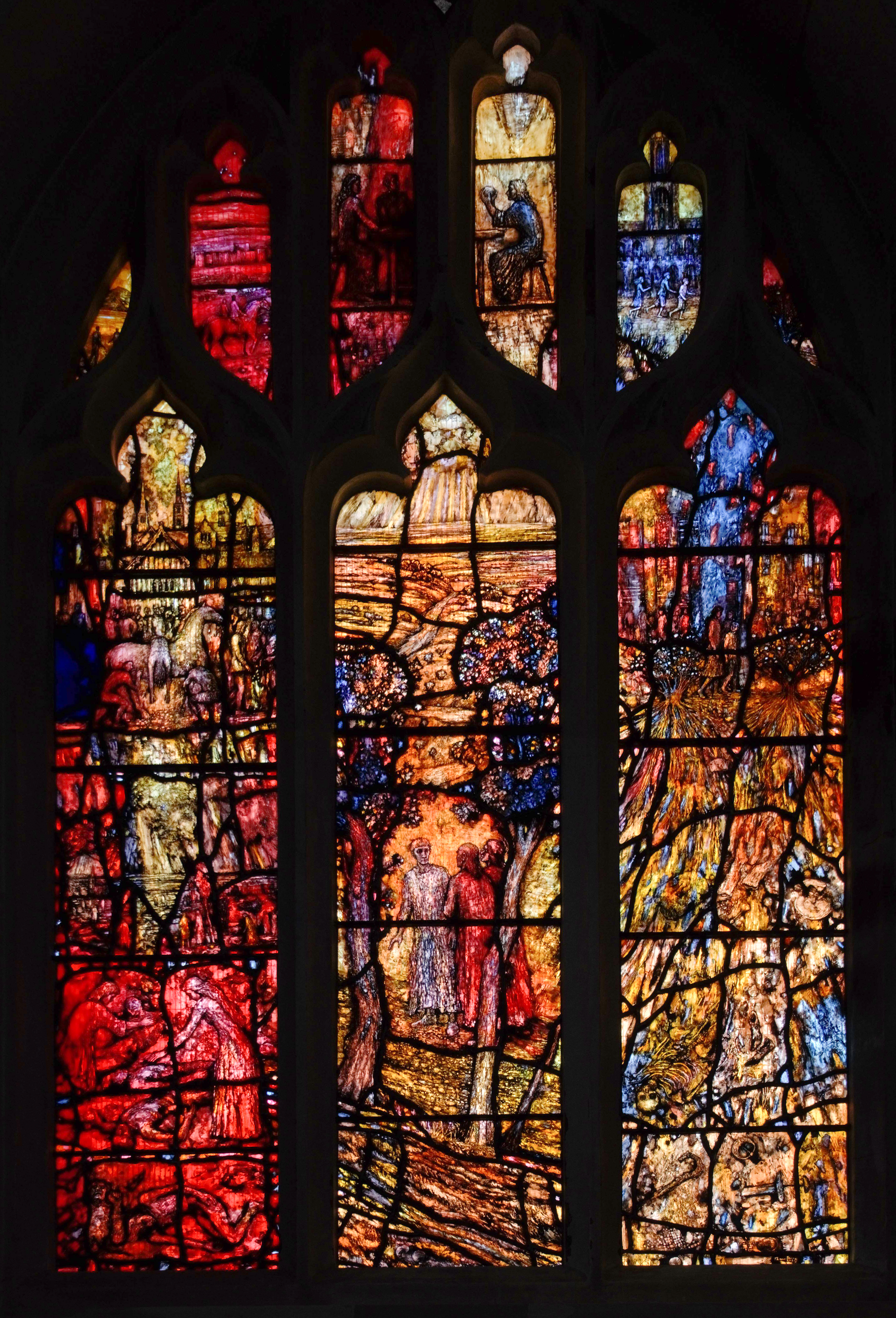
Richard III windows, west (2016) - Leicester Cathedral

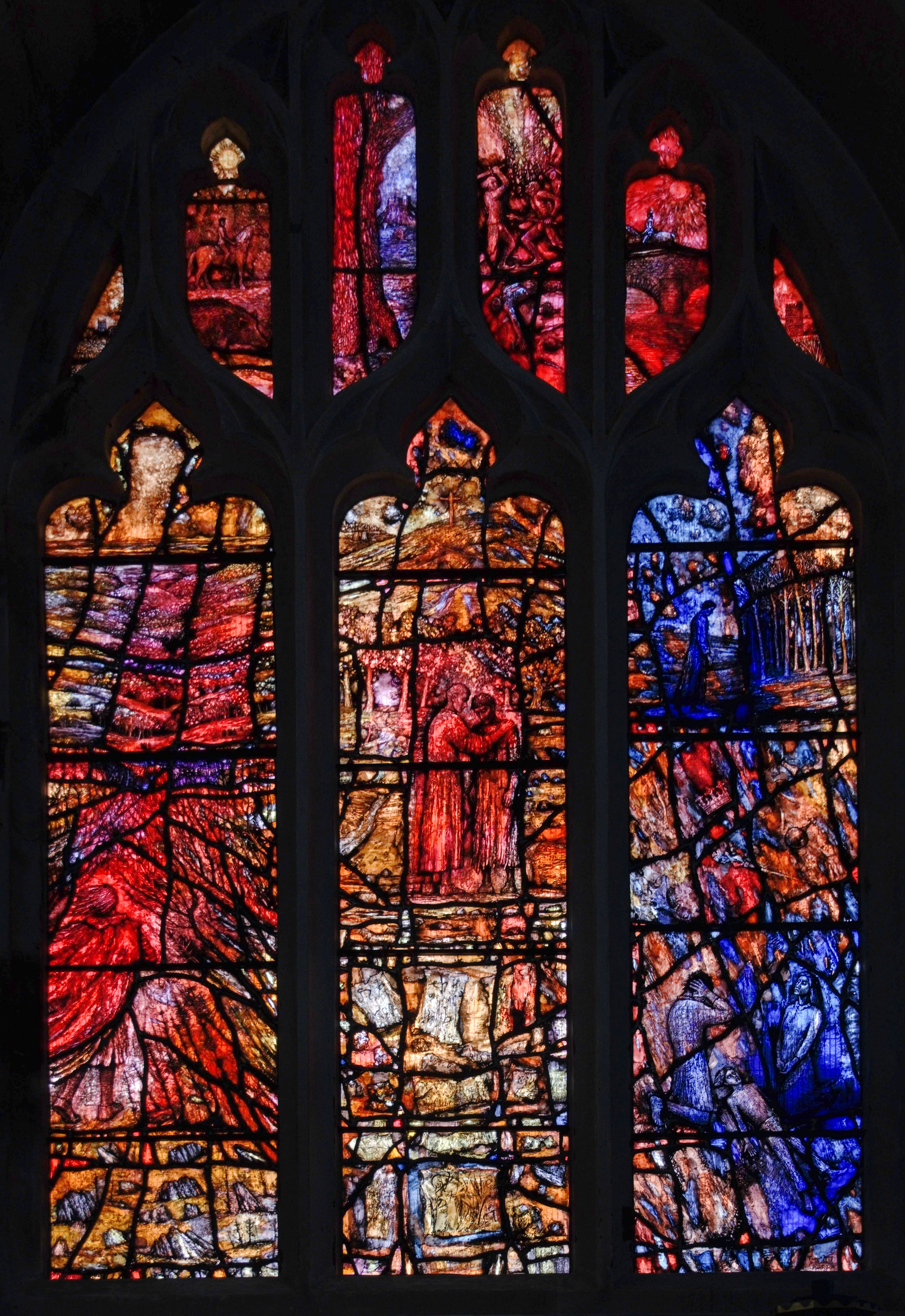
Richard III windows, east (2016) - Leicester Cathedral

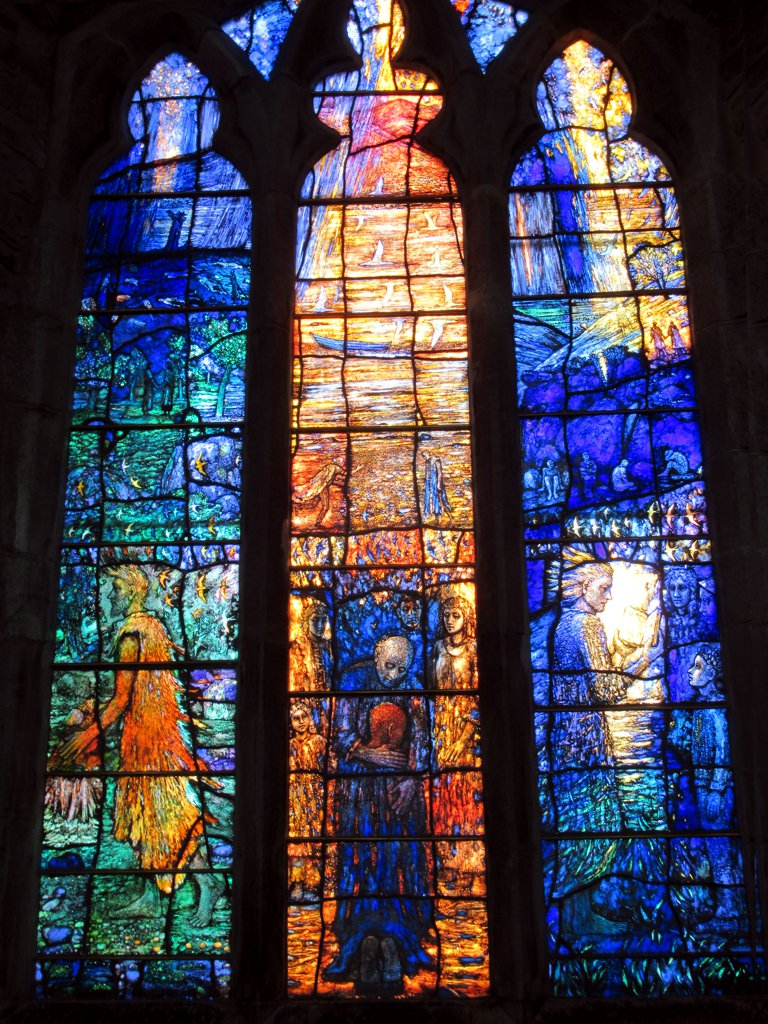
Window of Reconciliation (2017) - St John's Roman Catholic Church, Tralee

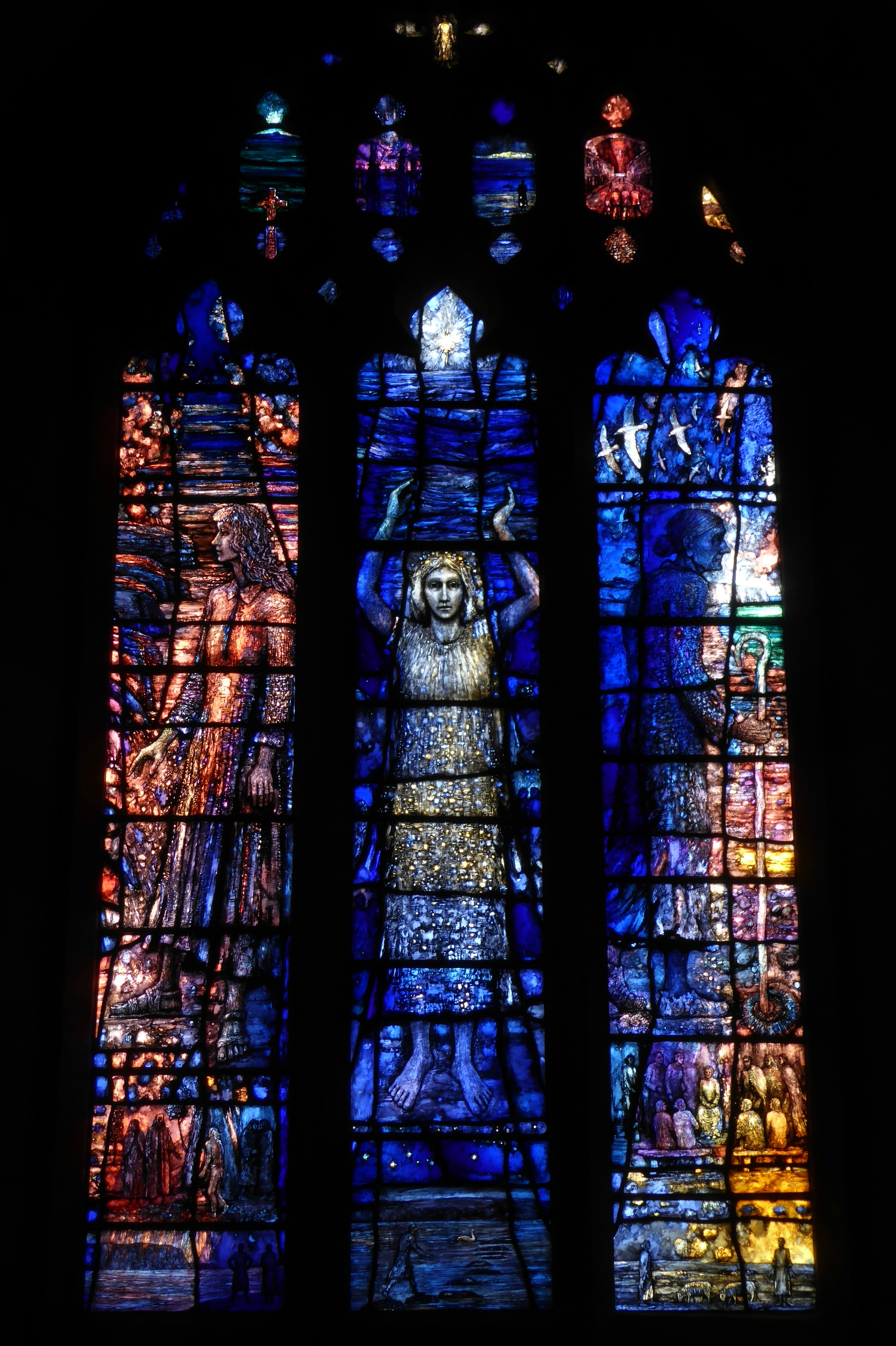
Stella Maris (star of the sea) window (2017) - St Peter's Church, Wallsend

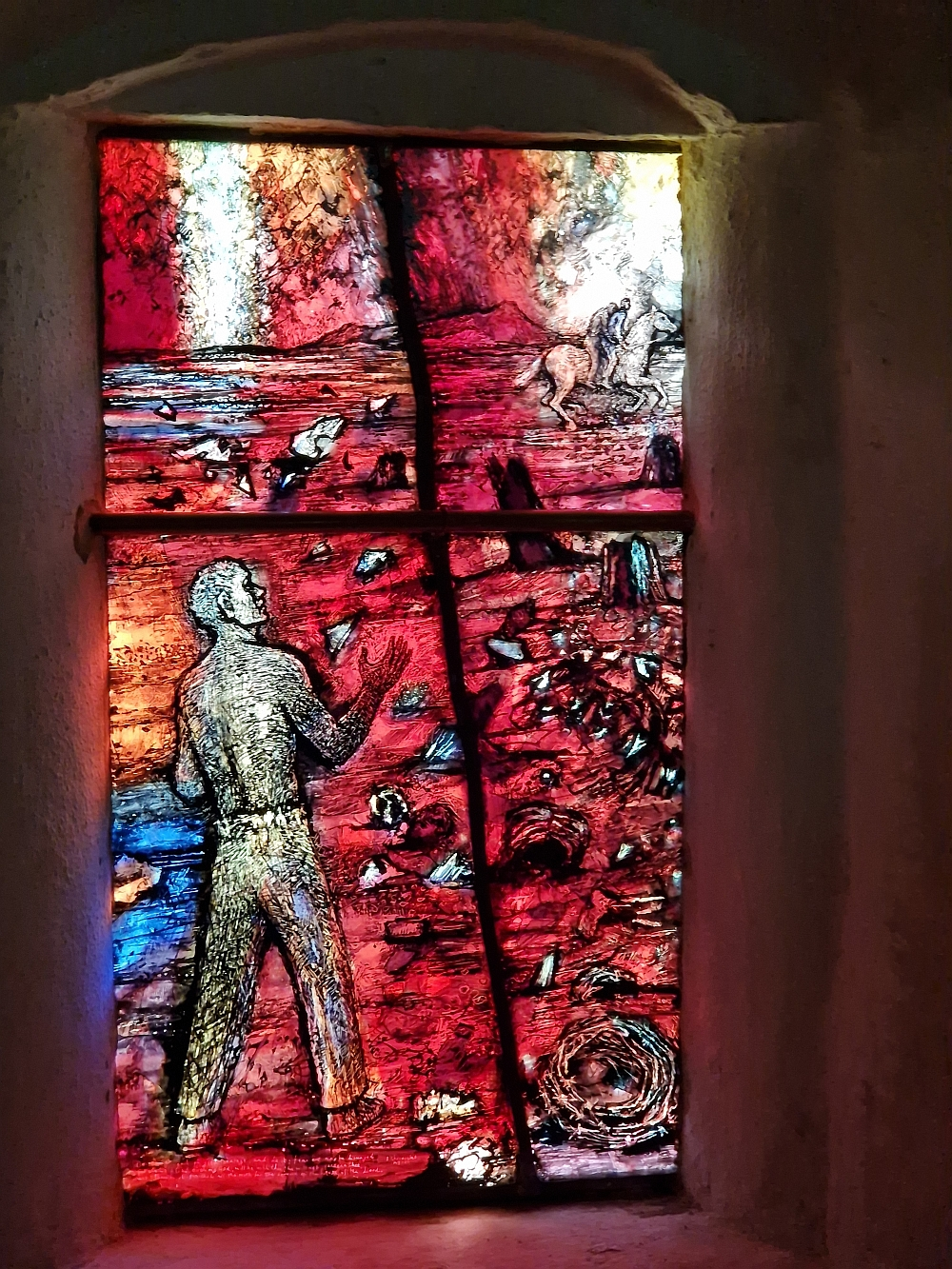
Private James Osborne VC memorial window (2019) - St Bartholomew's Church, Wigginton

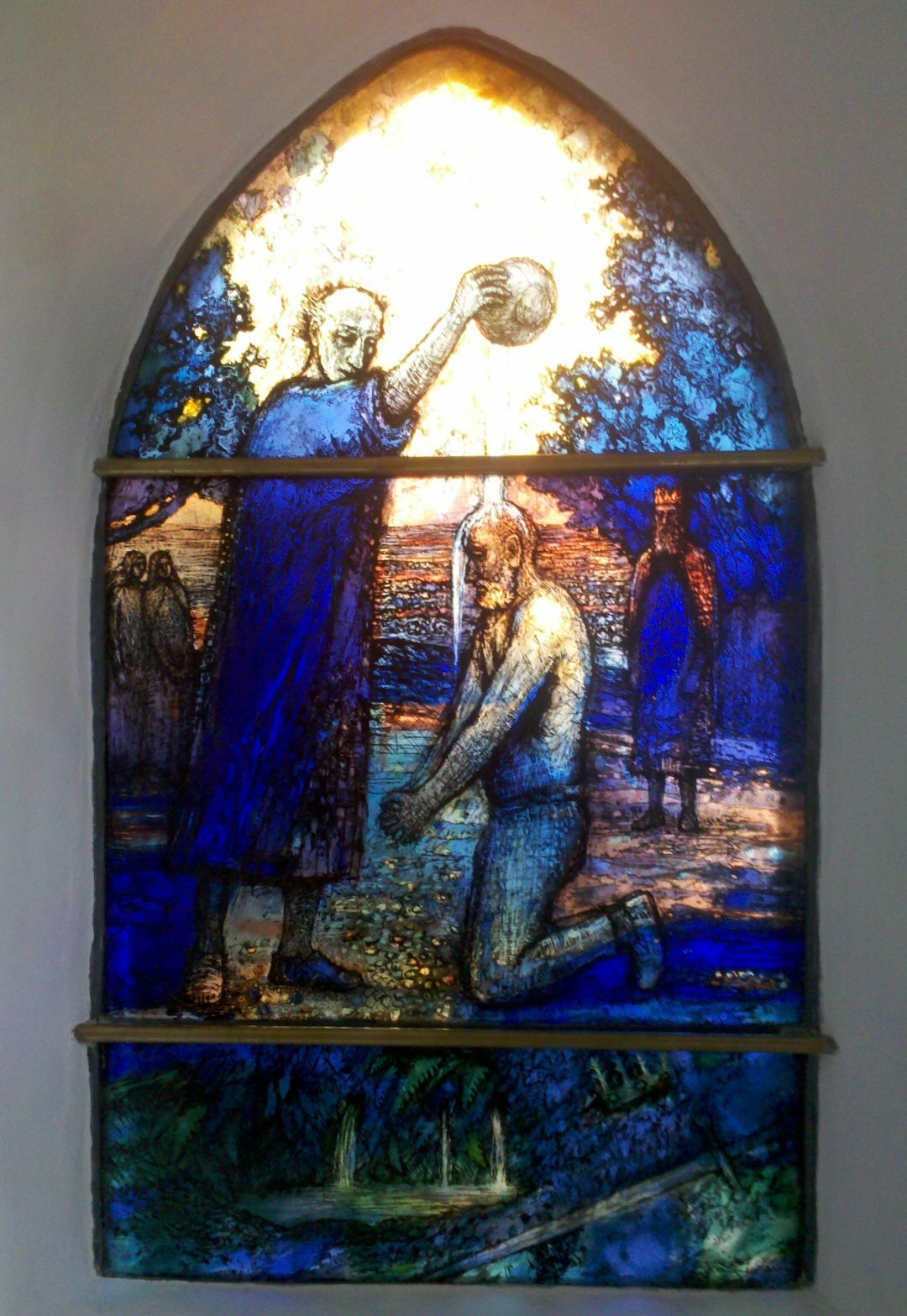
Baptism of King Cynegils (2018) - St Michael and St Mary Magdalene's Church, Easthampstead
