= Abenhall =

Village in Gloucestershire, England

Coordinates: 51°51′35″N 2°29′1″W

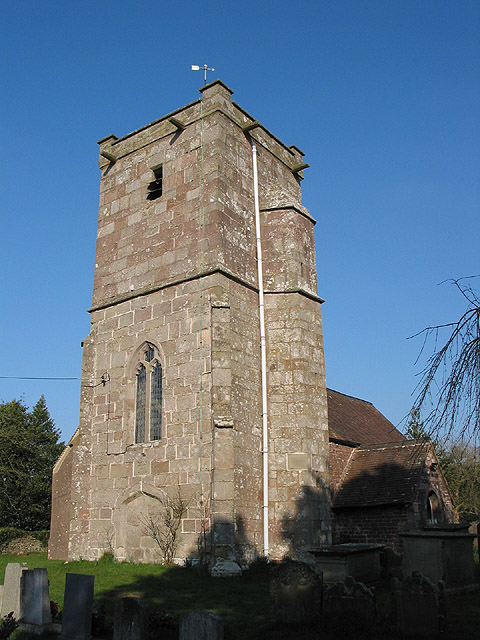
- St. Michael's Church

- Location within Gloucestershire
- Civil parish: Mitcheldean
- District: Forest of Dean
- Shire county: Gloucestershire
- Region: South West
- Country: England
- Sovereign state: United Kingdom
- Post town: Mitcheldean
- Postcode district: GL17
- Police: Gloucestershire
- Fire: Gloucestershire
- Ambulance: South Western
- UK Parliament: Forest of Dean

Abenhall is a small village in the civil parish of Mitcheldean, in the Forest of Dean district of the county of Gloucestershire, England. It lies on the road between Mitcheldean and Flaxley in the Forest of Dean. The village and much of the surrounding area was historically a centre for mining and iron-making.

== History ==
Abenhall was an ancient parish which included the more populous settlement of Plump Hill, and was once part of the Hundred of St Briavels (known as Dene at the time of the Domesday Book in 1086).

On 1 April 1935, Abenhall parish was abolished and merged with Mitcheldean. In 1931, at the last national census before the parish was abolished, Abenhall parish had a population of 230.

== St. Michael's Church ==
St. Michael's Church was originally built as a chapel of ease. The church was expanded in the 14th century to include nave, south aisle and tower. The arms of the Freeminers and modern freeminer window can be seen on the west side of the tower and emblems on the 15th century font. It is built of local red sandstone and has ornate contemporary carvings relating to the Forest of Dean's principal industries. These include a shield bearing the arms of the Freeminers on the west wall and a mid-15th century octagonal font, that has tools of miners and metalworkers incised on its sides. In the west tower is a window installed on 14 April 2011 by stained glass artist Thomas Denny; presented by the current free miners of the Forest of Dean to represent their gratitude and present day continuation of the ancient local customs of coal, iron ore and stone mining. St Michael's is 1.5 km south of Mitcheldean and set in beautiful surroundings on the edge of the Forest. Old Parish baptism, marriage and burial registers, from 1596, are stored at the Gloucestershire Record Office.
