= Freeminer =

Ancient title of coal and iron miners in England

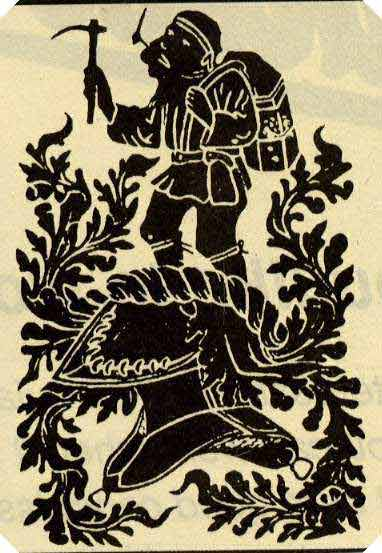
The "Freeminer Brass", a symbol of the Freeminers' authority above the Crown

Freeminer is an ancient title given to coal or iron miners in the Forest of Dean, Gloucestershire, England, who have earned the right to mine personal plots, known as gales.

== History of Freemining ==
For hundreds of years, mining of the Forest of Dean Coalfield and iron reserves has been regulated through a system of Freemining, with the Free Miner's Mine Law Court sitting at the Speech House from 1682. The earliest known existing copy of Dean Miners’ Laws and Privileges, known locally as the Book of Dennis, dates from 1610 but the copy itself contains references to much earlier origins. It also claims that Freemining rights were granted to Foresters by Edward I who, in so doing, also confirmed that such 'customes and franchises' had existed since 'tyme out of mynde'. Freeminers had been instrumental in recapturing Berwick-upon-Tweed several times (1296, 1305 and 1315) and it is thought that these privileges were granted as a reward for their endeavours.

A plaque bearing the engraved coat of arms of the Freeminers is on the Greyndour tomb in the Clearwell Chapel in Newland church, and other important medieval and modern mining emblems are in the Freeminers Guild church of St. Michael in Abenhall.

Towards the end of the 18th century, as the Industrial Revolution began to take hold, increasing demand for coal and iron led to conflicting mining interests and the Mine Law Court became bogged down with disputes. Deep coal and iron reserves could not be mined without substantial investment and the Crown became determined to introduce the free market into the Forest. In 1777 Mine Law Court documents mysteriously disappeared from the Speech House where they were stored and the court fell into disarray. Most of the Court documents were later found to have been in the possession of local Crown officials (Deputy Gavellers), and they were produced as evidence at an inquiry some 50 years later.

Dean Forest (Mines) Act 1838
- Act of Parliament
- Parliament of the United Kingdom
- Long title: An Act for regulating the opening and working of Mines and Quarries in the Forest of Dean and Hundred of Saint Briavels in the County of Gloucester.
- Citation: 1 & 2 Vict. c. 43

Dates
- Royal assent: 27 July 1838

Other legislation
- Amended by: Statute Law (Repeals) Act 1969

Status: Amended

Text of statute as originally enacted

Text of the Dean Forest (Mines) Act 1838 as in force today (including any amendments) within the United Kingdom, from legislation.gov.uk.

A royal commission was appointed in 1831 to inquire into the nature of the mineral interests and freemining customs in the Forest of Dean, leading to the passing of the Dean Forest (Mines) Act 1838, which now forms the basis of Freemining law. It confirmed the Freeminers' exclusive right to the minerals of the Forest of Dean, but also allowed Freeminers to sell their gales to a non-Freeminers, weakening the Freeminer's control and opening up the forest to outside industrialists.

The Coal Industry Nationalisation Act 1946 specifically exempted the Forest of Dean, due to its unique form of ownership and history, allowing Freemining privileges to continue intact. Some large colliery gales were subsequently compulsorily purchased by the National Coal Board (NCB), but these remained under the Freemining system, with a royalty paid to the Freeminers, by the NCB, as a share of the minerals extracted. The last of the NCB deep mines closed in 1965.

== Eligibility ==
"All male persons born or hereafter to be born and abiding within the said Hundred of St Briavels, of the age of twenty one years and upwards, who shall have worked a year and a day in a coal or iron mine within the said Hundred of St Briavels, shall be deemed and taken to be Free Miners." the Dean Forest (Mines) Act 1838.

This qualification has recently been challenged on the grounds of sex discrimination and although legal opinion advised that the 1838 Act was not subject to Equal Rights legislation, the Forestry Commissioners who act as Gaveller of the Forest of Dean made the decision to enter females onto the register for the first time in 2010. It is now understood that the qualification of "male", also incorporates "or female."

The ancient administrative district, known as the "Hundred of St Briavels", is generally considered to be the whole of the statutory Forest of Dean and each parish adjoining it.

== Present day ==
The Dean Forest Mines Act is the basis for Free Mining today and Freemining is administered by the Deputy Gaveller; a post established in medieval times, recently held by Chartered mining engineer John Harvey MBE (retired March 2011), and succeeded by Daniel Howell.

As of 2025 there were thought to be probably around 100 Freeminers still alive today, although only a handful of collieries are still operating, due to the demanding nature and relatively high costs of small-scale extraction; the closure of maternity hospital facilities at the Dilke Hospital — so that it has become unusual to be born within the "Hundred of St Briavels" — and attempts by the UK government to exact commercial coal mining licence charges under the 1994 Coal Act add further difficulties.

Despite the modest level of activity, some Freemines do operate successfully, especially through diversification into non-traditional areas such as tourism and ochre mining. Freemining continues to be an important aspect of Forest of Dean culture and an important part of local identity.

== See also ==
- Clearwell Caves, working iron-ore mine, now open to the public.
- Forest of Dean Coalfield
