= St Briavels Hundred =

Ancient Gloucestershire hundred with Forest of Dean

Coordinates: 51.79°N 2.61°W

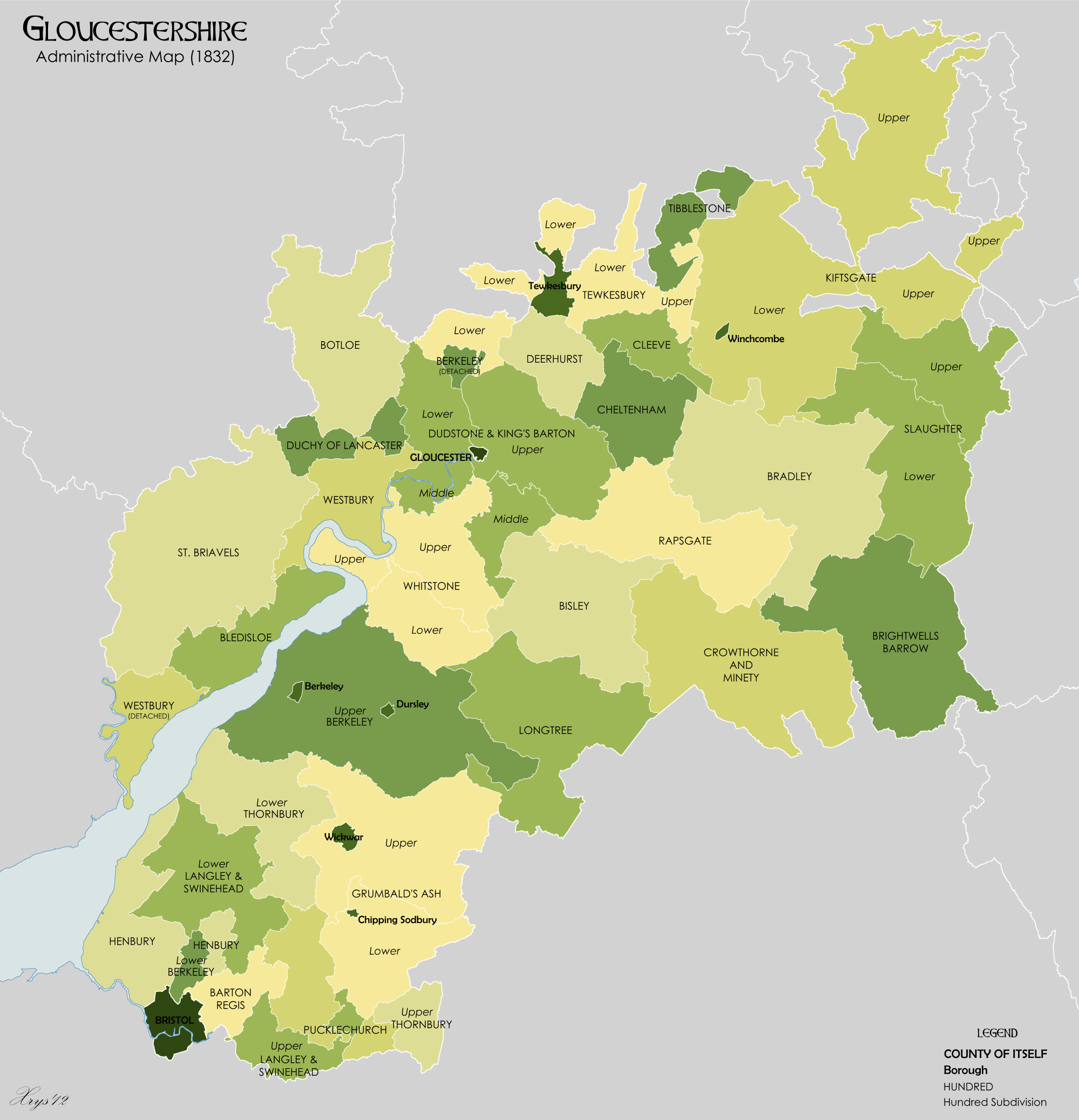
Gloucestershire Hundreds in 1832

St Briavels was an ancient hundred of Gloucestershire, England. It comprised the extra-parochial area of the Forest of Dean, and the following ancient parishes:

- Abenhall
- English Bicknor
- St Briavels
- Littledean
- Flaxley
- Hewelsfield
- Mitcheldean
- Newland
- Ruardean
- Staunton
- Lea (part)

The hundred was created some time between 1086 and 1220 to provide a structure for the administration of the Forest of Dean. The meeting place was St Briavels Castle.
