= The Slaughters =

The Slaughters may refer to:

- a family of poachers in Captain Planet and the Planeteers
- Upper Slaughter and Lower Slaughter, collectively

== See also ==
- Slaughters
