= George Backhouse Witts =

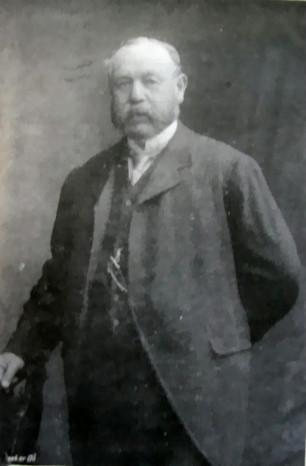
- Born: 1846; Winchcombe, Gloucestershire, England
- Died: 6 September 1912 (aged 65–66); Leckhampton, England
- Occupations: Civil engineer; Archaeologist
- Notable work: Archaeological Handbook of the County of Gloucester (1883)

George Backhouse Witts (1846 – 6 September 1912) was a British civil engineer and archaeologist who specialised in the prehistoric barrows of Gloucestershire. His Archaeological Handbook of the County of Gloucester (1883), the first such survey of the county, remained a standard work until the mid-20th century.

He later became a notable figure in the life of Leckhampton in Gloucestershire and as the local magistrate was once required to read the Riot Act on Leckhampton Hill to disperse a crowd of protesters intent on property damage.

== Early life and family ==
George Backhouse Witts was born in Winchcombe, Gloucestershire, in 1846 to Sophia Witts and the clergyman Edward Francis Witts, who was rector of Upper Slaughter in Gloucestershire as was his father the diarist Francis Edward Witts. George's father and grandfather were Lords of the Manor of Upper Slaughter. He was educated at the private Rugby School in Warwickshire.

In 1878, Witts married Sybil Catharine Vavasour in Cheltenham. Their daughter was Sybil Holdsworth Witts.

== Career ==
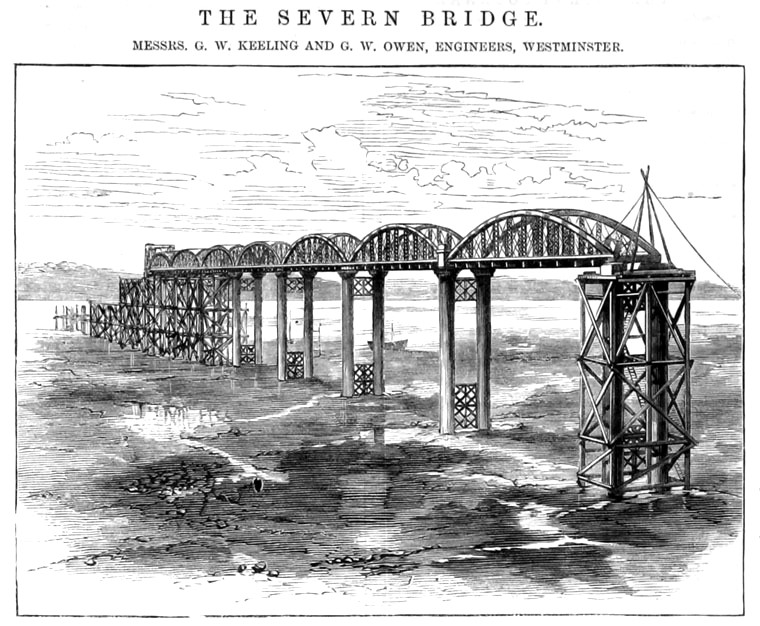
The Severn Railway Bridge under construction

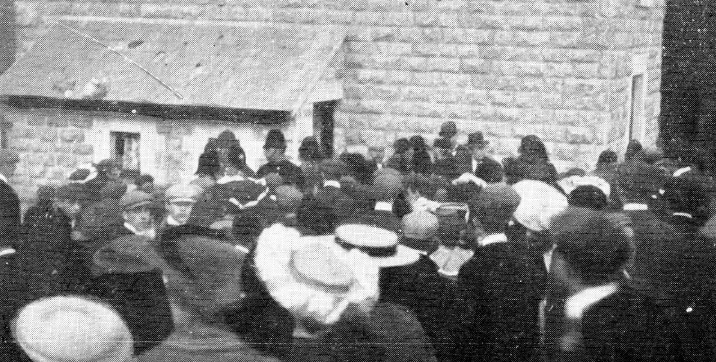
Reading the Riot Act at Leckhampton Hill, 1906

Witts qualified as a civil engineer and worked on the construction of the Cheltenham to Bourton-on-the-Water railway line as well as other railway projects in Gloucestershire such as the first Severn Railway Bridge.

He was a keen amateur archaeologist and a founding member of the Bristol and Gloucestershire Archaeological Society, specialising in the prehistoric barrows of Gloucestershire. His Archaeological Handbook of the County of Gloucester (1883) was the first such survey of the county, and remained a standard work until the mid-20th century.

Witts was heavily involved in local affairs and was chairman of Leckhampton council which set up a defence fund for the "Leckhampton Stalwarts" who had been arrested following the destruction of a newly built cottage that they claimed blocked their ancient right of way on to Leckhampton Hill. He was also the local magistrate and in 1906, during a later period of disorder on the hill, was forced to read the Riot Act to disperse a crowd who were intent on further damage to property.

His other activities included the Gloucestershire Rifle Volunteers, in which he was a lieutenant, being honorary secretary of the Cotswold Hunt, and participation in the Ancient Order of Foresters. He was a churchgoer and gave talks on the local area after which he would sometimes entertain the audience with Gloucestershire folk songs such as "The stwuns [stones] that built George Ridler's oven", a song with a secret meaning originally known only to members of The Gloucestershire Society.

== Death and legacy ==
George Witts died on 6 September 1912. His address at the time of his death was Hill House, Leckhampton, Cheltenham. Probate was granted to his daughter Sybil Holdsworth Witts, spinster, and Edward Clare Sewell, solicitor. He received an obituary in The Gloucester Journal.

Documents from Witts, and artefacts that he excavated, form the G. B. Witts Collection at the Wilson Museum in Cheltenham.

== Selected publications ==
- Archaeological Handbook of the County of Gloucester, Being an Explanatory Description of the Archaeological Map of Gloucester, by the same author &c. G. Norman, Cheltenham, 1883.
