= Lower Swell =

Village in Gloucestershire, England

Coordinates: 51.927299°N 1.749094°W

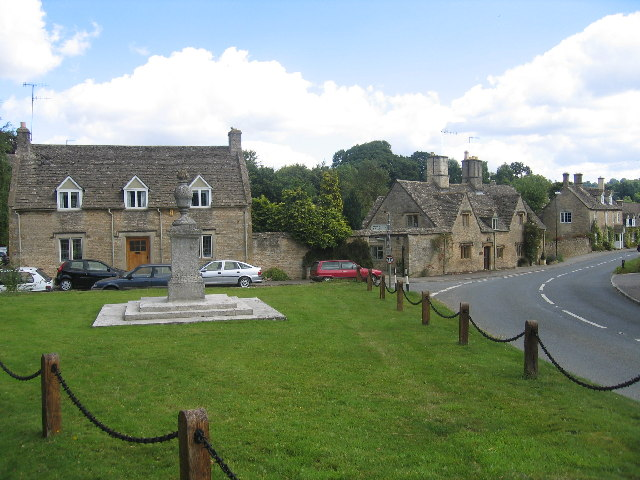
- Lower Swell War Memorial on the village green

- Location within Gloucestershire
- Population: 405
- OS grid reference: SP173254
- Civil parish: Swell
- District: Cotswold
- Shire county: Gloucestershire
- Region: South West
- Country: England
- Sovereign state: United Kingdom
- Post town: Stow-on-the-Wold
- Postcode district: GL54
- Dialling code: 01451
- Police: Gloucestershire
- Fire: Gloucestershire
- Ambulance: South Western

Lower Swell is a village in the civil parish of Swell, in the Cotswold district, in the county of Gloucestershire, England. It is located at the River Dikler, one mile from Stow-on-the-Wold. The village has "finest countryside, a tranquil village green and plenty of mellow stone cottages". The village church is dedicated to St. Mary.

== History ==
In 1931 the parish had a population of 360. On 1 April 1935 the parish was abolished and merged with Upper Swell to form Swell.

=== Origin of the name ===
Daniel Henry Haigh, a noted Victorian scholar of Anglo-Saxon history and literature, is certain that "swell" means "burning", or "funeral pile". He says that there was a battle fought by Offa of Mercia in the vicinity of Lower Swell. David Royce, who is the Vicar of Lower Swell, has said that during the reconstruction of the church "a long deep bed of ashes was discovered in his churchyard, and that, of eleven barrows in the parish, the largest is called Picked Morden, a name which seems equivalent to "selected slain". After he heard this testimony, Haigh came to the conclusion that the place where the Lower Swell church stands now was once used to bury "the burnt corpses of the nobles".

According to another theory, the name "Swell" came about from "the protuberant contours on the western side of the [Dikler] river".

The most widely accepted theory behind the name "Swell" is that it relates to a spring that rises in the grounds of the Abbotswood Estate to the north of the village and is an abbreviated version of "Our Lady's Well". The well can still be seen today.

== History of the village ==
In the Middle Ages the village's name was Little Swell. Documents indicate that the village was well developed by the 17th century, but was probably initially developed even earlier. The oldest extant buildings are dated to the 17th century. A notable 18th-century building that was built in 1786 is named the "Golden Ball".

Another interesting building was constructed in Hindu style in 1807. It was formerly a spa because of the mineral rich well that was discovered there, but the well has since become dry.

=== Lower Swell manor ===
Abbotswood is a Victorian mansion built on the site of the village manor. In 1086 the manor of Lower Swell was owned by Raoul II of Tosny and William II, Count of Eu. In the 13th century the Lower Swell manor was sold to Richard, 1st Earl of Cornwall (formally "King of the Romans", from 1257).

Richard, the Earl of Cornwall and brother of Henry III created the park of about 200 acres.The park was conveyed in 1545 to the Bishop of London and then later purchased, with ‘The Bowl’, by Sir Robert Atkyns in 1659. His son Sir Robert Atkyns lived in Lower Swell and wrote Ancient and Present State of Gloucestershire.

The Estate remained in the Atkyns family until 1844. It was bought by Alfred Sartoris in the 1860s. Sartoris was an army officer and magistrate, who had married Mary Barrington, daughter of Viscount Barrington, in 1856. Sartoris built Abbotswood house in 1862. It was sold to Mark Fenwick, former owner of Lambton's Bank in Newcastle, in 1901. Fenwick, a keen gardener, enlisted the help Sir Edwin Lutyens who added to the house in 1902 and laid out the gardens. Following Fenwick's death in 1945, the estate was acquired by Harry Ferguson.

Lutyens also designed Lower Swell War Memorial. The commission is presumed to have originated from his earlier work elsewhere in the village.

=== Nether Swell "manor" ===
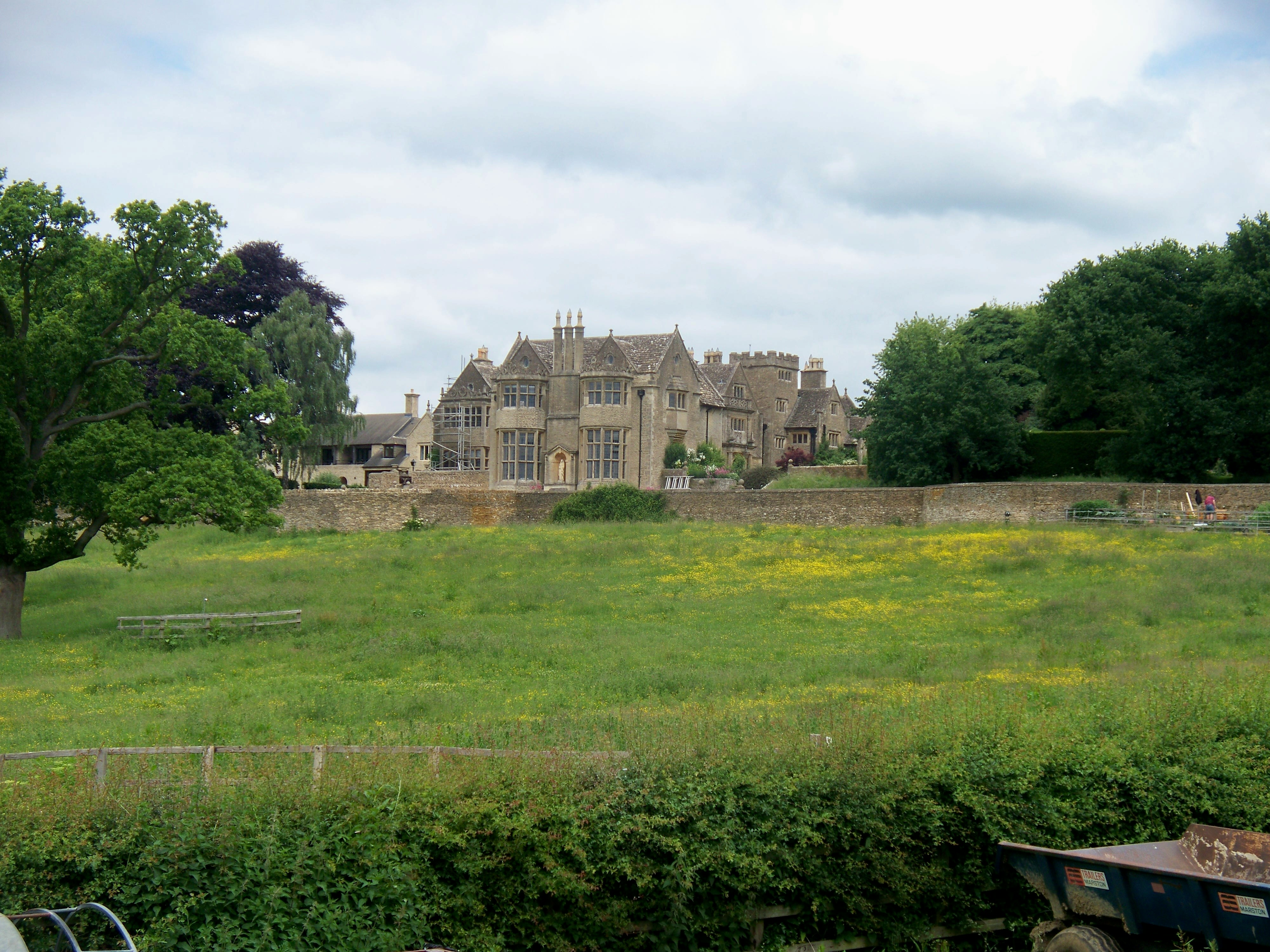
Nether Swell manor

Lower Swell manor is not to be confused with Nether Swell manor, a country mansion (with no title to the name of manor) in the west of Lower Swell, overlooking the valley of the river Dikler, built in Cotswold style by the architect Sir E. Guy Dawber for Walter Montague Scott between 1903 and 1909.

Scott's elder brother Sir John Murray Scott was for many years personal secretary to Sir Richard Wallace of Hertford House, London and Sudbourne Hall, Suffolk, and became a patron of Covent Garden Opera House. He had an important influence on the career of the famous singer Count John McCormack, who visited and sang for Scott at Nether Swell on occasions in 1912; and in 1922 (after Scott's death) McCormack recuperated from a severe infection and recovered his voice at Nether Swell.

Following evacuation from Kent, in 1945 Nether Swell manor became home to a private preparatory school for boys by the name of Hill Place School (Headmaster: E.H. Glaisyer) until its closure in 1969. It was then taken on by Luton Borough Council, and later Bedfordshire County Council for some years, as a Field study-centre before being sold for residential refurbishment and redevelopment.

== Local legend ==
There are a few ancient burial chambers located around Lower Swell. Some of them are/were marked with menhirs - standing stones. One of these stones is named the Whittlestone, or Whistle stone as it used to be called.

There is a local legend that the Whittlestone once belonged to immovable megaliths. The legend also includes the claims that the stones of Zennor Quoit are typically immovable. They cannot be moved by all the King's horses and all the King's men, and that if they are moved they will return to their initial places the morning after they are moved. The Whittlestone was moved, however, and contrary to the legend it remains at the location that it was moved to in the centre of Lower Swell.

Another legend states that the Whittlestone is a moving megalith, and every night, "when the Whistlestone hears Stow clock (a mile off) strike 12, it goes down to Lady-well (and the hill’s foot) to drink".
