= River Eye =

There are two rivers of this name in Great Britain:

- River Eye, Gloucestershire, England
- River Eye, Leicestershire, England

== See also ==
- Eye Water, a river in the Scottish Borders
- Eye Brook, a river in Rutland, England
