= River Dikler =

Dikler
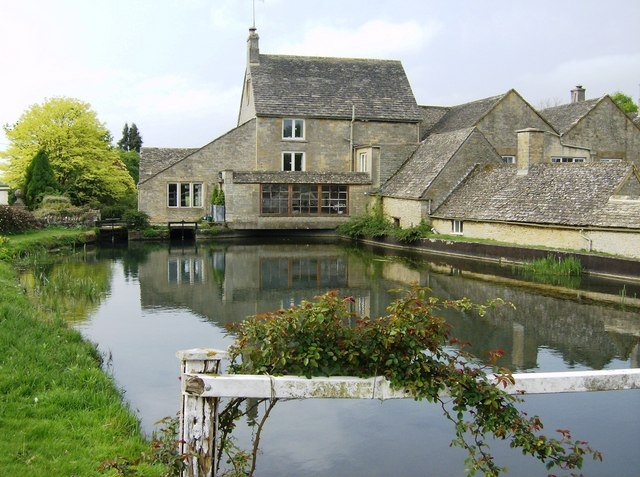
- River Dikler at Hyde Mill

- Location within Gloucestershire

Location
- Country: England
- County: Gloucestershire

Physical characteristics
- Source: Donnington
  - coordinates: 51.9496°N 1.7592°W
  - elevation: 160 m (520 ft)
- Mouth: River Windrush near Bourton-on-the-Water
  - coordinates: 51.8664°N 1.7412°W
  - elevation: 123 m (404 ft)
- Length: 12.3 km (7.6 mi)

Basin features
- River system: River Thames
- Tributaries
  - right: River Eye

The River Dikler is a short river in the Cotswold District of Gloucestershire which flows for 12 kilometres (7.5 mi) through Upper Swell and to the west of Stow on the Wold. It flows into the River Windrush, a tributary of the River Thames, just to the east of Bourton-on-the-Water.

== See also ==
- List of rivers of England
