= Miserden =

Village in Gloucestershire, England

Coordinates: 51°47′N 2°06′W

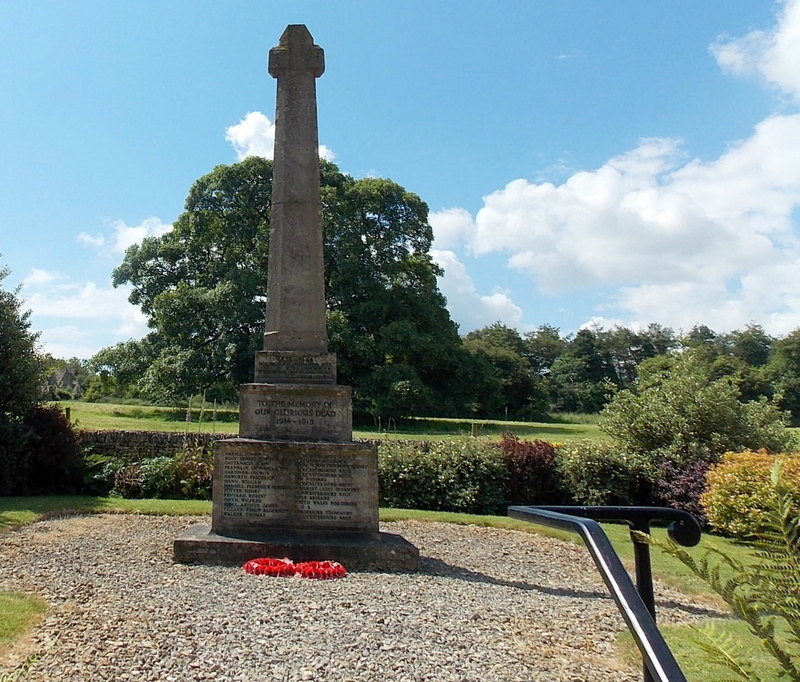
- Miserden War Memorial

- Location within Gloucestershire
- Population: 449 (parish, 2011 Census)
- Civil parish: Miserden
- District: Stroud
- Shire county: Gloucestershire
- Region: South West
- Country: England
- Sovereign state: United Kingdom
- Post town: Stroud
- Postcode district: GL6
- Police: Gloucestershire
- Fire: Gloucestershire
- Ambulance: South Western
- UK Parliament: Stroud

Miserden is a village and civil parish in Stroud District, Gloucestershire, England, 4 mi (6.4 km) north east of Stroud. The parish includes Whiteway Colony and the hamlets of Sudgrove and The Camp. In the 2001 census the parish had a population of 420, increasing to 449 at the 2011 census. The village lies in the Cotswolds at an elevation of over 240 m (790 ft) above the valley of the River Frome.

== Name and etymology ==
Until the Middle Ages, Miserden was known as Greenhampstead, and was mentioned by that name in the Domesday Book. The name Miserden derives from Musardera, "Musard's manor" - Musard was the name of the family which held the manor at the time of the Domesday Book. Robert Musard built Miserden Castle in the 12th century.

== Church ==
The Church of England parish church, dedicated to St Andrew, is of Saxon origin, though one leading authority has commented severely that "most of its archaeological interest was destroyed in the drastic nineteenth-century restoration". However, the same authority concedes that "the sanctuary is beautiful" and also praises the monuments in the church to Sir William Sandys (d.1640) and William Kingston (d.1614). The church is a Grade II* listed building.

Miserden War Memorial is opposite the church. The memorial was designed by the renowned architect Sir Edwin Lutyens and is a grade II listed building.

== House and gardens ==
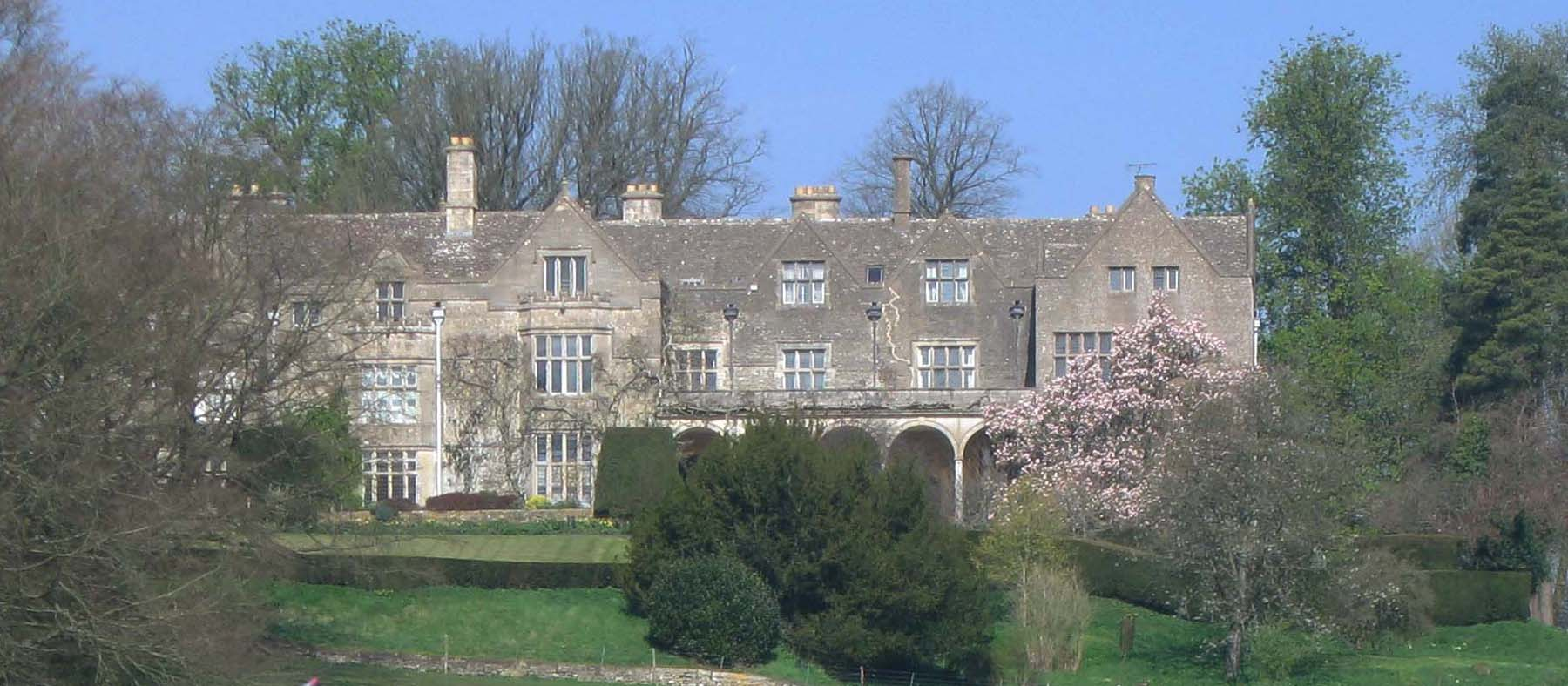
Miserden Park house

The original house was constructed in the 1620s with a large garden laid out at around the same time. An entry in the Western Times described it as:

[A] fine old Elizabethan house [which] stands in a thickly-wooded park, with the River Frome running through it. It was garrisoned by Cromwell during the Civil War, and close by are the ruins of an ancient castle built by Musard, a Norman Baron, and destroyed during the Wars of the Roses. The property extends to 2,370 acres, and there are 700 acres of woods. Two advowsons and three manors go with the estate.

A large area of glass houses was added in the early part of the 20th century, now used to house a Nursery and Cafe for visitors. Further additions and reshaping of the garden were done by Edwin Lutyens, who contributed the five-bay Tuscan loggia. The gardens are today open to the public.

== In fiction ==
The battle and siege scenes in Brother Cadfael's Penance by Ellis Peters (a pen name of Edith Pargeter) are set in the castle built by the Musard family, given the name of "La Musarderie" in the novel. The story is set in the 12th century, in December 1145 as the Anarchy reaches stalemate. The book includes a map of Greenhamsted, the castle and nearby Winstone, and the road that leads either to Gloucester or the other way, to Cirencester, to an Augustinian monastery.
