= Donnington Brewery =

Small brewery in England

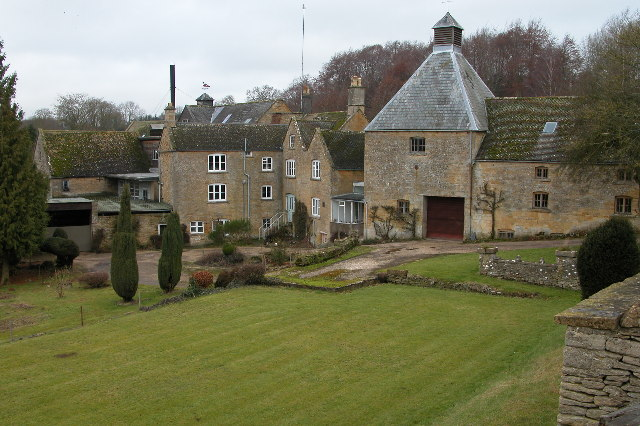
Donnington Brewery

The Donnington Brewery is a small brewery near the village of Donnington near Stow-on-the-Wold in Gloucestershire, England.

Thomas Arkell began brewing at this site in 1865. The brewery was later run by a descendant, Claude Arkell, until his death in 2007 when it passed to Claude's cousins, Peter and James from Arkell's Brewery.

There are ten workers at the brewery and with the help of one lorry and a van they deliver 2,000 gallons of beer a week throughout the winter, rising to 3,500 in the summer. Donnington Brewery brews two draught beers, SBA and BB, having stopped making its Mild XXX, and three bottled beers – Light, Brown and Double D – that are non-pasteurised and sit working in the bottle for up to five weeks.

These are sold through its 18 tied pubs around the Cotswolds. There were two more tied pubs: The Merry Mouth which is still trading but no longer owned by Donnington, while The Bell at Winchcombe was sold by its last landlord and the site converted into houses. A "Donnington run" means visiting 15 of the pubs in a single evening with a path called the Donnington Way connecting them.
