= Miserden War Memorial =

War memorial in Miserden, Gloucestershire, England

- United Kingdom
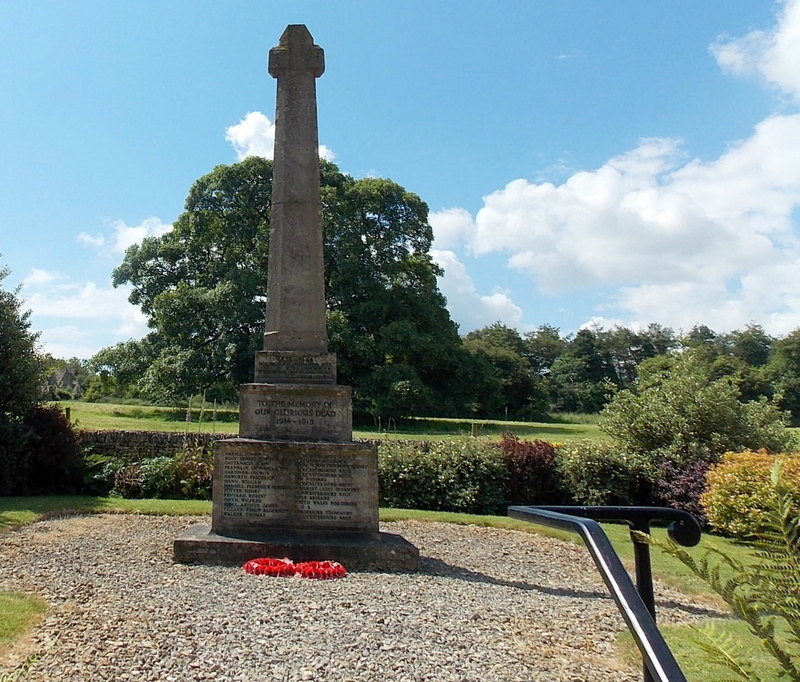
- For men of Miserden killed in the First World War
- Unveiled: unknown
- Location: 51.77857°N 2.09385°W; Miserden, Gloucestershire near Stroud
- Designed by: Sir Edwin Lutyens

Listed Building – Grade II
- Official name: Miserden War Memorial
- Designated: 24 March 1987
- Reference no.: 1091224

Miserden War Memorial is a First World War memorial in the village of Miserden, near Stroud, in Gloucestershire, south-western England. The memorial, designed by Sir Edwin Lutyens, is today a grade II listed building.

== Background ==
In the aftermath of the First World War and its unprecedented casualties, thousands of war memorials were built across Britain. Amongst the most prominent designers of memorials was the architect Sir Edwin Lutyens, described by Historic England as "the leading English architect of his generation". Lutyens designed the Cenotaph on Whitehall in London, which became the focus for the national Remembrance Sunday commemorations, as well as the Thiepval Memorial to the Missing—the largest British war memorial anywhere in the world—and the Stone of Remembrance which appears in all large Commonwealth War Graves Commission cemeteries and several of Lutyens's civic war memorials. Miserden's is one of fifteen War Crosses by Lutyens, all sharing a similar design.

Many of Lutyens' commissions for war memorials originated from friends and previous clients. His commission for Miserden's memorial appears to have come through local landowner Noel Wills for whom Lutyens carried out work at nearby Misarden Park after it was severely damaged by a fire in 1919.

== History and design ==
The memorial stands opposite the village church. It is a typical Lutyens War Cross with a tapering shaft and short arms, of limestone construction. The cross sits on an unusually large plinth of three rectangular stone blocks which itself sits on a small square base. Unusually among war crosses, the names of the fallen are inscribed on the lowest section of the plinth in bronze lettering. The second stage of the plinth contains the memorial's dedication: "TO THE MEMORY OF OUR GLORIOUS DEAD 1914–1919". Above, on the top section of the plinth, the dates of the Second World War and the names of the village's fallen from that conflict were added at a later date.

From the markings "VH 1920" on the back, it is believed that Victor Hayward, the stonemason on the Misarden Park estate constructed the memorial. Details of the unveiling ceremony are unknown, but it likely took place in 1920.

Miserden War Memorial was designated a grade II listed building on 25 August 1960. In March 2015, as part of commemorations for the centenary of the First World War, Lutyens' war memorials were recognised as a "national collection" and all of his free-standing memorials in England were listed or had their listing status reviewed and their National Heritage List for England list entries were updated and expanded.

== See also ==
- Lower Swell War Memorial, another Lutyens memorial elsewhere in Gloucestershire
