= Donnington, Gloucestershire =

Village in Gloucestershire, England

Coordinates: 51°57′5.727″N 1°43′16.746″W

Donnington
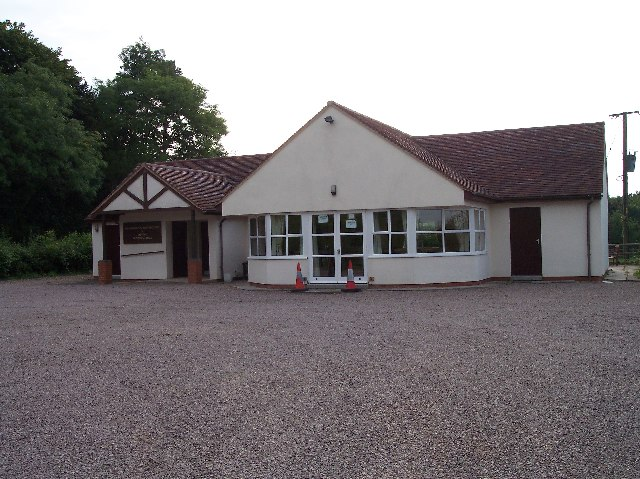
- Broom's Green, Donnington and Ryton Memorial Hall

- Location within Gloucestershire
- OS grid reference: SP193281
- Civil parish: Donnington
- District: Cotswold
- Shire county: Gloucestershire
- Region: South West
- Country: England
- Sovereign state: United Kingdom
- Post town: Moreton-in-Marsh
- Postcode district: GL56
- Police: Gloucestershire
- Fire: Gloucestershire
- Ambulance: South Western
- UK Parliament: North Cotswolds

Donnington is a small village and civil parish in Gloucestershire, near the Roman Fosse Way in the Cotswold District Council area of south west England. It is situated on a hill a mile and a half north of Stow-on-the-Wold, of which until 1894 it formed a detached hamlet, so that the north transept in the parish church was reserved for the parish. There are fine views over the Evenlode valley.

It is notable for its Cotswold stone houses. They include Donnington mill, on a medieval site, where the river Dikler emerges to form an artificial lake and mill pond of nearly five acres, which became Richard Arkell's Donnington Brewery in 1865; Little Barrow, a late Arts and Crafts movement country house on a medieval site remodelled and extended from a house of about 1800 in Cotswold manorial style with gardens by the distinguished Sussex architect Walter Godfrey in the 1930s; and Donnington Manor, just north of the village, which dates to the 18th century, when it may have been rebuilt on the site of an earlier house. Crawthorne Wood of over 50 a. is the only large area of woodland.

On 21 March 1646 the Battle of Stow-on-the-Wold, the last pitched battle of the English Civil War, is believed to have taken place in the parish, when Lord Astley and 3,000 Royalists were defeated by Parliamentarian forces.
