= Lower Swell War Memorial =

War memorial in Swell, Gloucestershire, England

- United Kingdom
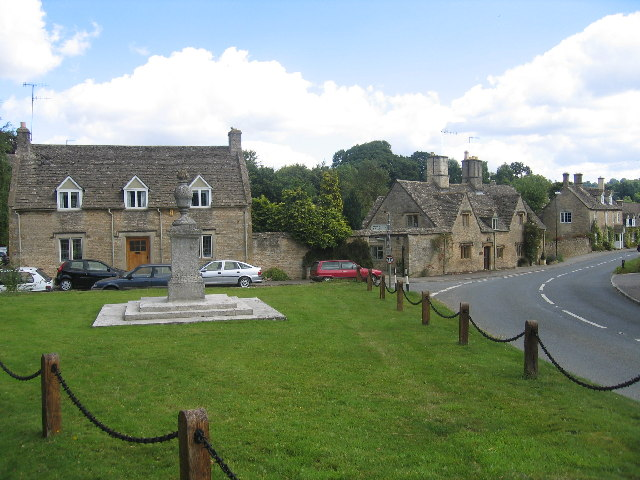
- For men from Lower Swell killed in the First World War
- Unveiled: 31 July 1921
- Location: 51.92801°N 1.74871°W; Lower Swell, Gloucestershire near Stow-on-the-Wold
- Designed by: Sir Edwin Lutyens

Listed Building – Grade II
- Official name: Lower Swell War Memorial
- Designated: 25 August 1960
- Reference no.: 1089867

Lower Swell War Memorial is a First World War memorial in the centre of the village of Lower Swell in Gloucestershire in south-western England. The memorial, designed by Sir Edwin Lutyens, was unveiled in 1921 and is today a grade II listed building.

== Background ==
In the aftermath of the First World War and its unprecedented casualties, thousands of war memorials were built across Britain. Amongst the most prominent designers of memorials was the architect Sir Edwin Lutyens, described by Historic England as "the leading English architect of his generation". Lutyens designed the Cenotaph on Whitehall in London, which became the focus for the national Remembrance Sunday commemorations, as well as the Thiepval Memorial to the Missing—the largest British war memorial anywhere in the world—and the Stone of Remembrance which appears in all large Commonwealth War Graves Commission cemeteries and in several of Lutyens's civic war memorials.

Many of Lutyens' commissions for war memorials originated from friends or pre-war clients in the area. In Lower Swell it appears the commission was made through Mark Fenwick, a regular client for whom Lutyens renovated his nearby house, Abbotswood in the early 1900s.

== History and design ==
The memorial consists of a sculpture of a flaming, bulbous urn, which stands on a square pedestal and base of three shallow steps, all in limestone ashlar. It stands on a green in the centre of the village. The south-west side of the pedestal is inscribed: IN MEMORY OF THE MEN OF NETHER SWELL WHO GAVE THEIR LIVES IN THE GREAT WARS". The south-east and north-west sides bear the dates of the First and Second World Wars in Roman numerals: MCMXIV – MCMXIX and MCMXXXIX – MCMXLV respectively. On the north-east side are the names of the fallen. The inscriptions relating to the Second World War and the "s" in "Great Wars" were added at a later date, one of a variety of ways in which First World War memorials were adapted to take account of the casualties from the Second World War.

The memorial was unveiled on 31 July 1921 by Colonel Brooke, DSO, of the Grenadier Guards.

Lower Swell War Memorial was designated a grade II listed building on 25 August 1960. In March 2015, as part of commemorations for the centenary of the First World War, Lutyens' war memorials were recognised as a "national collection" and all of his free-standing memorials in England were listed or had their listing status reviewed and their National Heritage List for England list entries were updated and expanded.

== See also ==
- Miserden War Memorial, another Lutyens memorial elsewhere in Gloucestershire
