= Miserden Castle =

Castle in Gloucestershire, England

- Gloucestershire, England
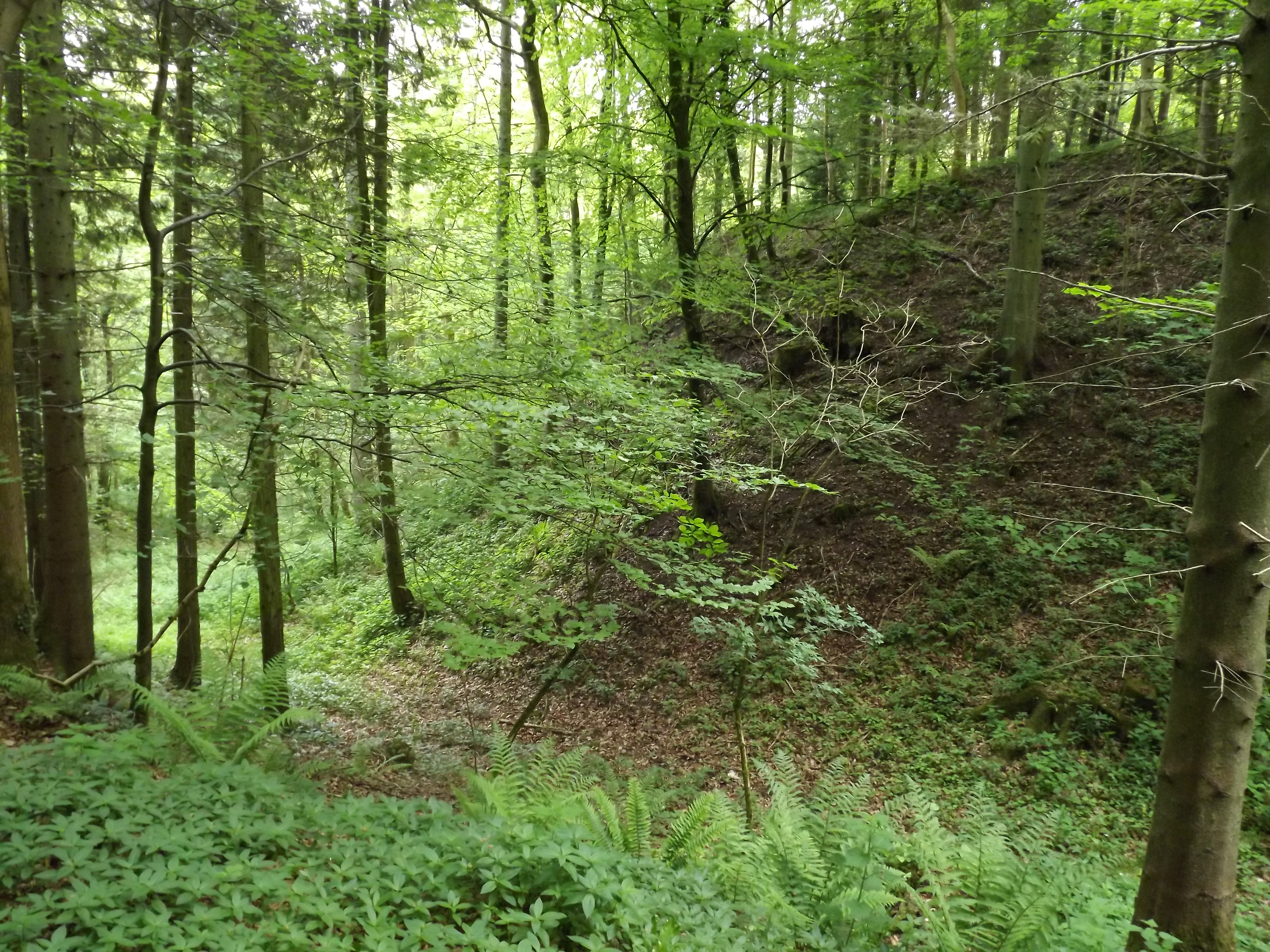
- Protective ditch and motte of Miserden Castle

Site information
- Type: Motte and bailey
- Open to the public: Yes
- Condition: Ruined

Location
- Shown within Gloucestershire.
- Location within Gloucestershire
- Coordinates: 51.78189°N 2.08256°W

Site history
- Materials: Earthworks and stone

Miserden Castle was a castle near the village of Miserden in Gloucestershire, England.

The castle is a large motte and bailey Norman castle, built before 1146 by Robert Musard, after whose family the local village is named. The castle overlooks the River Frome and included a 60-foot (18 m) wide shell keep, protected by a stone wall and a moat. The castle is positioned on a rocky spur, and the north side of the castle was probably flooded from the river to produce a wet moat, further strengthening the considerable defences. Musard was killed by forces loyal to King Stephen during the years of the Anarchy and the castle seized by Philip of Gloucester, but the castle survived into at least the 13th century. Some earthworks and masonry structures remain.

== See also ==
- Castles in Great Britain and Ireland
- List of castles in England
- Ellis Peters novel "Brother Cadfael's Penance" uses the castle within the story

== Bibliography ==
- Amt, Emilie. (1993) The Accession of Henry II in England: royal government restored, 1149-1159. Woodbridge, UK: Boydell Press. ISBN 978-0-85115-348-3.
- Pettifer, Adrian. (1995) English Castles: A Guide by Counties. Woodbridge, UK: Boydell Press. ISBN 978-0-85115-782-5.
