= Abbotswood, Gloucestershire =

Abbotswood
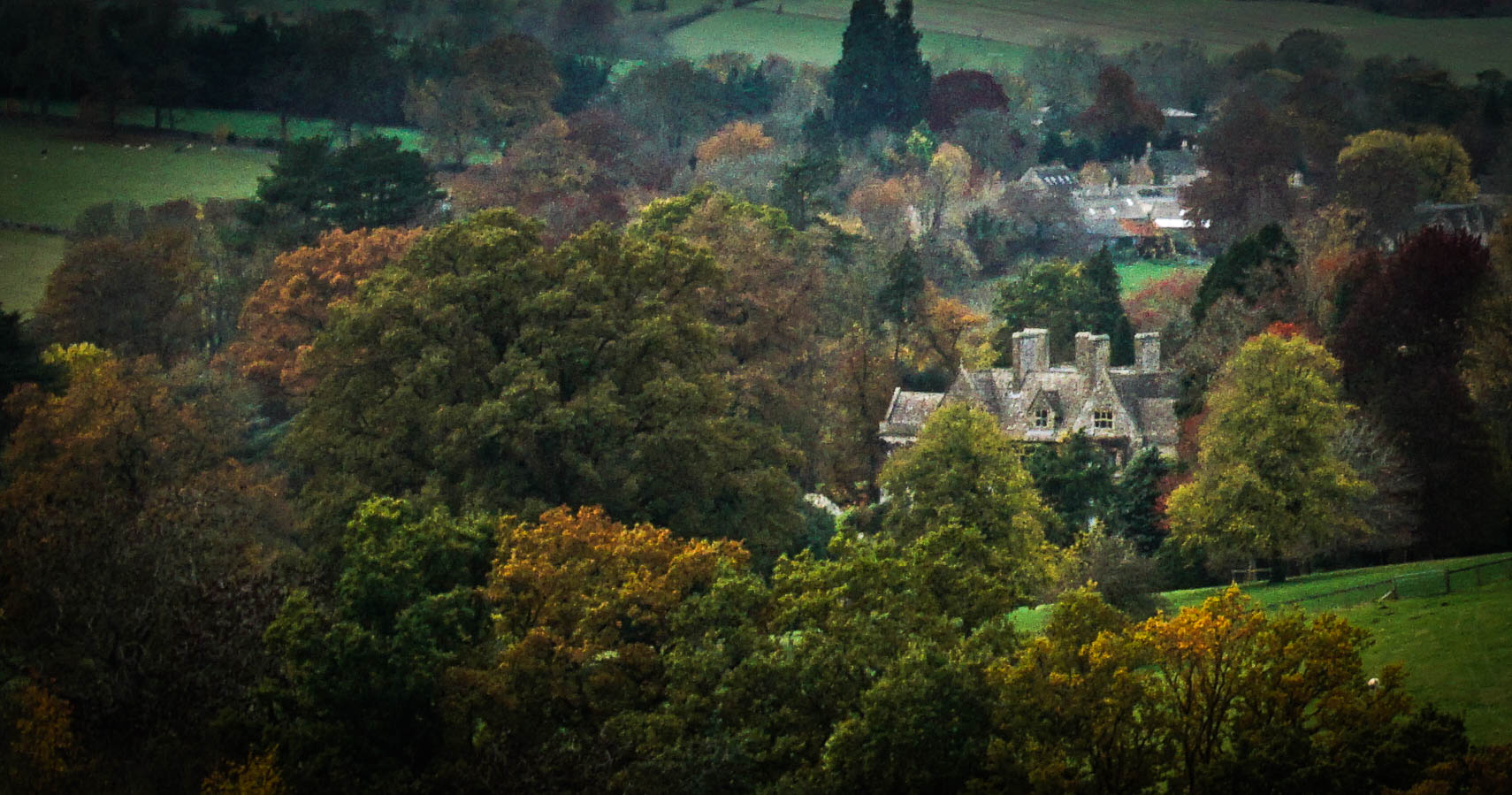
- Abbotswood Estate

- Location in Gloucestershire
- 51°56′05.86″N 01°44′16.66″W
- Location: Lower Swell, Gloucestershire, England

Abbotswood is a country house and estate near Lower Swell in Gloucestershire, England. It is a grade II listed building and estate, of medieval origins and with remodelling and garden work to the designs of Sir Edwin Lutyens from 1901 onwards.

== History ==
The ownership of lands in the manor of Lower Swell can be traced to the pre-conquest period, when one Ernesi possessed them. In 1086 the manor lands were divided between Raoul II of Tosny and William II, Count of Eu. Richard, 1st Earl of Cornwall acquired much of the lands before 1257 for a parkland; in 1257 he endowed Hailes Abbey with the manor, which remained its owner until the English Reformation. In 1545 it passed to the Bishop of London, and in 1591 was conveyed back to the Crown, then passing to one John Carter, and later to his son Giles, who mortgaged it in 1638 to Sir William Courteen. Courteen had assumed ownership by 1659, for he sold the estate to Robert Atkyns, a lawyer and member of the Third Protectorate Parliament for Evesham. Atkyns descendants sold the estate in 1844 to one John Hudson. Hudsen split the estate in 1865, selling 400 acres (160 ha) to the owner of lands in Upper Swell, Alfred Sartoris. Within his now merged estate, Sartoris built in 1867 a new country house, Abbotwood, removed from and on land elevated above the estate farm buildings.

In 1901 the estate was sold to Mark Fenwick, whose wealth derived from his involvement in mining and banking in Newcastle and Northumberland. Fenwick, a keen gardener, found the Abbotwood "far too ugly to live in" and against Lutyens' recommendation that he "blow it up, and start again!", engaged the architect to remodel the house and design gardens on what had been terraced lawns; Fenwick is credited with much of the planting within the estate. In 1946, the estate was sold to Harry Ferguson, the engineer and inventor noted for his role in the development of the modern agricultural tractor and, after the death of his widow, has been sold on a number of times.

== House ==
Abbotswood house is the principal of the estate's buildings, a 22,000 square feet (2,000 m^{2}) Cotswold stone L-shaped house dating back to the 1867 construction. Lutyens' external work on the house is concentrated on the north-side of the south-wing, where a projecting gabled roof falling to near ground level protects the main entrance; and on the west-side of the same wing where a series of narrow gables, terrace, ponds and a Loggia were added. Within, Lutyens created a new hall, grand staircase and reception rooms.

Externally, Lutyens added a paved terrace with a linear central lily-pond extending from the west gable of the south wing. A large formal garden, subdivided into symmetric sections by hedges, paths and terrace walls, was planted to the south of the house; a terrace immediately to the south overlooks the garden and provides views of the surrounding park. The upper section of the garden is planted as a series of squares, four in the centre and three each at the east and west. The lower garden formed a sunken tennis lawn with a herbaceous border; more recently, a lily-pond has been sited in the centre of the lawn. A hexagonal open-sided garden house is sited at the south-west of the lawn; and a summerhouse is built beneath the upper garden, looking out across the tennis lawn and with access from a path on the west side of the gardens. A 'stream garden' of lawns, shrubs and trees with water and rock features is to the west of the house and formal gardens.

== Estate ==
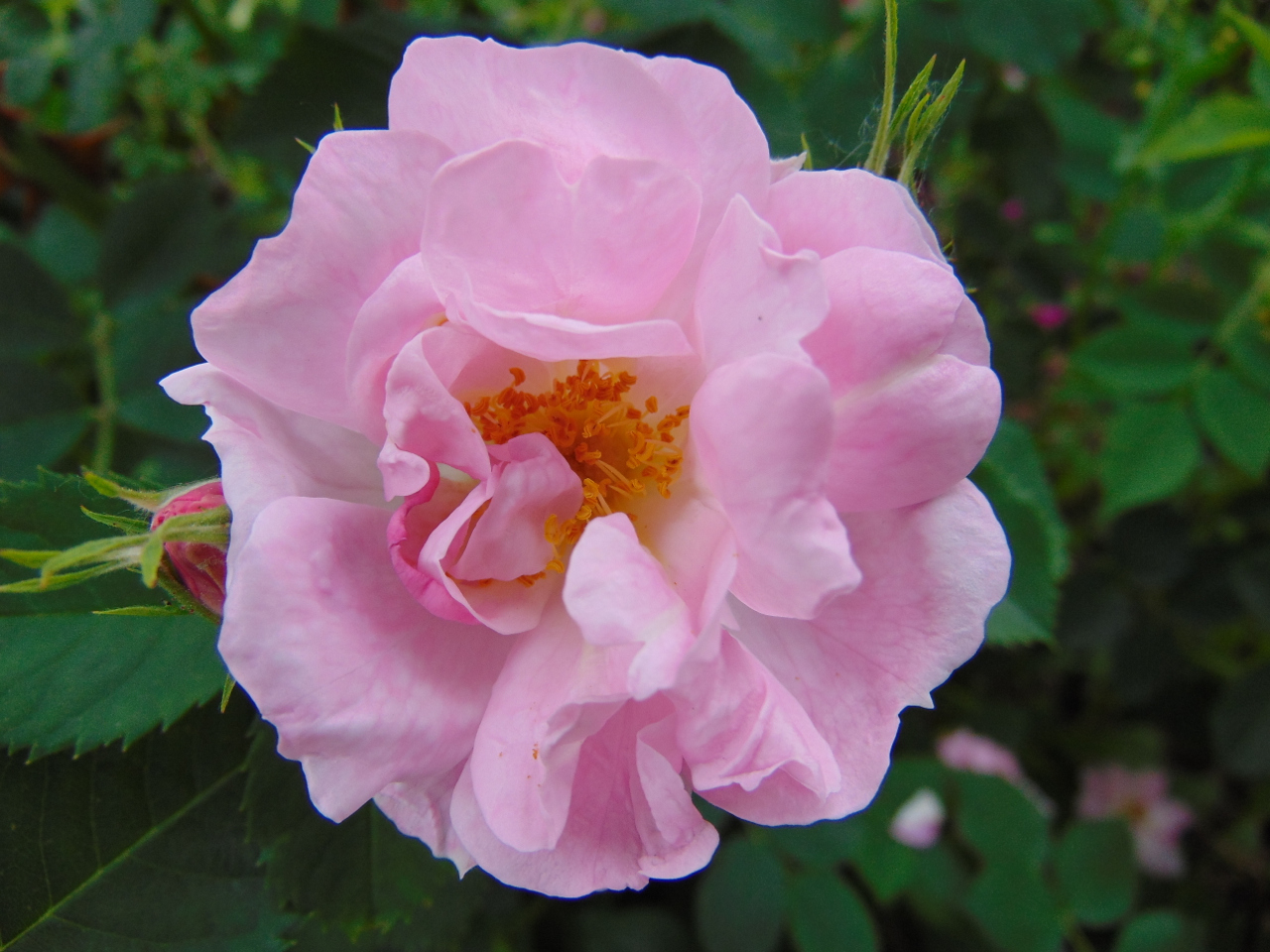
Rosa canina 'Abbotswood', a cultivar of the dog rose Rosa canina identified in the kitchen gardens of Abbotswood in the 1950s

Abbotswood House sits towards the north-east of the estate's circa 1 square kilometre (0.39 sq mi) park, through which the River Dikler runs north-to-south. The estate's farm buildings, stables and staff housing are to the south-west of the house, and to the east of these is found an orchard and a walled garden with glasshouses, all associated with a long-demolished pre-1867 principal estate house. Features within the park include a river-fed pond, a well, and remains of a medieval moat. The park and a number of its buildings form part of the main listing for Abbotswood, and elements of the estate such as lodges, gates and walls, have distinct listings.

== See also ==
- Lower Swell War Memorial, designed by Lutyens through the agency of Mark Fenwick.
