= Francis Edward Witts =

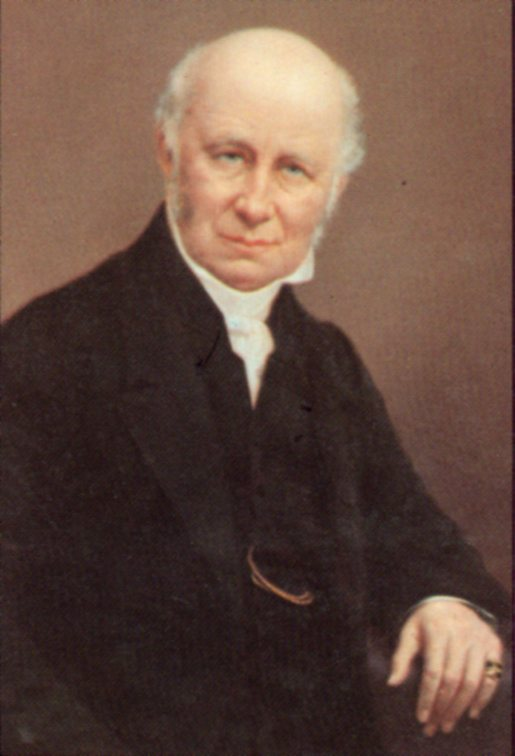
Francis Edward Witts

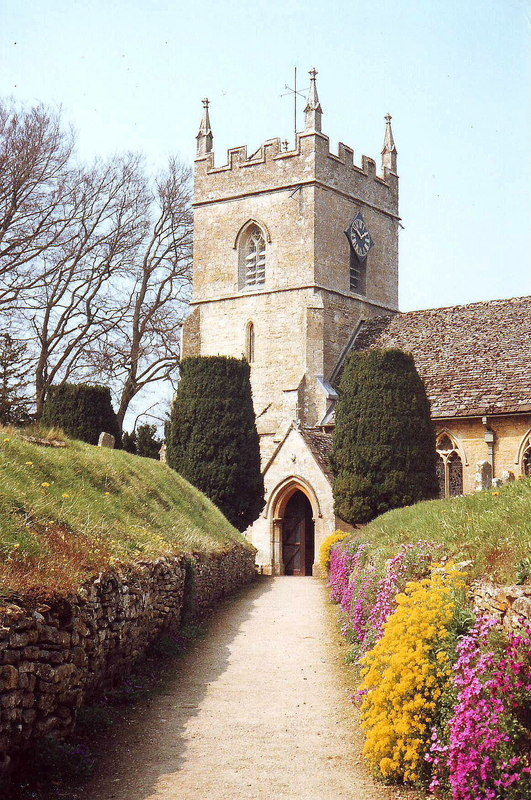
St. Peter's Church, Upper Slaughter.

Francis Edward Witts (1783–1854) was an English clergyman, diarist, and magistrate who was rector of Upper Slaughter in Gloucestershire.

== Early life and family ==
Francis Witts was born in 1783.

== Career ==
Witts was a clergyman, diarist, and magistrate. He was rector of Upper Slaughter in Gloucestershire.

== Death and legacy ==
Witts died in 1854.

His grandson was the civil engineer and archaeologist George Backhouse Witts.

== Selected publications ==
- The Diary of a Cotswold Parson
