= The Camp, Gloucestershire =

Hamlet in Gloucestershire, England

Coordinates: 51.78279°N 2.12692°W

The Camp
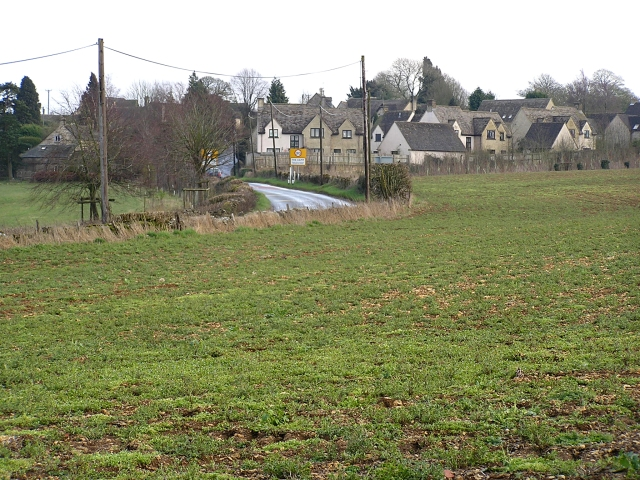

- Location within Gloucestershire
- OS grid reference: SO91340936
- Civil parish: Miserden
- District: Stroud
- Shire county: Gloucestershire
- Region: South West
- Country: England
- Sovereign state: United Kingdom
- Police: Gloucestershire
- Fire: Gloucestershire
- Ambulance: South Western

The Camp is a hamlet in the south of Gloucestershire, approximately 10 miles south of Cheltenham and 5 miles north-east of Stroud. It is in the parish of Miserden, a village about 2 miles east of The Camp.

The village clusters around two roads: Calf Way and Honeycombe Road. Calf Way is thought to be a Roman road, presumably named for the cattle driven along it. Honeycombe Road leads to Honeycombe Farm, and then on to Miserden.

How the village came to be known as The Camp is a matter of debate. Some sources claim that it is related to Neolithic camps – and there are the remains of Neolithic burial chambers close to the village. Others claim that it was a Civil War encampment. In either case, at some point before 1767, the village was known as Hazlehouse-Yate. Hazle House is a large house close to the village; "yate" means gate.

One of Neolithic barrows was opened in around 1720, and contained the skulls and skeletons of eight bodies. Another barrow was opened a few years later – this one contained human bones and an urn, and was assumed to be Roman (the village is not far from Ermin Street, one of the great Roman roads).

Over the years, there have been a number of businesses in the village, some serving locals, and others finding customers further afield: the New Inn was the village pub until the 20th century; the village had a bakery; a quarry supplied roof tiles to the region; there were a number of farms; a motorbike garage servicing classic bikes; and there is still a thriving riding school.

The Camp currently has around 25 houses … of which 10 had been built by 1779.
