= Lower Slaughter =

Village in Gloucestershire, England

Coordinates: 51.906°N 1.777°W

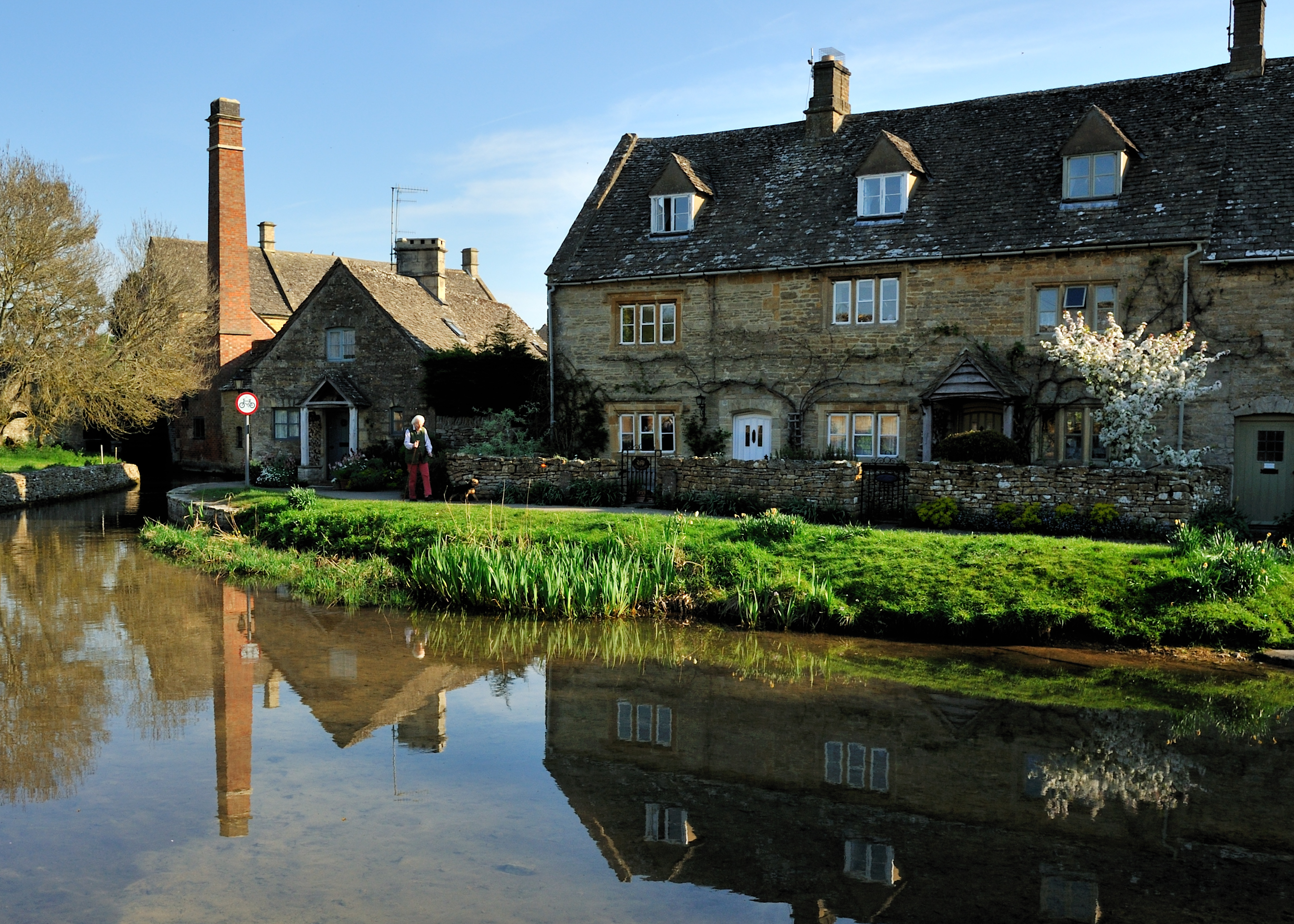

- Location within Gloucestershire
- OS grid reference: SP1638422561
- District: Cotswold
- Shire county: Gloucestershire
- Region: South West
- Country: England
- Sovereign state: United Kingdom
- Post town: CHELTENHAM
- Postcode district: GL54
- Dialling code: 01451
- Police: Gloucestershire
- Fire: Gloucestershire
- Ambulance: South Western
- UK Parliament: North Cotswolds

Lower Slaughter is a village in the Cotswold district of Gloucestershire, England, 4 miles (6.4 km) south west of Stow-on-the-Wold.

The village is built on both banks of the River Eye, a slow-moving stream crossed by two footbridges, which also flows through Lower Slaughter’s twin village Upper Slaughter. At the west end of the village there is a 19th-century water mill with an undershot waterwheel and a chimney for additional steam power. There is a ford where the river widens in the village and several small stone footbridges join the two sides of the community. While the mill is built of red brick most of the 16th and 17th century homes in the village use Cotswold limestone and are adorned with mullioned windows and often with other embellishments such as projecting gables.

The name of the village is derived from the Old English term "slough" meaning "wet land".

== History ==
Lower Slaughter has been inhabited for over 1,000 years. The Domesday Book of 1086 gives the village name as "Sclostre". It further notes that in 1066 and 1086 that the manor was in the sheriff's hands.

The village had a small school by 1863, but it was closed in 1931.

Lower Slaughter Manor, a Grade-II listed house, has stood on the site of today's manor since at least the year 1004. The current house has been added to and altered over many generations, with significant sections dating from the late 17th century. A Norman knight, Sir Philip de Sloitre, was granted land here by William the Conqueror in the 11th century. Lower Slaughter Manor, a Grade-II listed 17th-century house, was granted to Sir George Whitmore in 1611 and remained in his family until 1964. The lords of the manor resided in the property until 1961.

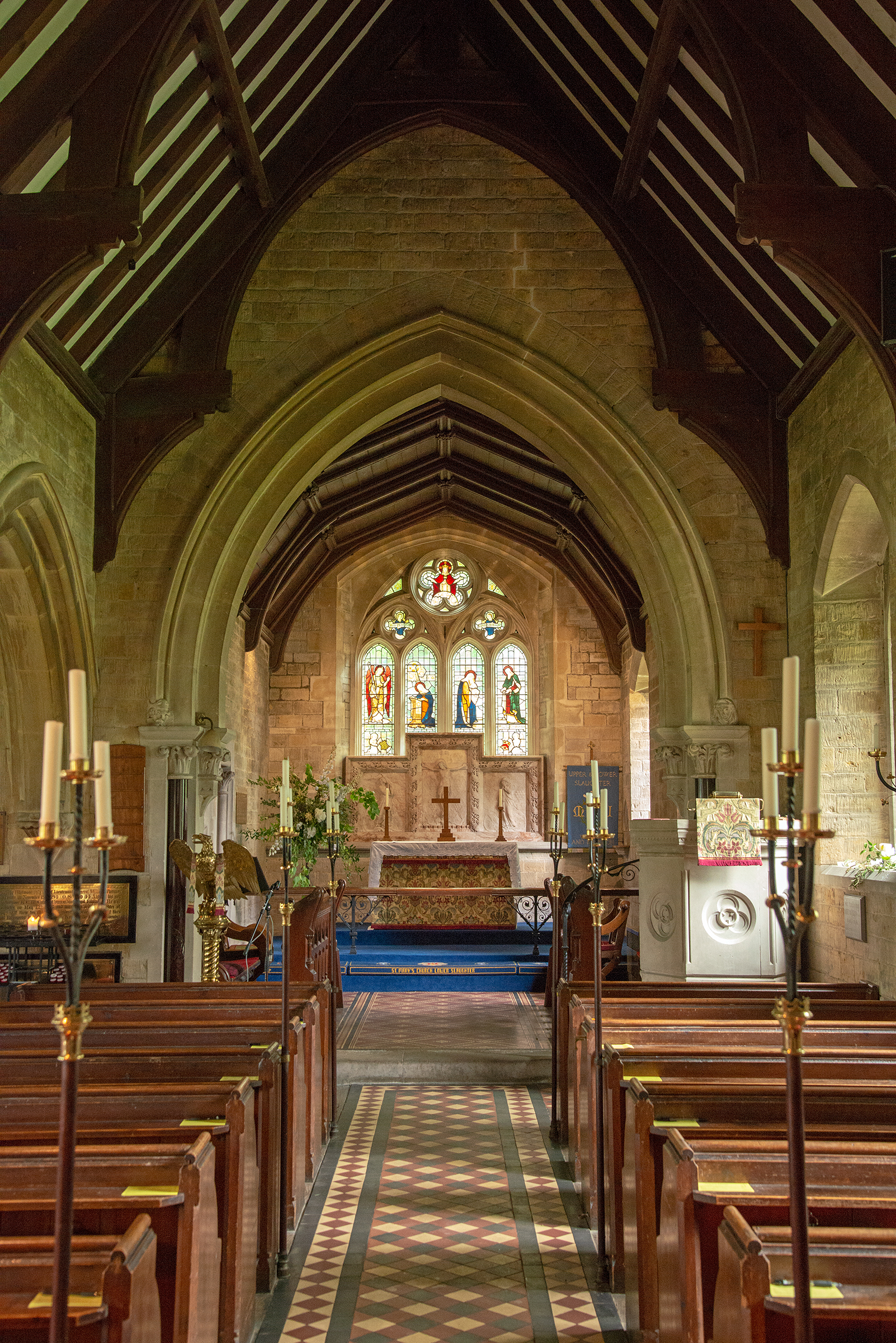
Interior of St Mary's

The 13th-century Anglican parish church, Grade II listed, is dedicated to St Mary the Virgin. Much of the current structure was built in 1867, based on plans by architect Benjamin Ferrey.

== Economy ==
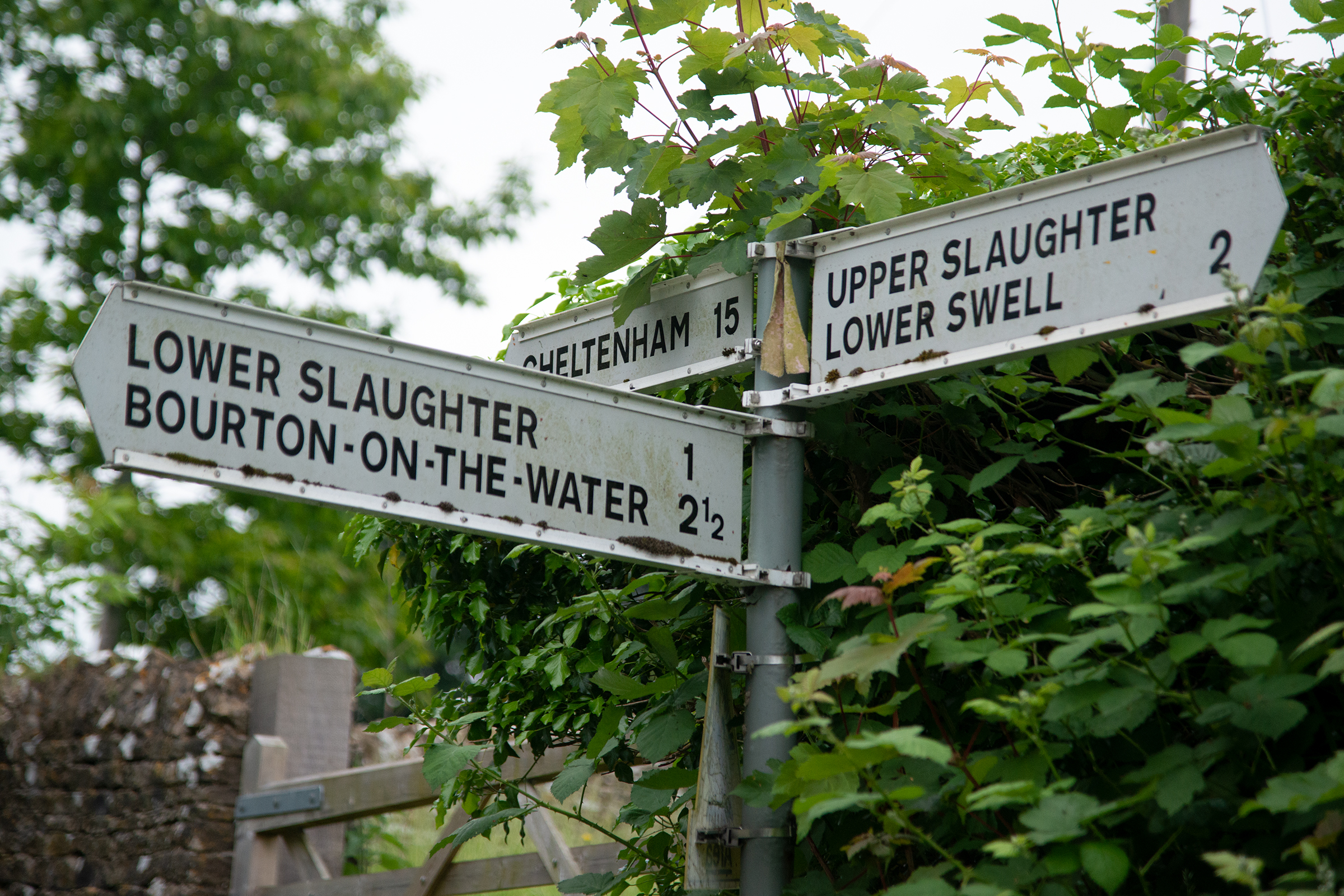
Road signs

Tourism is the primary business in the village, an agricultural area. The 2016 population estimate was 236. Hotels serving Upper and Lower Slaughter include The Slaughters Country Inn, Lords of the Manor and Lower Slaughter Manor. Since the village is served by small roads with narrow lanes, larger vehicles such as tour buses cannot enter. The only obvious tourist attraction is the Old Mill Museum and its River Cafe and Riverside tea room. Tourists are attracted by the many very old and quaint buildings.

In 2013, the Parish Council opposed an icebox tricycle selling ice creams seven days a week, six months of the year, arguing that the trading times were excessive, increased footfall would prevent the grass from growing and children could climb on the trike and fall into the nearby river.

== In popular culture ==
The 1944 film "Tawny Pipit" was filmed here. More recently, parts of Emma (2020 film) were filmed in Lower Slaughter. Locations included the Village Hall, The Manor House and The Old Mill.
