= The stwuns that built George Ridler's oven =

English ballad

"The stwuns that built George Ridler's oven" is a ballad from Gloucestershire that has a double meaning known originally only to the members of The Gloucestershire Society where George Ridler is King Charles I and the oven represents the Cavalier interest.

The following explanation is given by The Gloucestershire Society:

“It is now generally understood that the words of this song have a hidden meaning which was only known to the members of the Gloucestershire Society, whose foundation dates from the year 1657. This was three years before the restoration of Charles II and when the people were growing weary of the rule of Oliver Cromwell. The Society consisted of Loyalists, whose object in combining was to be prepared to aid in the restoration of the ancient constitution of the kingdom whenever a favourable opportunity should present itself. The Cavalier or Royalist party were supported by the Roman Catholics of the old and influential families of the kingdom; and some of the Dissenters, who were disgusted with the treatment they received from Cromwell, occasionally lent them a kind of passive aid. Taking these considerations as the keynote to the song, attempts have been made to discover the meaning which was originally attached to its leading words. It is difficult at the present time to give a clear explanation of all its points. The following, however, is consistent throughout, and is, we believe, correct:--

"The stwuns that built Gaarge Ridler's oven,

And thauy qeum from the Bleakeney's Quaar;

And Gaarge he wur a jolly ould mon,

And his yead it graw'd above his yare."

By "George Ridler" was meant King Charles I. The "oven" was the Cavalier party. The "stwuns" which built the oven, and which "came out of the Blakeney Quaar," were the immediate followers of the Marquis of Worcester, who held out to the last steadfastly for the Royal cause at Raglan Castle, which was not surrendered till 1646, and was, in fact, the last stronghold retained for the King. "His head did grow above his hair" was an allusion to the crown, the head of the State, and which the King wore "above his hair."

"One thing of Gaarge Ridler's I must commend,

And that wur vor a notable theng;

He mead his braags avoore he died,

Wi' any dree brothers his zons zshou'd zeng."

This meant that the King, "before he died," boasted that notwithstanding his present adversity, the ancient constitution of the kingdom was so good and its vitality so great that it would surpass and outlive any other form of government, whether republican, despotic, or protective.

"There's Dick the treble and John the mean

(Let every mon zing in his auwn pleace);

And Gaarge he wur the elder brother,

And therevoore he would zing the beass."

"Dick the treble, Jack the mean, and George the bass " meant the three parts of the British constitution - King, Lords, and Commons. The injunction to "let every man sing in his own place" was intended as a warning to each of the three estates of the realm to preserve its proper position and not to attempt to encroach on each other's prerogative.

"Mine hostess's moid (and her neaum 'twur Nell),

A pretty wench, and I lov'd her well;

I lov'd her well--good reauzon why,

Because zshe lov'd my dog and I."

"Mine hostess's moid" was an allusion to the Queen, who was a Roman Catholic; and her maid, the Church. The singer, we must suppose, was one of the leaders of the party, and his "dog" a companion or faithful official of the Society; and the song was sung on occasions when the members met together socially: and thus, as the Roman Catholics were Royalists, the allusion to the mutual attachment between the "maid" and "my dog and I" is plain and consistent.

"My dog has gotten zitch a trick

To visit moids when thauy be zick;

When thauy be zick and like to die,

Oh, thether gwoes my dog and I."

The "dog" - that is, the official or devoted member of the Society - had "a trick of visiting maids when they were sick." The meaning here was that when any of the members were in distress, or desponding, or likely to give up the Royal cause in despair, the officials or active members visited, consoled, and assisted them.

"My dog is good to catch a hen,

A duck and goose is vood vor men;

And where good company I spy,

Oh, thether gwoes my dog and I."

The "dog," the official or agent of the Society, was "good to catch a hen," a "duck," or a "goose" - that is, any who were well affected to the Royal cause of whatever party; wherever "good company I spy, Oh, thither go my dog and I" - to enlist members into the Society.

"My mwother told I when I wur young,

If I did vollow the strong beer pwoot,

That drenk would pruv my auverdrow,

And meauk me wear a thzreadbare cwoat."

"The good ale-tap" was an allusion, under cover of a similarity in the sound of the words "ale" and "aisle," to the Church, of which it was dangerous at that time to be an avowed follower, and so the members were cautioned that indiscretion would lead to their discovery and "overthrow."

"When I hev dree zixpences under my thumb,

Oh, then I be welcome wherever I qeum

But when I have none, oh, then I pass by,--

'Tis poverty pearts good company."

The allusion here is to those unfaithful supporters of the Royal cause who "welcomed" the members of the Society when it appeared to be prospering, but "parted" from them in adversity, probably referring ironically to those lukewarm and changeable Dissenters who veered about, for and against, as Cromwell favoured or contemned them. Such could always be had wherever there were "three sixpence - under the thumb"; but"poverty" easily parted such "good company."

"When I gwoes dead, as it may hap,

My greauve shall be under the good yeal tap;

In vouled earmes there wool us lie,

Cheek by jowl, my dog and I."

"If I should die," etc.--an expression of the singer's wish that if he should die he may be buried with his faithful companion (as representing the principles of the Society) under the good aisles of the church, thus evincing his loyalty and attachment to the good old constitution and to Church and King even in death.”
