= The Gloucestershire Society =

Charity in Gloucestershire, England

The Gloucestershire Society

The Gloucestershire Society is a charitable society founded on 1 December 1657 by 50 "Gloucestershire Gentlemen that Inhabit within the City of Bristol". It is a registered charity. Its early activities included helping local apprentices. The song "The stwuns that built George Ridler's oven" was sung at meetings causing historians to see the society as a covert royalist organisation but that view is rejected by the society.
