= River Eye, Gloucestershire =

Eye
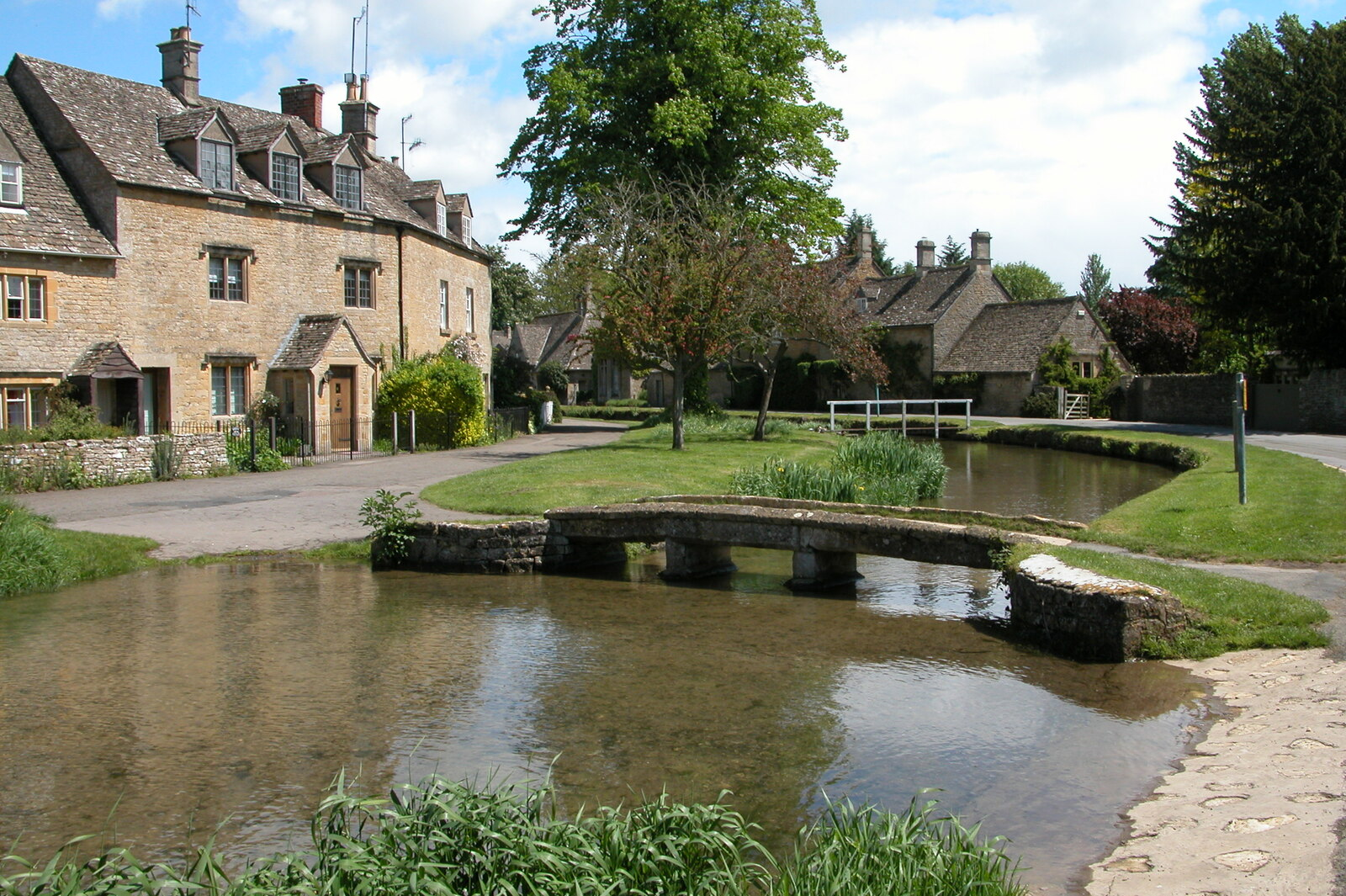
- River Eye at Lower Slaughter

- Location within Gloucestershire

Location
- Country: England
- Region: Gloucestershire

Physical characteristics
- Source: Eyford Park
  - location: 51.929°N 1.785°W
  - elevation: 160 m (520 ft)
- Mouth: River Dikler near Bourton-on-the-Water
  - coordinates: 51.886°N 1.739°W
  - elevation: 130 m (430 ft)
- Length: 7.6 km (4.7 mi)

Basin features
- River system: River Dikler (River Windrush)

The River Eye is a short river in the Cotswold District of Gloucestershire which flows for 7.6 kilometres (4.7 mi) through the villages of Upper Slaughter and Lower Slaughter. The river is home to brown trout.

== Course ==
The Eye rises in a spring in the Cotswold Hills at a height of around 160m in the northern end of the parish of Upper Slaughter. It flows south in its own steep-sided valley through the grounds of Eyford Park, a house built in the early 20th century, with noted formal gardens. Here the river has been dammed at two points to form lakes for the house, known as "Upper Lake" and "The Lake".

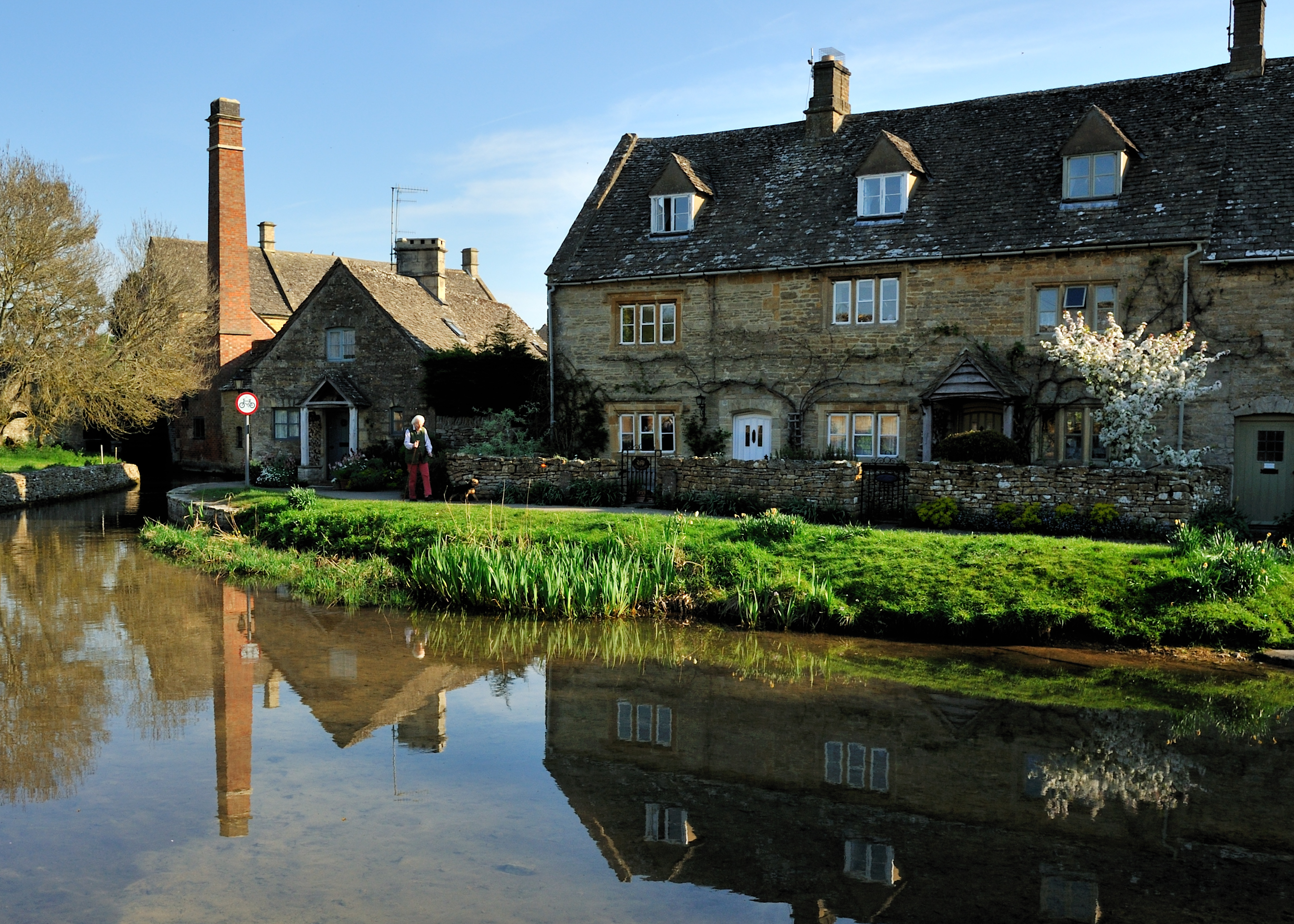
The Old Mill

Crossing the B4068, the river joins the footpath known as "Warden's Way", that runs from Bourton-on-the-Water to Winchcombe and after a kilometre passes St Peter's, parish church of the small village of Upper Slaughter, as it encircles the village to the north and east. Turning south east, it descends into Lower Slaughter after another kilometre passing first under a former water mill. There was a mill listed on the site in the Domesday Book, and it continued to produce flour for the village until the death of the owner in 1958. It is now a shop and museum, housing the machinery of the former mill. The river runs through the heart of the popular tourist village of Lower Slaughter, where it is commonly known as Slaughter Brook, forming a picturesque backdrop to the much-admired cottages of Cotswold stone.

After leaving Lower Slaughter it flows under the Roman Fosse Way at Slaughter Bridge, and forms the boundary between the parishes of Lower Slaughter and Bourton-on-the-Water as it winds between fields used for sheep farming. After running parallel to the River Dikler for a kilometre, it finally empties into the Dikler a kilometre to the east of Bourton-on-the-Water, only two kilometres before the Dikler flows into the River Windrush.

== History ==
The river gives its name to Eyford Park, indicating the presence of a former ford across the river.

== See also ==
- List of rivers of England
