= Swell, Gloucestershire =

Civil parish in Gloucestershire, England

Coordinates: 51°56′00″N 01°44′44″W

Swell
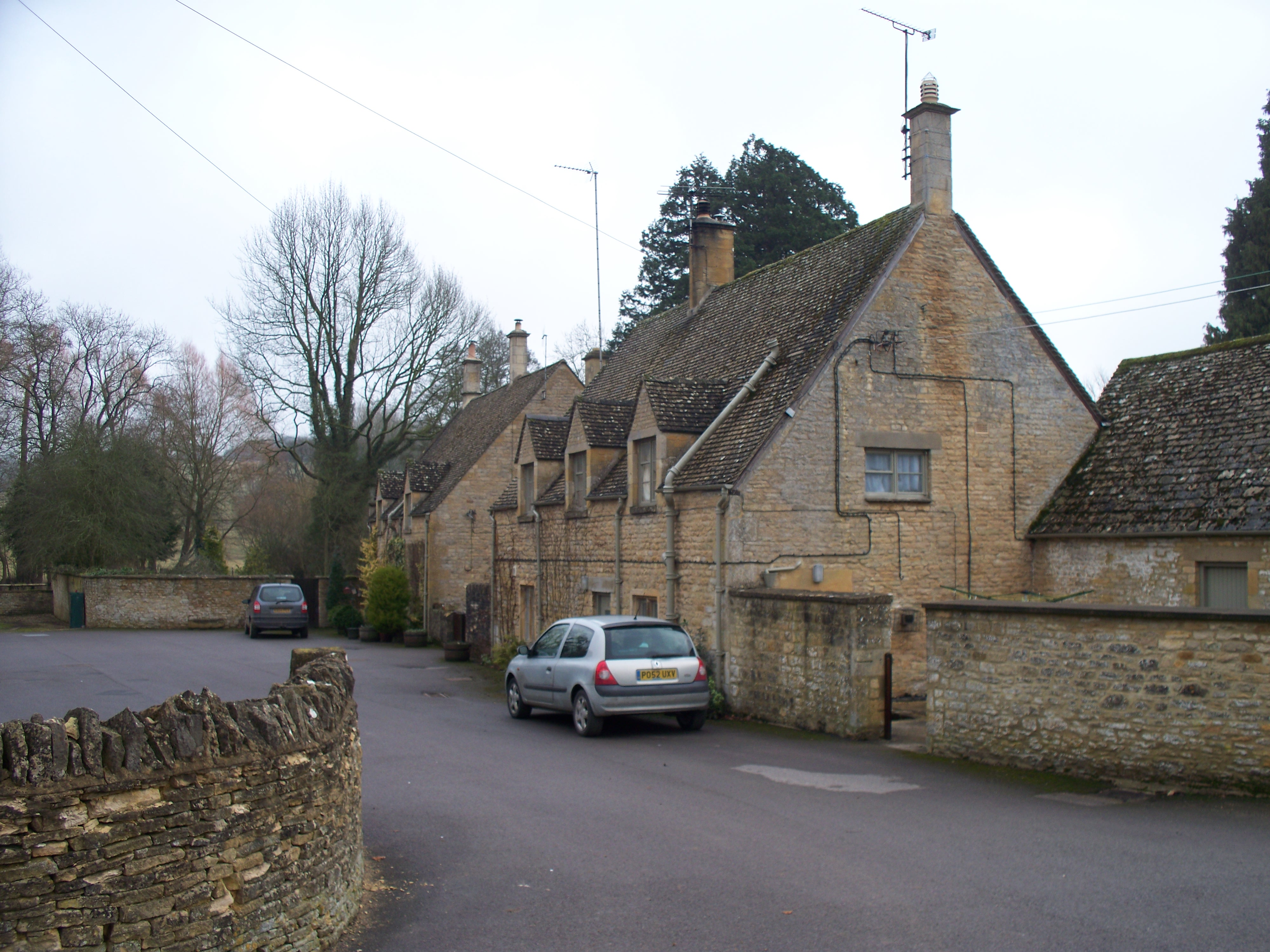
- Bowl Farm, Swell

- Location within Gloucestershire
- Population: 389 (2011 census)
- Civil parish: Swell
- District: Cotswold
- Shire county: Gloucestershire
- Region: South West
- Country: England
- Sovereign state: United Kingdom
- UK Parliament: North Cotswolds

Swell is a civil parish in the Cotswold district, in the county of Gloucestershire, England. The population of the civil parish taken at the 2011 census was 389.

Swell is located in the Cotswold district immediately west of the town of Stow-on-the-Wold. The main settlements are Upper Swell (grid reference SP176268) and Lower Swell (SP173254) both of which are on B-class roads radiating from the town. The Heart of England Way long distance footpath passes through both. Swell has the River Dikler running through it and is also home to a reservoir which is located in Upper Swell. The parish was formed on 1 April 1935 from the parishes of Lower Swell and Upper Swell.

St Mary is a small Norman church situated in Upper Swell. It dates from the 12th century.

The village is the most populous area of 'Three Rivers' electoral ward. This ward starts in the east near to but not in Stow-on-the-Wold and extends to Temple Guiting in the north east. The total population of this ward taken at the 2011 census was 1900.
