= Edmund Chilmead =

English classical scholar (1610–1654)

Edmund Chilmead (1610 – 19 February 1654), wrongly called Edward in various sources, was an English writer and translator active in Oxford during the Civil War and early Commonwealth periods. He is remembered mainly for his scholarly works, including those relating to Byzantine history and to music, and also as a practical musician, a few of his songs surviving in notation. Anthony à Wood described him as "a choice mathematician, a noted critic, and one that understood several tongues, especially the Greek, very well." He was a "Critic" in the academic sense, one who was skilled in the study or analysis of texts. His edition of the Chronographia of John Malalas was his most lasting contribution to scholarship.

== Life ==
=== Chilmead of Stow on the Wold ===
Edmund Chilmead was born the first son of Henry Chillmead, at the parsonage house of Stow-on-the-Wold, Gloucestershire, between 4 and 5 o'clock in the morning of 15 March 1609/10, and was baptized at St Edward's church, Stow on 25 March 1610: the extended entry stands out in this otherwise formulaic register. A brother, John (1611), and Grace Chilmead (1613/14), were baptized there soon afterwards. If Henry Chillmead was ever a clergyman there, the Liber cleri is silent; but Stow historians have called him "rector". William Busted was presented to Stow rectory in 1603 by the lay patron Edmund Chamberlain (1560-1634) (manorial lord of Maugersbury, a hamlet of Stow), who in that year purchased the reputed manor of Stow-on-the Wold, and had the advowson. Busted's incumbency was interrupted at least once: he was re-instituted under Crown patronage as vicar or rector of Stow in 1613. Other Chilmead baptisms at Stow include Henry (July 1622) and Sara (August 1624), while Geoffry Chilmead, son of Henry, born at Maugersbury c. 1631, attended Stow school and entered Sidney Sussex College, Cambridge a sizar in 1653, aged 22, later becoming vicar of South Benfleet and curate of Bowers Gifford in Essex.

More likely, Henry Chilmead was a bailiff to Edmund Chamberlaine. His children's names, Edmund, John and Grace (Chilmead), mirror Chamberlaine's children and wife. He acted with Simon Egerton (Chamberlaine's cousin, and overseer of his brother Sir John Chamberlaine's will, 1617) in a Chancery action concerning a bond. The manorial rights to the markets and rents at Stow, disputed by the town bailiffs and burgesses in 1606-07, remained with Chamberlain: through succeeding inquiries, Chilmead gave evidence in 1621 when Chamberlaine challenged the townsmen (including Richard Hill and William Busted). Between 1613 and 1621 Chamberlain himself (attended by his family and servants) was in debtor's prison in London, having been surety for the debts of his brother, Sir John, to some £14,000.

In November 1623 Henry Chilmead, yeoman of Stow-on-the-Wold, brought suit in Star Chamber against Richard Hill of Stow, yeoman, and Charles Townsend, a King's Bench attorney, for having procured Chilmead's arrest by making a false return to a warrant issued "on a bond given by him on behalf of his master, Edward Chamberleyn, Esq". In 1631 Chamberlaine, endowing the marriage of his son John with his manors and estates, specifically excluded the messuage with two virgates of land (i.e. about 60 acres) in Maugersbury then in the tenure of Henry Chilmead, which he later sold privately. Making his will in April 1634, Chamberlaine gave ten pounds to Stow church, five pounds to the poor, and ten pounds to Henry Chilmead, who, next after John Chamberlaine, witnessed the will. In 1637 Henry Chilmeade was a bailiff to John Chamberlaine (died February 1667/68), Edmund's son and heir.

The Grammar School at Stow was re-edified adjacent to the churchyard in 1594, and further endowed in 1604, by Richard Shepham, a Warden of the Merchant Taylors in London, and received its Charter in 1612. Sir John Chamberlaine (Trinity College, Oxford) and his brother Edmund (Magdalen College, Oxford) had entered Oxford University together in 1578/79, and probably their younger half-brother Thomas (Gloucester Hall) in 1582. Edmund's son, John Chamberlaine, matriculated from Magdalen College in 1624, and entered the Inner Temple in 1626. There lay the path of example and influence which led Edmund and John Chilmead to Magdalen soon afterwards.

=== Oxford career ===
Edmund Chilmead studied at Magdalen College, Oxford, where he graduated B.A. in February 1628-29, becoming a clerk from 1629 to 1634: He received his M.A. on 10 December 1631 as from Christ Church College, Oxford, and was ordained a deacon on 23 December 1632 (as M.A. of Magdalen College): between 1632 and 1634 Magdalen College made payments to "M[agist]ro Chilmead" of £7.12s., 10s., and £2.18s. for copying music-books for the use of the choir, some of which have survived. He was a chaplain of Christ Church in 1641. His brother John (son of Henry) followed closely in his footsteps, matriculating from Magdalen on 30 October 1629, aged 18, graduating B.A. on 12 November 1631, and receiving ordination to deacon (as B.A. of Magdalen) on 23 September 1632. On the death of Edmund Chamberlaine in 1634, the advowson of Stow-on-the-Wold church was sold to Sir Robert Berkeley and Dr Samuel Fell, Dean of Christ Church College; and when William Busted died in 1642, Dr Fell, for the Dean and Chapter of Christ Church, presented Rowland Wilde (M.A., 1627, of that College) to succeed him as rector.

The song book (with parts combined) compiled by the Christ Church organist and Oxford Professor of Music Edward Lowe includes Chilmead's music for settings of "A Pastoral Ode" (Coy Coelia dost thou see) by Thomas Randolph (fols 68v-70v), with a reply and a chorus, "A Lover's Passion" (Is shee not wondrous fayre?) by Thomas Carew (fols 70v-71r), and the song Why, this is a sport, from Ben Jonson's The Gypsies Metamorphosed (fols 71v-72v). His critical interest in the nature of sound is shown in his unpublished treatise De Sonis. This took the form of twenty inquiries on this theme, pertaining to the second and third centuries of experiments in Francis Bacon's Sylva Sylvarum of 1626.

During the mid-1630s he produced his catalogue of the Greek manuscripts of the Bodleian Library (1636). A translation of Hues's Tractatus de Globis (from Latin), published in 1639, has John Chilmead's name on the title-page as M.A. of Christ Church, but is usually attributed to Edmund. (Hues was buried at Christ Church in 1632.) Edmund's translation of Ferrand's Erotomania (from the French), a work concerned with lovesickness as melancholy, was published in 1640. At Christ Church, Edmund was a friend and scholarly companion of his contemporary John Gregory, the brilliant but reclusive orientalist. After Gregory's withdrawal from Oxford, and his premature death in March 1646/47, Chilmead came into possession of his translations from Greek into Latin of the De gentibus Indiae et Bragmanibus attributed to Palladius of Galatia, the De Moribus Brachmanorum attributed to St Ambrosius, and the anonymous De Brachmanibus, concerning the "Brahmans", which were eventually put forth by their patron (Sir) Edward Bysshe (the younger, Clarenceux), under his own name in 1665.

=== Ancient music ===
The treatise De Sonis, mentioned by Wood, was written in Oxford days and remained in MS. Two short original works by Chilmead relating to Greek music and prosody were later discovered by Dr Edward Bernard (who made an abstract of Chilmead's catalogue of the Barocci manuscripts at the Bodleian), or by Henry Dodwell (here Hody differs from Wood), among the papers of Archbishop Ussher (died 1656) in Ireland, and were published at Oxford in 1672 as an appendix to the student edition of works of Aratus of Soli and Eratosthenes, ancient Greek texts upon geographical and astronomical subjects. They included Chilmead's annotations to the Odes of Dionysius supplementary to the καταστερισμος (katasterismoi) of Eratosthenes: he also made Latin translations from those Odes, which were omitted from the edition, the publishers preferring to keep their ancient authors in Greek. His (Latin) Treatise, which "contains a designation of the ancient genera agreeable to the sentiments of Boetius, with a general enumeration of the modes; ...follow[s] the Odes, with the Greek musical characters, which Chilmead has rendered in the notes of Guido's scale..."

=== Chronographia of John Malalas ===
Chilmead's most important labour, however, was the preparation of the editio princeps of the Byzantine Greek text, with parallel Latin translation, of the Chronological History of John Malala (from the unique codex in the Bodleian Library). Begun at Oxford before the outbreak of the Civil War, this work had to wait until 1691 for its publication. Chilmead's translation was in the possession of Edward Bysshe in 1654: Bysshe remarked, "I have that book, which for a whole year now has wanted a printer: that very learned man Edmund Chilmead translated it, whose early death is the more to be lamented, in that it will deprive us of the works so keenly looked for from such a mind".

In 1674 Humphrey Prideaux wrote to John Ellis about the project:

"[Our printers] are likewise upon a designe of printeing Johannes Antiochenus Malela, a booke of great antiquity, and very usefull for cronologers; the copy whereof is noewhere extant but in our publick library. The B. of Armagh first tooke notice of it and perswaded the University to print it: and in order thereto Mr. Chilmead was imployed to transcribe it and make a Latin interpretation of it, but the war comeing on, the worke was interrupted and never since thought of, till of late, it being made use of by severall of our cronologers and antiquarys, we are continually pestered with letters from forrain parts to set it forth, out of a conceit that rare things ly hid therein, wereas more than halfe the booke is stuffed with ridiculous and incredible lys; and, although there be something of good use contained therein, yet they are not of such number or value as to make any recompense for the rest of his booke, which is intolerable. It was writ about 400 years after Christ by an Antiochean, in Greek. The copy is very much moth-eaten and extremely difficult to be made perfect. Some on must be forced to cast away his time in the unprofitable worke of repaireinge it."

According to Humphrey Hody and Anthony à Wood, Chilmead intended to preface his Malala with a treatise by John Gregory, "Observationes in Loca quaedam excerpta ex Ioh. Malalae Chronographia" (which survived in manuscript in the Oxford Public Library). Finally in 1691 the text was issued with the Imprimatur of Jonathan Edwards, Vice-Chancellor of the University. John Gregory's introduction was set aside, and Chilmead's texts appeared with his own annotations, with lengthy prolegomena by Humphrey Hody, and with a celebrated essay by Richard Bentley (in the form of a Letter to John Mill) explaining his own contributions and emendations to the text. All of this apparatus, including Chilmead's annotations, was included both in Ludwig Dindorf's introduction and edition of the text for Niebuhr's 1831 Corpus of Authors of Byzantine History, and together with Dindorf's introduction and text in Migne's Patrologia Graeca (Vol. 97) published in 1863.

=== Last years in London ===
Christ Church College became a principal seat of royalist rule during the middle years of the 1640s. Following the surrender of Oxford and the parliamentary visitation, in 1648 Chilmead was ejected from the University in the general expulsion of royalist sympathisers: the Register in 1651 records that he had been "removed long since upon statutable grounds". Deprived of his living, Chilmead relocated to London, where he made an income by writing and publishing translations, and by the formation of a musical society which met at the Black Horse in Aldersgate Street, formerly the publishing-house of Thomas East (died 1609).

His translations from Leon of Modena's work on Jewish customs (from Italian) and of Jacques Gaffarel's astrological work Curiositez (from French), perhaps written or begun in Oxford, were both published in London in 1650, the latter opening with a dedication to Edward Bysshe as his "much honoured Patron", for whose many favours he acknowledged his debt of service. In a similar way, John Gurgany in 1649 dedicated John Gregory's posthumous tracts to Bysshe as Gregory's patron, alluding to earlier years in Oxford. Their Christ Church colleague David Whitford, also, called Bysshe "the asylum and refuge of the afflicted and needy." Chilmead was entrusted with the final edits and corrections to the translation (from Greek) of Procopius's History of the Warres of the Emperour Justinian made by Sir Henry Holcroft ("by whom he had been exhibited to", noted Wood). Holcroft died in 1650: the work was published in 1653, the preface to that first edition explaining Chilmead's involvement.

Anthony à Wood attributed the translation of Tommaso Campanella's Discourse on the Spanish Monarchy (from Latin), published 1654, to Chilmead. The original work proposed means towards world dominion under a Spanish Catholic imperium: the English translation, made with a view to expose that threatening ambition, was reportedly brought to publication after Chilmead's death by William Prynne, a virulent Puritan. A recent study showed that Prynne made use of and distorted this text to foment anti-Catholic feeling, thereby casting a question over Chilmead's involvement with it.

Chilmead died aged nearly 44 on 19 February 1653/54 in London, and was buried in the churchyard of St Botolph's Aldersgate two days later.

== Works ==
- He produced a catalogue of the Greek manuscripts in the Bodleian Library, Catalogus Manuscriptorum Graecorum in Bib. Bod. pro Ratione Auctorum Alphabeticus, MS anno 1636.
- De Musica antiqua Graeca and Annotationes in Odas Dionysii, two short works by Chilmead, were first published at the end of the Oxford 1672 edition of Aratus of Soli.
- De Sonis, fully entitled An examination of certain experiments in the second and third centuries of lord Bacon's Natural History, touching the nature of sounds, a manuscript treatise on the nature of sound.
- He produced the editio princeps of the Greek Chronographia of Malalas, with a parallel Latin translation. According to Prideaux, it was commissioned by the University and undertaken by Chilmead before the Civil War. Chilmead's notes on the Greek historians, included in this edition, exist in a manuscript in his own hand.

He translated:

- Robert Hues's Tractatus de Globis Coelesti et Terrestri et eorum Usu of 1592/94, with the annotations of Pontanus, as A Learned Treatise of Globes, 1639.
- Jacques Ferrand's Traité de l'Essence et Guérison de l'Amour ou de la Mélancholie Erotique (of 1610, banned, re-published 1623), as Erotomania, or A Treatise Discoursing of the Essence, Causes, Symptomes, Prognosticks, and Cure of Love or Erotique Melancholy, 1640.
- the Historia de' Riti Hebraici of Leon of Modena of 1637, as The History of the Rites, Customes, and Manner of Life, of the present Jews, throughout the World, 1650.
- the Curiositez Inouyes of Jacques Gaffarel, as Unheard-of Curiosities Concerning the Talismanical Sculpture of the Persians, 1650. This work shows him as a clerical defender of astrology.
- the De Monarchia Hispanica, Discursus of Tommaso Campanella as A Discourse Touching the Spanish Monarchy, 1654. (attributed by Wood)

and other works.

In addition,

- He made the final edits and corrections to Sir Henry Holcroft's translation of the History of the Wars of Justinian by Procopius, printed 1653.
