= Mail order =

Buying of goods or services by mail delivery

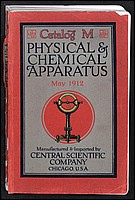
Cover of a mail-order catalogue for scientific equipment

Mail order is the buying of goods or services by mail delivery. The buyer places an order for the desired products with the merchant through some remote methods such as:

- Sending an order form in the mail
- Placing an order by telephone call
- Placing an order with a travelling agent
- Filling in an order form on a website or mobile app — if the product information is also mainly obtained online rather than via a paper catalogue or via television, this mail-order model is called online shopping or e-commerce

Then, the products are delivered to the customer. The products are usually delivered directly to an address supplied by the customer, such as a home address, but occasionally the orders are delivered to a nearby retail location for the customer to pick up. Some merchants also allow the goods to be shipped directly to a third party consumer, which is an effective way to send a gift to an out-of-town recipient. Some merchants deliver the goods directly to the customer through their travelling agents. Payment may be made by installment.

A mail order catalogue (or catalog) is a publication containing a list of general merchandise from a company. Companies who publish and operate mail order catalogues are referred to as cataloguers within the industry. Cataloguers buy or manufacture goods then market those goods to prospects (prospective customers). Cataloguers may "rent" names from list brokers or cooperative databases. The catalogue itself is published in a similar fashion as any magazine publication and distributed through a variety of means, usually via a postal service and the internet.

Sometimes supermarket products do mail order promotions, whereby people can send in the UPC plus shipping and handling to get a product made especially for the company.

== History ==
=== Early catalogues ===
In 1498, the publisher Aldus Manutius of Venice printed a catalogue of the Greek books he was printing, with their sale prices. In 1667, the English gardener William Lucas published a seed catalogue, which he mailed to his customers to inform them of his prices. Catalogues spread to British America, where Benjamin Franklin is believed to have been the first cataloguer. In 1744 he produced a catalogue of scientific and academic books. In 1833, Antonio Fattorini started a mail order watch club in Bradford, which would eventually transform into Empire Stores.

=== First mail order ===
Pryce-Jones could only dream of the impact his entrepreneurial vision would have on the world when he was selling Welsh flannel to Queen Victoria and Florence Nightingale in the late 1800s. Jones is credited as being the pioneer of a global mail order industry now worth about £75bn. Forget the internet and delivery drivers, Pryce-Jones used the superhighway of the day—the railway and parcel post.

— "The mail-order pioneer who started a billion-pound industry", BBC News, December 2020.

The Welsh entrepreneur Pryce Pryce-Jones set up the first mail-order company in 1861. Starting off as an apprentice to a local draper in Newtown, Wales, he took over the business in 1856 and renamed it the Royal Welsh Warehouse, selling local Welsh flannel.

The establishment of the Uniform Penny Post in 1840, and the extension of the railway network, helped Pryce-Jones to eventually turn his small rural concern into a company with global renown. Customers were able to order by mail for the first time—this following the creation of the modern postal service and the invention of the postage stamp (Penny Black) where there was a charge of one penny for carriage and delivery between any two places in the United Kingdom irrespective of distance—and the goods were delivered throughout the UK via the newly created railway system.

In 1861, Pryce-Jones hit upon a unique method of selling his wares. He distributed catalogues of his wares across the country, allowing people to choose the items they wished and order them via post; he would then dispatch the goods to the customer via the railways, promising next-day delivery. It was an ideal way of meeting the needs of customers in isolated rural locations who were either too busy or unable to get into Newtown to shop directly. This was the world's first mail order business, an idea which would change the nature of retail in the coming century.

The further expansion of the railways in the years that followed allowed Pryce Jones to greatly expand his customer base and his business grew rapidly. He supplied his products to an impressive variety of famous clientele, including Florence Nightingale and Queen Victoria, the Princess of Wales and royal households across Europe. He also began exporting drapery to the US and British colonies, amassing 200,000 customers around the UK and the world.

One of his most popular products was the Euklisia Rug, the forerunner of the modern sleeping bag, which Pryce-Jones exported around the world, at one point landing a contract with the Russian Army for 60,000 rugs. By 1880, he had more than 100,000 customers in the UK alone and his success was rewarded in 1887 with a knighthood.

=== In North America ===
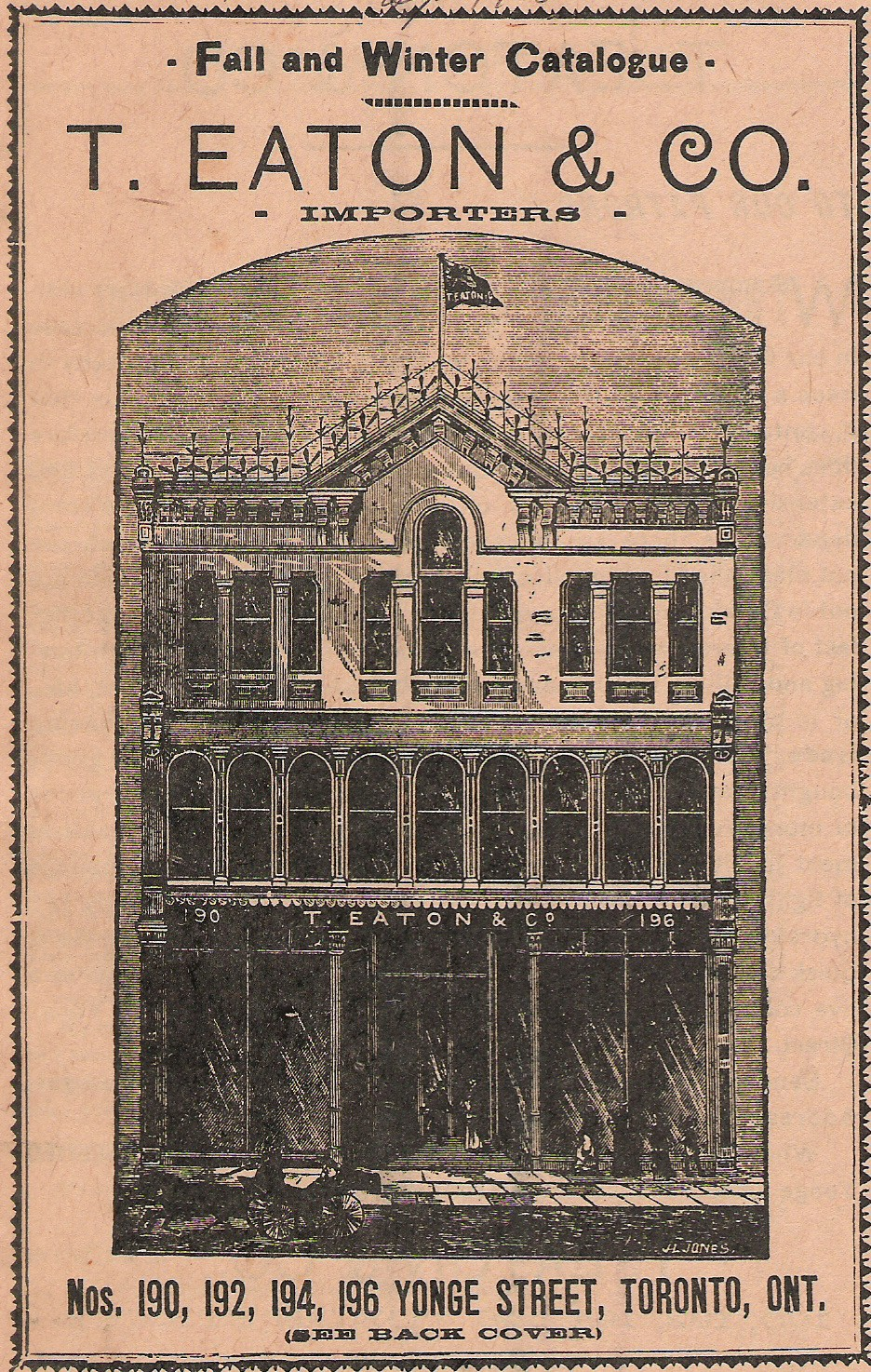
The cover of the first Eaton's catalogue, published in 1884. The Eaton's catalogue would continue to be published until 1976.

In 1845, Tiffany's Blue Book was the first mail-order catalogue in the United States.

In 1872, Aaron Montgomery Ward of Chicago produced a mail-order catalogue for his Montgomery Ward mail order business. By buying goods and then reselling them directly to customers, Aaron Montgomery Ward was consequently removing the middlemen at the general store and to the benefit of the customer, lowering the prices drastically.

His first catalogue was a single sheet of paper with a price list, 8 by 12 inches, showing the merchandise for sale and ordering instructions. Montgomery Ward identified a market of merchant-wary farmers in the Midwest. Within two decades, his single-page list of products grew into a 540-page illustrated book selling over 20,000 items.

From about 1921 to 1931, Ward sold prefabricated kit houses, called Wardway Homes, by mail order.

Hammacher Schlemmer is the earliest still surviving mail-order business, established by Alfred Hammacher in New York City in 1848. Offering mechanic's tools and builder's hardware, its first catalogue was published in 1881.

T. Eaton Co. Limited was founded in 1869 in Toronto by Timothy Eaton, an Irish immigrant. The first Eaton's catalogue was a 34-page booklet issued in 1884. As Eaton's grew, so did the catalogue. By 1920, Eaton's operated mail order warehouses in Winnipeg, Toronto and Moncton to serve its catalogue customers. Catalogue order offices were also established throughout the country, with the first opening in Oakville in 1916.

==== Sears ====
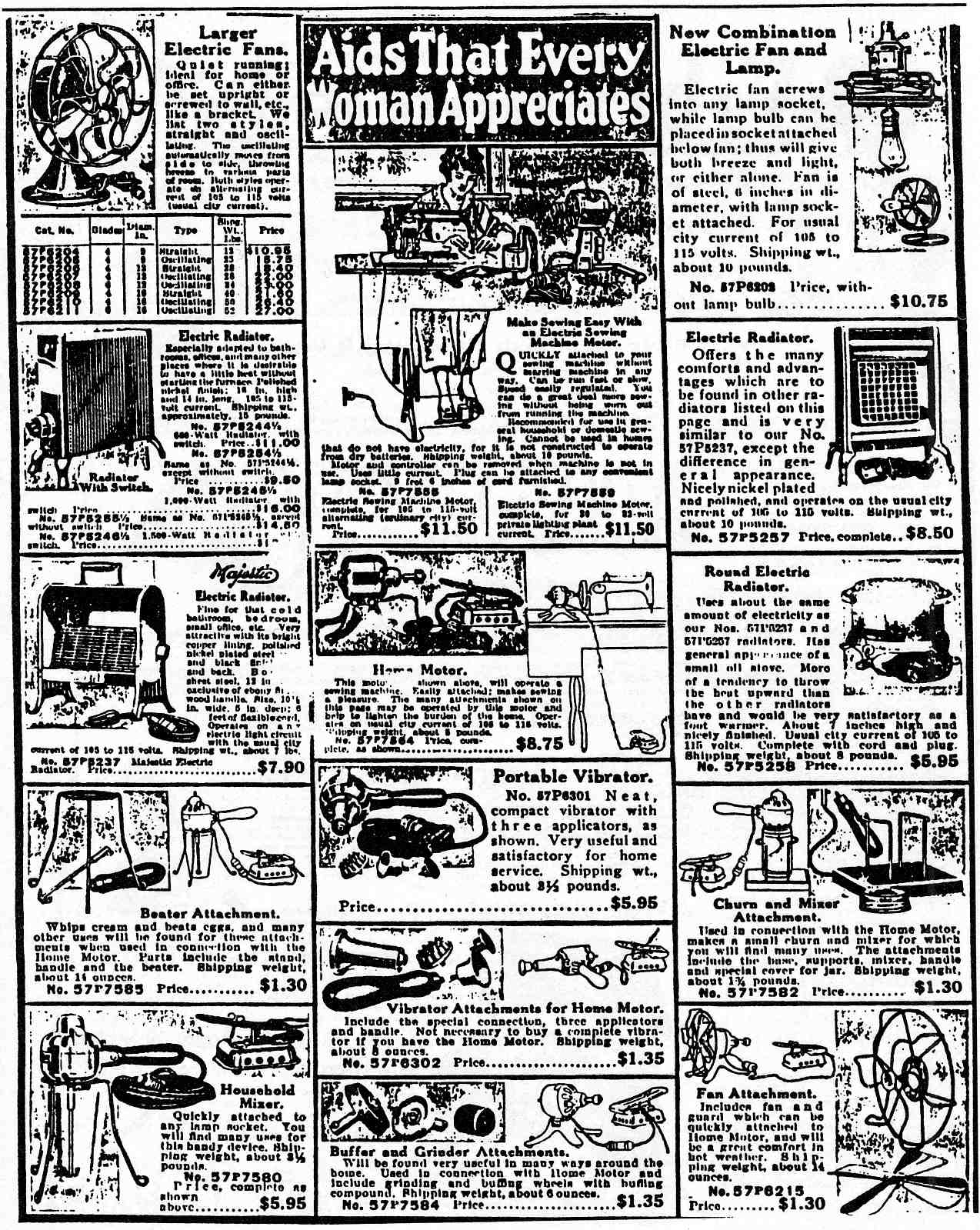
Sears, Roebuck and Company catalogue, 1918

Richard Warren Sears started a business selling watches through mail order catalogues in Redwood Falls, Minnesota, in 1888. By 1894, the Sears catalogue had grown to 322 pages, featuring sewing machines, bicycles, sporting goods, automobiles (produced from 1905–1915 by Lincoln Motor Car Works of Chicago, not related to the current Ford Motor Company brand of the same name) and a host of other new items.

Organizing the company so it could handle orders on an economical and efficient basis, Chicago clothing manufacturer Julius Rosenwald became a part-owner in 1895. By the following year, dolls, refrigerators, stoves and groceries had been added to the catalog. Sears, Roebuck and Co. soon developed a reputation for high quality products and customer satisfaction. By 1895, the company was producing a 532-page catalogue with the largest variety of items that anybody at the time could have imagined. "In 1893, the sales topped 400,000 dollars. Two years later they exceeded 750,000 dollars."

In 1906 Sears opened its catalogue plant and the Sears Merchandise Building Tower. And by that time, the Sears catalogue had become known in the industry as "the Consumers' Bible". In 1933, Sears, Roebuck and Co. produced the first of its famous Christmas catalogues known as the "Sears Wishbook", a catalogue featuring toys and gifts and separate from the annual Christmas catalogue.

From 1908 to 1940, Sears also sold kit houses by mail order, selling 70,000 to 75,000 such homes, many of which are still lived in today.

=== Industrialization ===
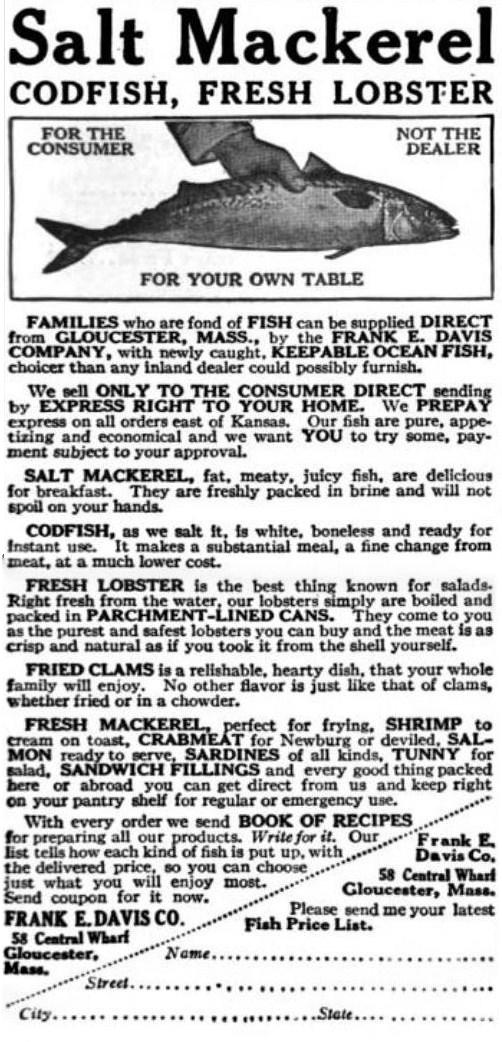
The Outlook, American magazine advertisement from 1916 offering mail delivery of fish and seafood

Pryce Pryce-Jones and Aaron Montgomery Ward created a global network through mail order catelogues covering a wide range of products. Mail order brought privacy and individuality into the retail industry. The mail order catalogue industry is worth approximately 100 billion dollars and generates over $2 trillion in sales.

==== Moores ====
Sir John Moores was a British businessman and philanthropist most famous for the founding of the Littlewoods retail company that was located in Liverpool, England. Moores became a millionaire through the creation of the Littlewood Pool, one of the best-known names in sports gambling in England.

In January 1932, Moores was able to disengage himself sufficiently from the pools to start up Littlewoods Mail Order Store. This was followed on July 6, 1937 by the opening of the first Littlewoods department store in Blackpool. By the time World War II started there were 25 Littlewoods stores across the UK and over 50 by 1952.

The first Littlewoods catalogue was published in May 1932 with 168 pages. Its motta was: "We hoist our Flag in the Port of Supply, and right away we sail to the Ports of Demand—the Homes of the People. We intend to help the homely folk of this country help them to obtain some of the profits made by manufacturing and trading... to save money on things they must have. This Catalogue is our Ship... staffed by an All-British crew... You won't find sleepy, old-fashioned goods carried in the LITTLEWOODS ship. Only the newest of the new goods—honest, British-made merchandise."

With the success of the catalogue business, Moores moved his business four times to larger buildings in 1932. Moores sailed to America to look at the operations of Montgomery Ward and Sears and Roebuck. By 1936, the business had hit the 4 million pound mark, making Moores a millionaire a second time over, by mail order.

==== Penney ====
James Cash Penney started his first retail store in 1902 in Kemmerer, Wyoming. By 1925, J.C. Penney had 674 stores generating sales of $91 million. In 1962 J.C. Penney bought Wisconsin based General Merchandise Company with discount stores and a mail-order operation. Thus J.C. Penney entered the mail order catalogue business. J.C. Penney, a latecomer in catalogue operations, was different from many of its competitors because it had a large retail store base before launching into the mail-order business. The first J.C. Penney catalogue was mailed the next year in 1963. Customers could order from the catalogue inside J.C. Penney stores in eight states. The J.C. Penney Catalog Distribution Center was located in Milwaukee.

Catalogues through the ages

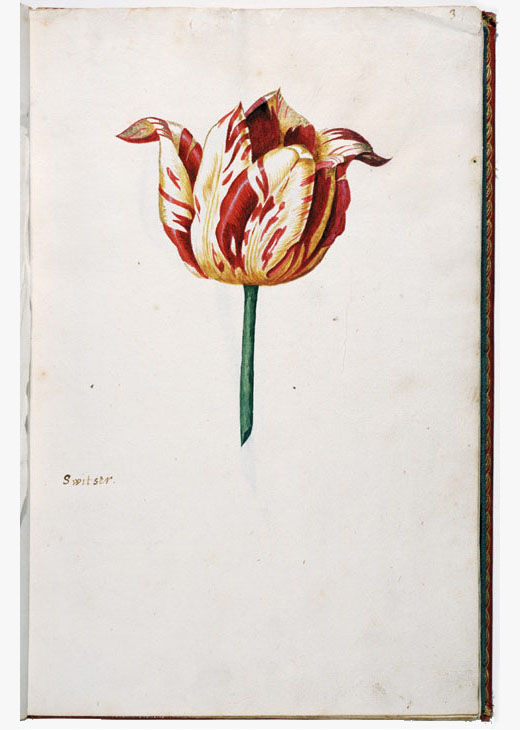
Hand-painted page from a Tulip Catalogue, 1630s

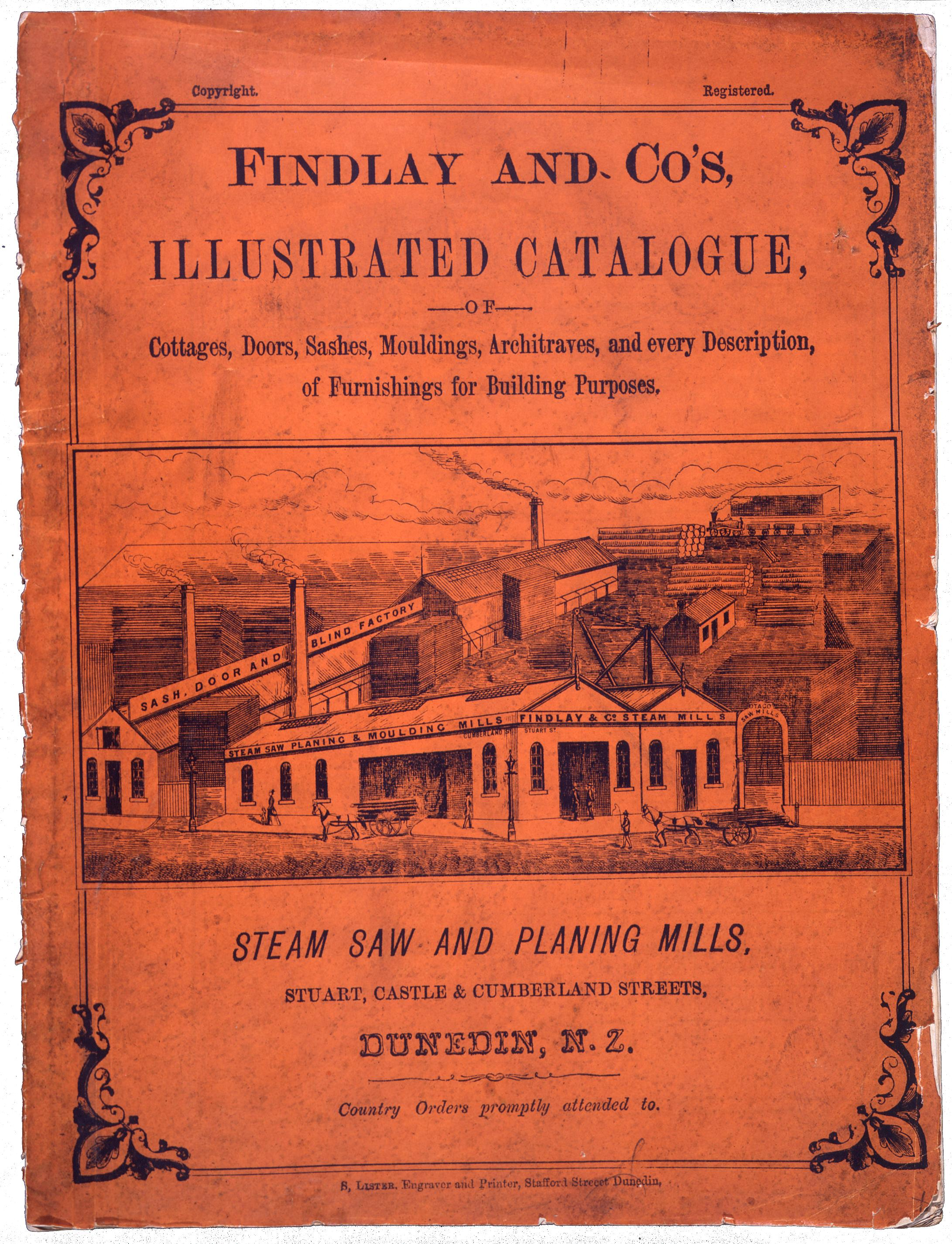
Cover of Findlay and Co's Illustrated Catalogue of Cottages, Doors, Sashes, Mouldings, Architraves, and Every Description of Furnishings for Building Purposes, 1874

Illustrated Catalogue of Cottage Organs, J. Estey & Company, Vermont, 1875

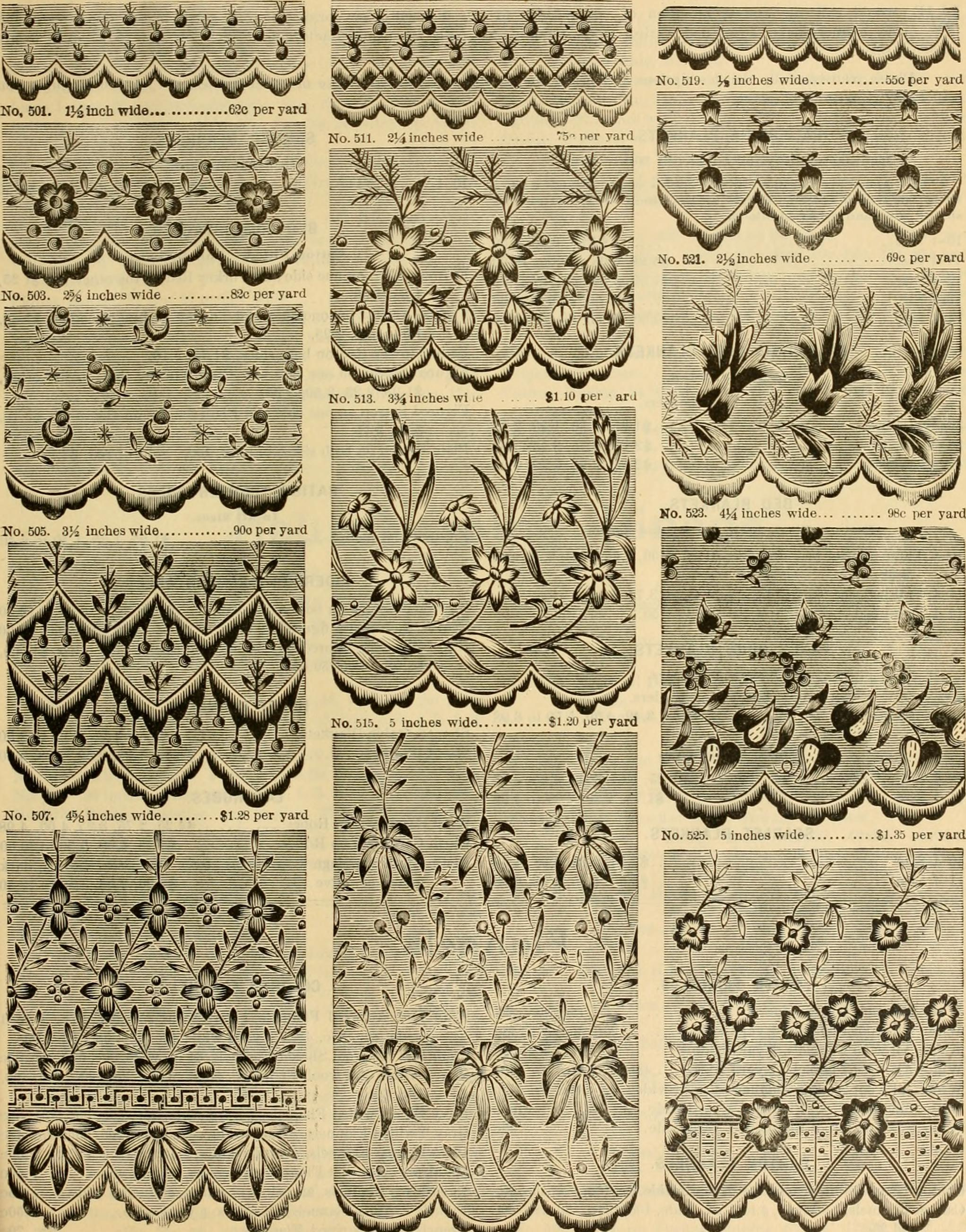
Fashion Catalogue, H. O'Neill and Co., 1890

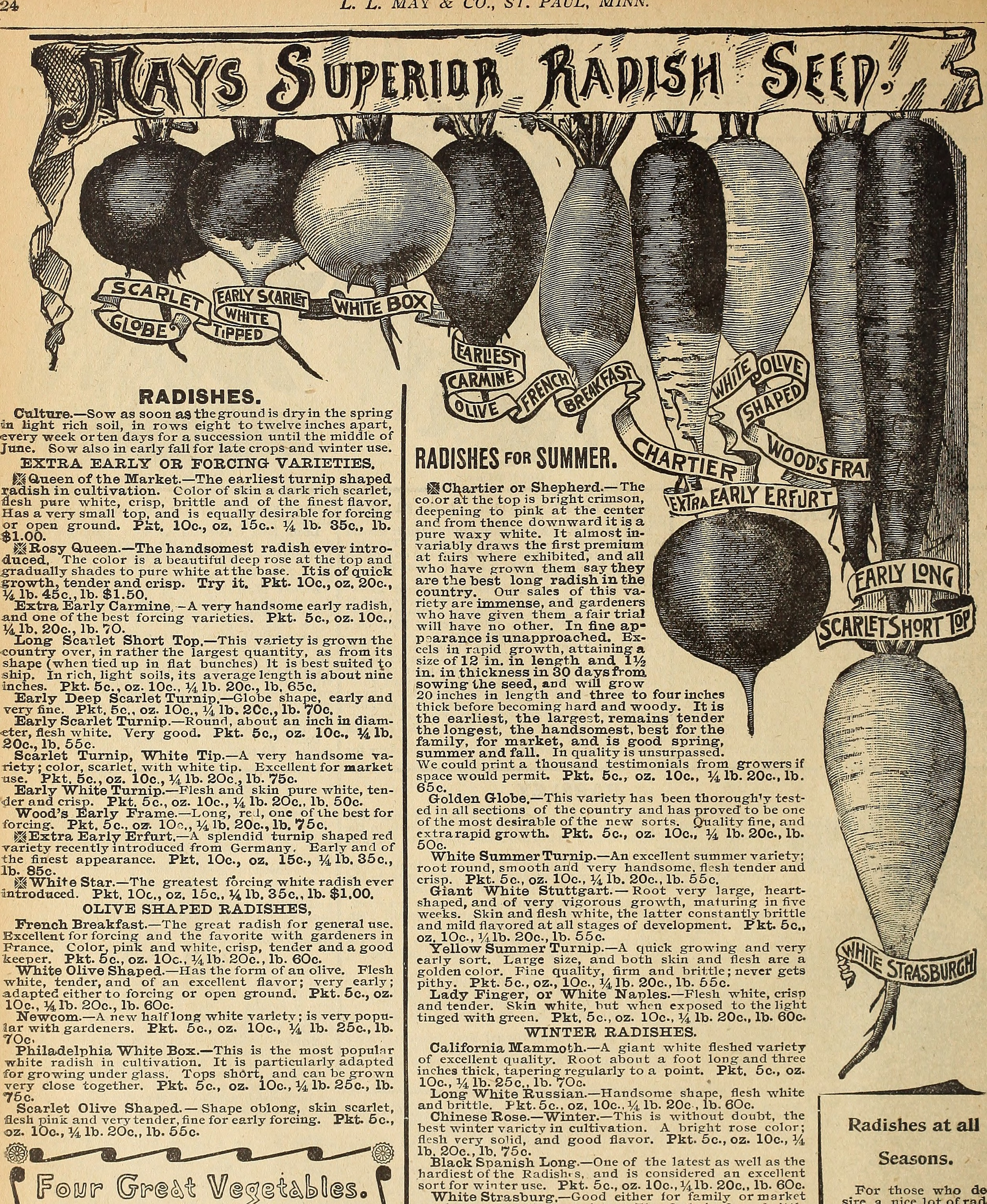
Page from Catalogue of Seeds, Plants, Bulbs and Fruits, 1894

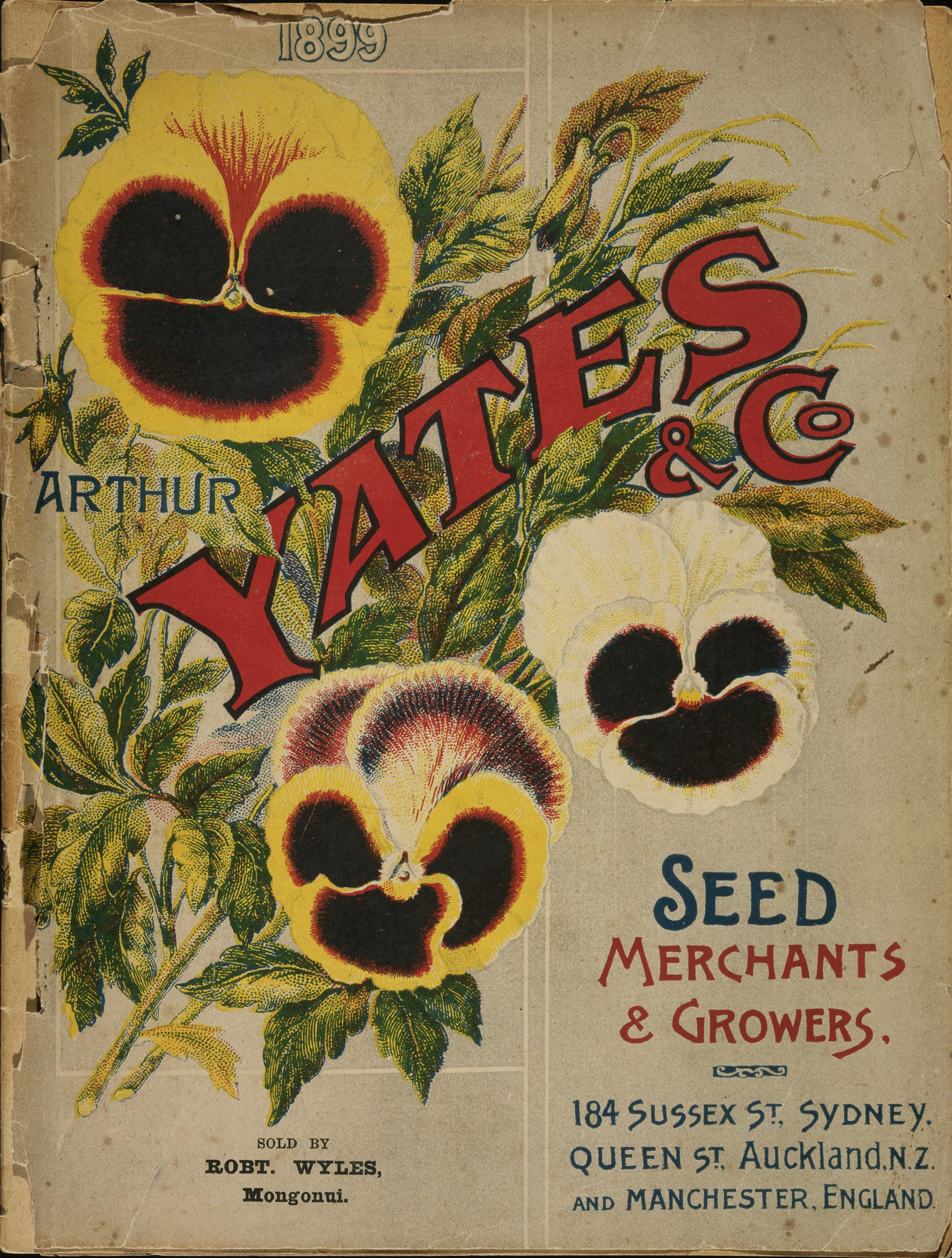
Cover of Arthur Yates and Co.'s Nursery and Seed Catalogue, Auckland, NZ, 1899

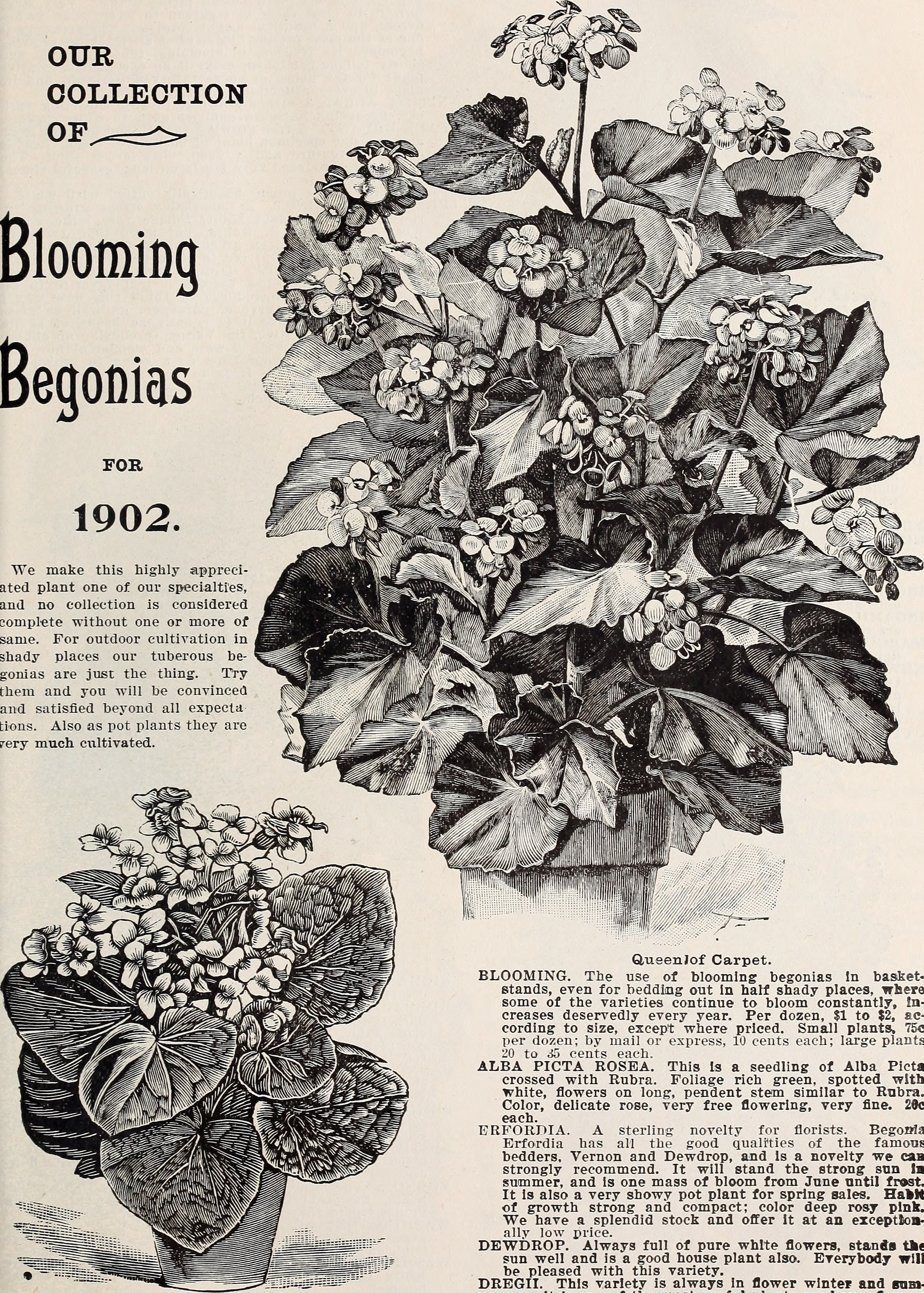
Page from Henry G. Gilbert's Nursery and Seed Trade Catalogue, Kentucky, 1902

==== Wunderman ====
Mail order had always relied on the innovative technique of selling products directly to the consumer at appealing prices, but the term "direct marketing" was only coined in 1967, by Lester Wunderman — considered to be the father of contemporary direct marketing. He was behind the creation of the toll-free 1-800 number and numerous mail order based loyalty marketing programs including the Columbia Record Club, the magazine subscription card, and the American Express Customer Rewards program.

=== Rise of e-commerce ===
With the invention of the Internet, a company's website became the more usual way to order merchandise for delivery by mail. Unless the retailer provides a paper catalogue from which to order, that is if the products are mainly presented to and searched for by the customer on a web site or mobile app, the term "mail order" is rarely used to describe the ordering of goods over the Internet. It is more usual to refer to this as e-commerce or online shopping. Online shopping allows more detailed information (including audio and video) to be presented, and allows for faster ordering than by mailed form (though phone orders are also common for mail-order catalogues). Most traditional mail order companies now also sell over the Internet, in some cases with a PDF or tablet application which allows shoppers to browse an electronic catalog that resembles a paper one very closely, though by the late 2010s this has become increasingly rare, and product information is presented in a format designed for the Web and mobile apps, rather than a PDF.

Rising paper, printing, and postage costs have caused some traditional catalogue merchants, such as Bloomingdale's, to suspend their printed catalogues and sell only through websites. Also, while some Internet merchants are or were also catalogue merchants, many have never had a printed catalogue.

=== Catalogue publishing ===
Year Mail Order Catalogues were founded

- Tiffany's Blue Book: 1845 (US)
- Thonet brothers 1859 (GER)
- Royal Welsh Warehouse 1861 (UK)
- Montgomery Ward: 1872 (US)
- FAO Schwarz: 1876 (US)
- Hammacher Schlemmer: 1881 (US; claims to be the longest-running catalogue in the U.S.)
- Eaton's: 1884 (Canada)
- Kastner & Öhler: 1885 (Austria)
- Sears: 1888 (US)
- Kays Catalogues: 1889 (UK)
- Universal Stores: 1900 (UK)
- Freemans: 1905 (UK)
- Spiegel Inc. 1905 (US)
- Empire: 1907 (UK)
- Grattan: 1912 (UK)
- Johnson Smith Company: 1907 (US)
- L.L.Bean: 1912 (US)
- Lane Bryant: 1917 (US)
- Eddie Bauer: 1920 (US)
- La Redoute: 1922 (France)
- Quelle: 1927 (Germany)
- SS Adams Company: 1920s (US)
- Littlewoods: 1932 (UK)
- 3 Suisses: 1932 (FR)
- Radio Shack: 1939 (US)
- Neiman Marcus: 1939 (US)
- Scholastic: 1940 (US)
- Vermont Country Store: 1945 (US)
- Spencer Gifts: 1947 (US)
- Walter Drake: 1947 (US)
- Neckermann: 1950 (Germany)
- Lillian Vernon: 1951 (US)
- Ikea: 1951
- Taylor Gifts: 1952 (US)
- Simpsons-Sears: 1953 (Canada) - a partnership of Sears with the pre-existing Simpson's chain
- Otto: 1949 (Germany)
- Columbia Record Club: 1955 (US)
- Service Merchandise: 1960 (US)
- Lands' End: 1963 (US)
- Potpourri Group: 1963 (US)
- JC Penney: 1963 (US)
- Quill Corporation: 1963 (US)
- Lego: 1966
- Whole Earth Catalog: 1968 (US)
- Carol Wright Gifts: 1972 (US)
- Victoria's Secret: 1977 (US)
- Sharper Image: 1977 (US)
- Dr Leonard's Healthcare Corp: 1980 (US)
- Hallmark: 1979 (US)
- Toys R Us Big Book: 1980 (US)
- J.Crew: 1983 (US)
- Archie McPhee: 1984 (US)
- Next: 1988 (UK)
- Staples Direct: 1988 (US)
- Previews/Diamond: 1988 (US)
- SkyMall: 1990 (US)
- Scotts of Stow: 1992 (UK)
- Delia's: 1993 (US)
- Abercrombie & Fitch: 1997 (US)
- Urban Outfitters: 2003 (US)
- Westport Big & Tall: 2006 (US)

== Taxes ==
The objective of the direct marketing industry is to alter the sales distribution chain, in other words [bypass] the wholesaler and the retailer and go directly to the customer, reducing therefore tariffs and taxes.

In the European Union, a "VAT union" is in force: the merchant selling to a buyer in a different EU member country adds the VAT of his own country to the price, and the buyer pays no additional tax. A buyer for resale may deduct that VAT, just as with purchases made within their own country.

Up until June 21, 2018, mail order retailers in the United States operated with the advantage of not being required to collect state sales tax, unless the retailer's business had a physical presence in the customer's state. Instead, most states required the resident purchaser to pay the applicable taxes. In 2018, after the United States Supreme Court heard the case of South Dakota v. Wayfair, Inc. and a five-justice majority overturned Quill Corp. v. North Dakota, ruling that the physical presence rule decided in Quill was "unsound and incorrect" in the current age of Internet services, American e-commerce and mail order retailers began collecting state sales tax on orders.

== See also ==
- Home shopping
- Book sales club
- Catalogue merchant
- Mail-order bride
- OshKosh B'Gosh
- Pick and pack
- Shipping list
- Trade literature
- Wine of the Month Club
- Whole Earth Catalogue
