= John Chamberlain (died 1617) =

16th-century English politician

Sir John Chamberlain (1559 - 1617), usually Chamberlayne, of Prestbury, Gloucestershire, was an English manorial lord who inherited the barony of Churchdown, Gloucestershire from his father, Sir Thomas Chamberlain (c.1504-1580), to whom it had been granted in 1552 for diplomatic services to the Crown. He served as High Sheriff of Gloucestershire in 1596-97, and is provisionally identified as the John Chamberlain who sat in the parliaments of 1593 and 1597. His family claimed direct descent from the High Chamberlains of Normandy, the Tankervilles, but (despite gentrified lineage) his manorial lordships, which shaped his preoccupations and consumed his estate, were not deeply rooted in ancestral holdings.

== Young life ==
He was the elder son, and the armigerous heir, of the thrice-married diplomat Sir Thomas Chamberlain of Prestbury, Gloucestershire (died 1580) by his second wife Joan, née Luddington, who had licence to marry in London on 10 October 1558. Joan, a step-daughter of Sir William Laxton, was the widow of alderman John Machell, citizen and Master Clothworker of London (died 12 August 1558), by whom she had five young children surviving. Owing to his father's diplomatic status, John Chamberlain had a distinguished baptism at St Benet's, Paul's Wharf (which was hung with cloth of Arras) on 27 October 1559, his godfathers being the Swedish prince John, Duke of Finland and Lord Robert Dudley, and his godmother the Marchioness of Northampton: a banquet followed of wafers, spice-bread and confits, with hippocras and muskadine wines.

Despite his father's long absences abroad, John had a younger brother Edmund Chamberlain (c. 1560), afterwards of Maugersbury, by Stow-on-the-Wold (died 1634), and a sister Theophila (c. 1563). There were also an elder and a younger half-brother, both named Thomas Chamberlain. John's birth-mother Joan died before May 1566, when his father obtained administration, during minority, of the affairs of their three children. Sir Thomas remarried in 1567 to Anne, widow and executrix of William Pyerson (citizen and Scrivener of the Court Letter, died 1566), the daughter of William Karkeke, sister of Elizabeth the first wife of diplomat Sir Thomas Smith, and half-sister of Sir Anthony Monck of Potheridge, Devon. This lady, who brought four sons and three daughters from her former marriage, was John's stepmother from his age of eight years.

He matriculated from Trinity College, Oxford in 1579, and was contemporary in the University with his brother Edmund, both going up at the same time. John married Elizabeth, daughter of Sir John Thynne (died 1580), a union planned by their fathers in the year in which they died. The couple had no children. The association with the Thynne family was clearly active in the 1580s, as the three Chamberlain brothers are found with them in an affray in Wiltshire in c.1589.

== Baronial and manorial lordships ==
=== Churchdown and Prestbury ===
The Barony of Churchdown, Gloucestershire, was granted to Sir John's father in 1552 in respect of his diplomatic services to Kings Henry VIII and Edward VI: it consisted of the several manors of Churchdown, Hucclecote, Norton (Bishop's Norton), Shurdington, Witcombe, Compton Abdale, Oddington, Condicote and North Cerney. The manor of Prestbury, a seat belonging to the Bishops of Hereford since before the Norman conquest, was taken by Queen Elizabeth I in 1560, and was leased to Sir Thomas Chamberlain in 1564. In 1574, the lease being granted to Robert, Earl of Leicester (John's godfather), the site of the actual manor-house, with its appurtenances and reversion, became detached from its lands and remained with Sir Thomas: Chamberlain then (October 1575) obtained the lifetime Keepership of Prestbury Park for himself and his son John, implying the intention of settled residence there. The large former deer park of the bishops of Hereford at Prestbury was by then somewhat decayed: the office was a jurisdiction, or franchise.

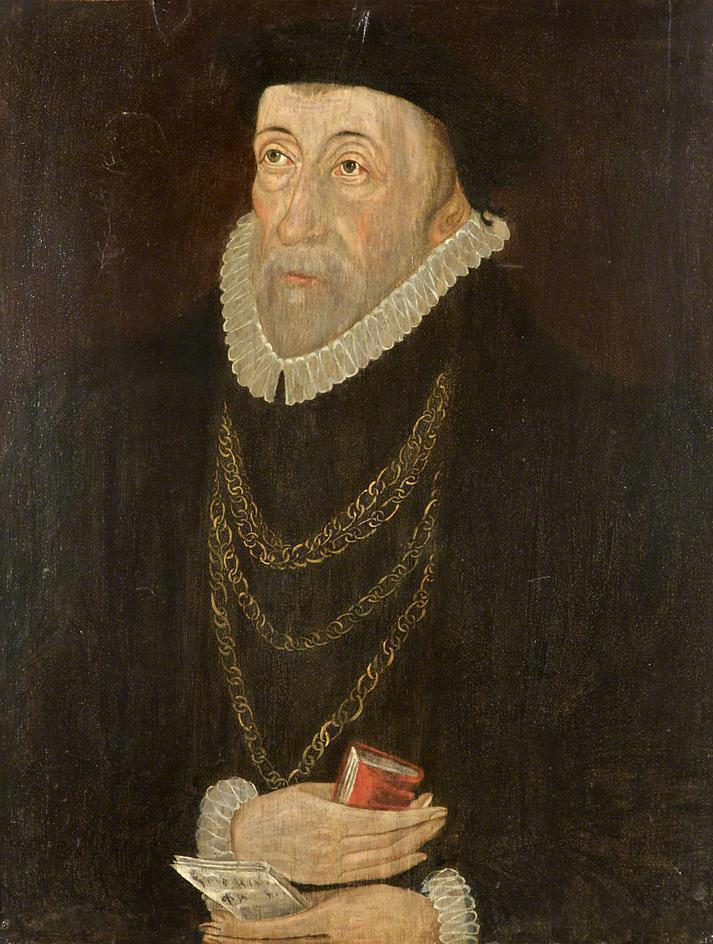
Richard Pate, Recorder of Gloucester

In 1549 Sir Thomas had purchased numerous properties around Gloucester jointly with Richard Pate (a commissioner to Kings Henry and Edward for surveying and valuing suppressed religious establishments in Gloucester and Bristol) seizin of which they shortly conveyed to the Mayor and Burgesses of Gloucester. Chamberlain received the grant of the Churchdown barony to himself in 1552. Under Queen Mary, Pate appears as Recorder of Gloucester by 1556 and was confirmed in that important office by Elizabeth in 1561. Chamberlain having the lease of Prestbury in 1564 (where he soon ran into disputes over the tithes of Sevenhampton), Pate became his Steward for the Churchdown barony and, as collector of the heriots and fines within those manors, he became embroiled in the tenants' disputes over the manorial customs. In particular it was complained that long-held heritable tenures were refused renewal, or that the fines payable on admittances were being inflated, and in 1569 Chamberlain confronted Pate in Star Chamber over the violent disruption of a Court Baron at Churchdown.

By 1580, when Sir Thomas died, Condicote and North Cerney were not mentioned in his will, and Compton Abdale had been mortgaged to his stepson William Pierson. What was left of the barony, with the exception of Oddington, was bequeathed to John and his heirs male, together with lands at Parton (in Churchdown) and Upton St Leonards, and the manor-house at Prestbury, all with the reversions. John was to redeem Compton Abdale and convey it to his younger brother Edmund, who was given powers of entry upon Witcombe and Hucclecote for distraint in default of annuities owing and due to him. The third brother, Thomas, received Oddington. John and Edmund were about 21 and 20 when their father died, and had newly matriculated at Oxford; Thomas was about 13.

=== The coming generation ===
Dame Anne Chamberlain, John's stepmother since October 1567, continued to live at Prestbury until her death in 1588, but had no part in the Chamberlain manors. By 1588 John's sister Theophila, disinherited by her father for an inappropriate liaison, had become respectably married to Thomas Hewes of Kemerton (son of a senior physician attending Queen Mary who died in the same mortality of late 1558): and was rehabilitated. Meanwhile, Dame Anne's own children had married and raised families, two of which bore closely upon Prestbury's manorial interests. Rose Pyerson married George Bagehot (or Badger, died 1612), lord of the second Prestbury manor, Hall Place (Llantony's), while her sister Winifred became the wife of Reginald Nicholas (or "Nicles"), who had been in service to the Chamberlains, and their tenant. Thomas Chamberlain of Oddington, the half-brother, married Margaret, daughter of Edward Bagehot.

=== A troubled inheritance ===
John Chamberlain inherited problems and debts with his father's estate. After Sir Thomas detached the mansion at Prestbury from its manor in 1574, in 1577 a group of Churchdown tenants (from Hucclecote and Shurdington) brought suit against him in Chancery alleging practice, involving Pate as steward, over their tenures. By order of that court, meetings were held at Prestbury to inspect the claims and customs: these being incompletely resolved by 1580, in 1582 the tenants (wanting a settlement) brought a fresh suit against John Chamberlain (aged 23), heir to the barony, who after a long hearing agreed to ratify a schedule of customary terms favourable to the plaintiffs (heritable estate for six descents), as approved by himself and the court, all seeking an harmonious outcome. In 1583-1585, tenants of Witcombe faced a claim of perjury relating to manorial rights. In 1590, lawsuits broke out between Chamberlain, seeking to recover goods delivered to Lady Anne, and George Bagehot (her executor), who invoked the will of his wife's late father: the dispute led to commissions, depositions and inventories, and in 1591 to the Star Chamber.

The rifts widened. In 1591 Reginald Nycholas brought suit against Chamberlain, while Andrew Maunsell, for Chamberlain, conducted an inquiry in Star Chamber against a group of barony tenants (led by Giles Badger) asserting inheritance rights in their copyholds. A Chancery decree of 1594, finding for Chamberlain and Maunsell as defendants, showed that before Sir Thomas's death, both Nycholas (with Winifred) and Maunsell had received copyholds forfeited by tenants for non-payment of heriots: the deprived tenants for their part argued that a grant "sibi et suis" (to him and to his) implied a perpetual estate of inheritance, that payments tendered had been refused, and invoked the custom of free bench. Nycholas had surrendered the copyholds so received to John Chamberlain at his succession to the barony, while both John and Edmund Chamberlain, in John's defence, affirmed that the agreement reached in 1582 had not taken account of all the relevant deeds, and that fresh evidences had come to light "since the death of Mayster Pates whoe kepte the same" in 1588. In his will, Pate refers to all the leases of parsonages and tithes in Churchdown, Hucklecote, etc., which he has in tenure from Sir Thomas and his son John Chamberlain, the proceeds to be taken by his widow for a further twenty-one years.

=== Retrenchment ===
John Chamberlain is presumed to be the same who sat in parliament for Clitheroe in 1593 and St Germans in 1597. He served as High Sheriff of Gloucestershire in 1596-7. Reginald Nycholas, when entering Parliament in 1597, acquired the reversion of the lease of the detached manorial lands at Prestbury, and is said to have supplanted the Chamberlains there: Sir John's debts were developing, and he conducted suits against Nycholas in Star Chamber between 1598 and 1602, defending title to the manor and barony of Churchdown, while in about 1605 Nycholas had a special commission of inquiry upon the demesne lands of the manor of Prestbury. From this emerged an order for the felling and sale of woods in Prestbury Park and grounds adjoining, which remained in Chamberlain's possession, and which he resisted. Nycholas seems to have possessed the manor and park by a different path of title arising since 1574. He was indebted to the Crown, and Chamberlain accused Nycholas of trying to void his lease of the Park.

With many others, John Chamberlain was knighted on 23 July 1603 in the King's garden at Whitehall before the coronation. At this time, in 1603, Edmund Chamberlain acquired the manor of Maugersbury (with Stow on the Wold) for his own estate: he had recently received a lease and entered upon premisses at Adelstrop as attorney for a senior lawyer. The maternal kin, John's grandmother Dame Joan Laxton (died 1574), his uncle Nicholas Luddington (late Governor of the Merchant Adventurers, died 1595) and his aunt Dame Anne Lodge (died 1579) had made no mention of the Chamberlains in their wills (nor Chamberlain of them), though Sir Thomas Lodge (died 1585) had been with Thomas Chamberlain and Stephen Vaughan in Flanders in the 1540s. Perhaps they blamed Chamberlain for having left Joan impoverished with their three small children while he tarried with Philip II in Spain (as Peter Osborne reported); or, after her death, for his having impugned John Machell's trustees (two of whom were Rowland Hayward and Lodge himself). John and Edmund's surviving half-brother John Machell of Hackney (1546-1624) was now submerged almost irrecoverably in debt, litigation and other torments. John Chamberlain could not look for support from that quarter. In 1606-07, Edmund fell into legal disputes with the bailiffs and burgesses of Stow over their rents and market rights, which he successfully defended as belonging to the manor.

=== Towards dissolution ===
His brother-in-law Sir John Thynne (the younger) of Longleat having died in 1604, succeeded by Sir Thomas, in 1609 John Chamberlain wrote to Thomas Thynne, son of Sir Thomas, offering to assist him to obtaining an honour: he suggested that £3000 would be a "reasonable" sum for which to acquire a Barony. Following the commissions of June 1611 – 1612 over Prestbury, in which complaint of Chamberlain's resistance to the sale of woods was countered by his objections of waste and spoil, the weight of debts being upon him, on 26 May 1612 John made a sealed indenture with Sir Thomas and Thomas Thynne, making bargain and sale to them of the manors and lordships of Churchdown, Hucklecote and Widcombe, and the mansion house in Prestbury, for £600 paid to him, and subject to covenants and agreements. This was made with a bond from himself and a collateral bond of his brother Edmund, for the security of Sir Thomas Thynne, upon trust that Thynne should immediately sell as much as was needed to pay the £600, to dismortgage the manors, and to satisfy all debts liable upon them.

However, the Thynnes did not immediately do this, with the result that Edmund Chamberlain, refusing to sell his own estate to satisy his brother's debts, first entered the King's Bench Prison as a debtor, and then removed himself and his household to the Warden's suite at the Fleet Prison, where he refused also to pay any customary rent, but kept lively company. Edmund had the best chambers available, according to the Warden, but became unbiddable. After 5 years, from 11 May 1617 he began to behave with more than usual pride and haughtiness, which persisted until the Warden took action in October following. John Chamberlain, meanwhile, making his will, directed that his first creditor to be paid should be Thomas Chamberlain of Gloucester (the elder), but that Edmund was his heir. He drew up a schedule noting that Sir Thomas Thynne had failed to carry out his trust, so that the £600 payment was now doubled, the mortgages were not redeemed, and "other extremities" had fallen upon Sir John. He therefore now appointed Edmund Chamberlain of Maugersbury, Thomas Chamberlain of Gloucester, and Simon Egerton of London (Nicholas Luddington's grandson) to come to terms with the Thynnes, to divide up the estate and settle the debts, and Edmund as his heir to have any overplus remaining.

John died childless, but was survived by his wife. Edmund attended the Probate court to give oath to administer his deceased brother's estate on 21 June 1617, but his imprisonment continued. Harris, the Warden, had Edmund moved into the common gaol together with his many trunks and possessions, whereat he complained of the loss of a Bond for £7,000, which the Warden thought laughable. The Warden became cruel, moving him often and throwing out his bedding to oblige him to pay the prison rent. Edmund incited protests and mutinies against him, forming an alliance with his kinsman Sir John Whitbroke of Bridgenorth, grandson of old John Machell's sister Katherine. So effective were his promptings that Whitbrooke attacked the Warden in his chamber and nearly killed him: Whitbrooke was later stabbed to death by a fellow prisoner. In July 1618, meanwhile, Edmund tendered a petition to the Privy Council seeking relief from his maltreatment after a confinement of five years by being surety for his brother. He was released around 1621.

=== Recovery of Edmund Chamberlain ===
Eventually Edmund returned to Maugersbury and, despite continuing suits concerning his brother's debts secured upon Prestbury mansion and the Churchdown manors, he established the Chamberlayne lordship at Maugersbury, in the Luddington matrilineal descent. The father of the Oxford scholar Edmund Chilmead was closely attached to Edmund's household. The descent from Sir Thomas by the Kyrkeke marriage to Dame Anne was seated at Oddington, where the memorial inscription of her son Thomas Chamberlayne was placed in the church. Theophila Hewes outlived her husband, was living in 1626 (when she had a Chancery suit against the rector of Kemerton), and had children. Despite all vicissitudes, the Chamberlains appear to have retained possession of the manor house at Prestbury into the 18th century.
