= 8Wines =

- Type: Private
- Industry: Wine trade, wine import and retail
- Founded: 2015
- Founder: Vasily Dinkov and Sergey Nekipelov
- Area served: Europe
- Products: Wine
- Services: Wine importing, online retail, wholesale, wine club
- Website: https://8wines.com/

8Wines (officially 8Wines, s.r.o.) is a wine importer, merchant, online retailer and wine club based in Prague, Czech Republic, founded in 2015.

== History ==
8Wines was founded in January 2015 by Vasily Dinkov and Sergey Nekipelov as a private limited liability company (8Wines, s.r.o.) based in Prague, Czech Republic. Its early portfolio focused on importing United States and New World wines into the European market, operating entirely on internal funding during its initial years

On May 13, 2021, Purcari Wineries Group (Purcari Wineries PLC), a wine producer listed on the Bucharest Stock Exchange, completed a transaction to become the first external institutional investor in 8Wines. Purcari acquired a 10% minority equity stake for an undisclosed sum.

In March 2024, the company was included in the Financial Times FT 1000 index of Europe's fastest-growing companies, ranking 8th out of 22 enterprises within the Food & Beverages sector. The listing noted a multi-year revenue compound annual growth rate (CAGR) of 67.8%.

== Operations and selection ==
The company operates as a wine importer, sourcing wines directly from the estates. Its retail portfolio focuses on New World wine regions, including the US, Argentina, and New Zealand, alongside European selections from Italy, France, Spain, and others.

== Awards and recognition ==
• Wine-Searcher has awarded 8Wines its Gold Medal for wine selection for nine consecutive years, from 2018 to 2026.

• The company was included in the Financial Times FT 1000 index, an annual ranking of European companies by compound annual growth rate, in both 2024 and 2026.
