= The Beer Hunter =

The Beer Hunter may refer to

- A 1986 Computer Adventure Game by Mike Roberts (writer, video game designer, politician)
- A TV series about beer by Michael Jackson (writer)
- An episode of the TV series Minder: List of Minder episodes#The Beer Hunter
