= Maugersbury Manor =

Coordinates: 51.9248°N 1.7143°W

Maugersbury Manor is a manor house in the village of Maugersbury in Gloucestershire. It has been listed Grade II on the National Heritage List for England (NHLE) since August 1960. It has been built in various stages from the 17th to the 20th century and is made from dressed limestone with a slate roof. A third storey was added in the 18th century to the central part of the house. The right wing of the house was demolished, the left wing is two storey high with an attic.

At the time of the 1987 revision of its listing on the NHLE, Maugersbury Manor was divided into houses, flats, and a school. An underground passage reportedly links the manor house with the King's Arms Hotel in Stow Square.

Maugersbury Manor sold for £1.75 million in 2017. At the time of its 2017 sale it had eight reception rooms, 10 bedrooms, and a cellar.
