= Wine of the Month Club =

Mail order wine club in the United States

- Type: Privately held company
- Founded: California, 1972
- Headquarters: Monrovia, California, U.S.
- Products: Discount wine, gift baskets, and wine accessories
- Website: wineofthemonthclub.com

Wine of the Month Club is the oldest sustained mail order wine club in the United States, having been founded in 1972 by Paul Kalemkiarian Sr. and succeeded in ownership by his son Paul Kalemkiarian Jr. in 1989. Located in Monrovia, California, the Club delivers two bottles of wine, one domestic, one international, to the doors of members nationwide every month, every other month, or every quarter. The Club aims to expose members to a broad range of grape varieties and wine regions. Those wines that are featured have had to endure a series of appraisals by the owner and cellarmaster Paul Jr., based on both their quality and their price. Ultimately, only twelve of 300–400 or so wines that are evaluated each month are selected. The club also offers wine gifts and made-to-order food and wine gif baskets. Along with wine shipments, customers are sent the Wine of the Month Club's monthly newsletter which provides extensive background information for each of the featured wines.

== History ==
Wine of the Month Club's founder, Paul Kalemkiarian Sr., arrived in the United States in 1949 in pursuit of a master's degree at the University of Southern California, after having earned a bachelor's degree in Pharmacognosy (the study of plant-based medicines) at the University of Cairo, Egypt. Soon after completing his degree, he began working for a pharmaceutical firm in the product development department, where he concocted new cough medicines, antifungals, etc. Kalemkiarian Sr. opened his first prescription shop in Inglewood, California, in 1955. The company eventually grew to a point where he had bought and sold over 12 pharmacies, having five open at any one time.

While running the Prescription Shop in Palos Verdes Estates, California, located in the Malaga Cove, Kalemkiarian Sr. set out to purchase Palos Verdes Drugstore from its owner, Walter Reese. Kalemkiarian Sr. offered to buy the pharmacy only if it included the adjoining liquor store. Walter Reese's motivation to sell the pharmacy was greater than his desire to keep the liquor store, and Palos Verdes Wines and Spirits was born.

Kalemkiarian Sr. soon transformed Palos Verdes Liquor—which, up until this point, had sold mostly ice, cigarettes, and liquor (with very little wine)—into a fine wine shop which he renamed Palos Verdes Wines and Spirits. By the mid-1970s, Palos Verdes Wines and Spirits was one of the most prominent wine shops in the Los Angeles area. Kalemkiarian Sr.'s son, Paul Kalemkiarian Jr., who was a teenager at that time, helped to stock the shop.

At some point in 1973, Kalemkiarian Sr. began to select monthly wine selections, one red and one white, to aid the patron who would walk in asking for a nice wine on a budget of $5.00 or so. Weekly tastings, meanwhile, were held in a precarious homemade loft in the back of the wine shop. Kalemkiarian Jr. would set up, brown bagging all the wines and laying out glasses. Kalemkiarian Sr. would invite knowledgeable customers and physicians he knew through his pharmacies, and together, they would select the wines of the month. These selections were the impetus for the Wine of the Month Club as it exists today.

Eventually, store customers requested that their monthly selections be delivered to them. The day Kalemkiarian Jr. received his driver's license, he delivered his first round of Wine of the Month Club packages to local customers. Father and son continued to hand-deliver the selections until the number of customers requesting this service grew too numerous, at which point they moved to deliveries by the United Parcel Service (UPS).

By 1979, Paul Kalemkiarian Sr. grew weary of retail and began the process of selling his pharmacies. Palos Verdes Wines and Spirits was sold the same year, but due to mismanagement on the part of the new owners, was closed soon thereafter. Paul Kalemkiarian Sr., however, had retained the mail order rights, and trademarked the name "Wine of the Month Club", which he soon operated as a freestanding entity.

In 1989, Paul Kalemkiarian Sr. offered to sell the Wine of the Month Club to his son, Paul Kalemkiarian Jr., after a six-month trial period. At the time, Kalemkiarian Jr. was a partner in a stable and growing software company. In 1990, and after the six-month trial period had elapsed, Kalemkiarian Jr. was ready to make a career change, and purchased the business from his father.

== See also ==
- Wine clubs
- Wine tasting
