= Rare Beer Club =

Mail-order craft beer club

The Rare Beer Club is an online mail-order club specializing in exclusive beers for craft beer enthusiasts. It was founded by the British journalist and beer critic Michael Jackson.

== Reception ==
Sarah Bennett of the Los Angeles Times called The Rare Beer Club “game-changing,” with “expertly curated bottle shipments that continue to be among the best in the industry,” and noted that about half of the beers featured in the monthly selections were produced exclusively for the club. Fortune magazine affirmed that the club is the “favorite” of craft beer enthusiasts, and that it is “the way to go” for an experience “more off the beaten path.” The reviewer, however, cautioned that, given the high monthly price of membership, a “wish to gamble” would be a concern for those who would consider joining.

== Reviews ==
1. Popular Mechanics, the Rare Beer Club offers its members “the good, weird, funky stuff,” pointing out that “there are actually a few beers you likely couldn't find anywhere else, like extra hoppy harvest editions of Belgian pale ales or small batch fruit sours from rural Oregon.” The reviewer indicated that, though there are cheaper options for craft beer fans, the Rare Beer Club “offers the very most.”
2. The reviewer for Men’s Journal noted that mail-order clubs had first flourished before rare craft beers became widely available in grocery stores, and that the Rare Beer Club was “the one club still worth its dues.”
3. The Berghoff blog voted it one of the three best mail-order beer clubs in the United States. According to the American Craft Beer website “There are lots of decent beer clubs out there – but few as good as The Rare Beer Club.”

== See also ==
- Wine club
