= George Pepall =

English cricketer (1876–1953)

Personal information
- Born: 29 February 1876; Stow-on-the-Wold, Gloucestershire
- Died: 18 January 1953 (aged 76); Bourton-on-the-Water, Gloucestershire
- Batting: Right-handed
- Bowling: Right-arm fast
- Role: Bowler

Domestic team information
- Years: Team
- 1896-1904: Gloucestershire

Career statistics
Competition	FC
Matches	14
Runs scored	99
Batting average	5.82
100s/50s	0/0
Top score	45
Balls bowled	1460
Wickets	20
Bowling average	36.25
5 wickets in innings	1
10 wickets in match	0
Best bowling	5/63
Catches/stumpings	6/–
- Source: Cricinfo, 10 October 2021

George Pepall (29 February 1876 – 8 January 1953) was an English cricketer. He played 14 matches of first-class cricket for Gloucestershire between 1896 and 1904. His best figures were 5 for 63 against Yorkshire in 1896.
