= Jacques Gaffarel =

French scholar and astrologer (1601–1681)

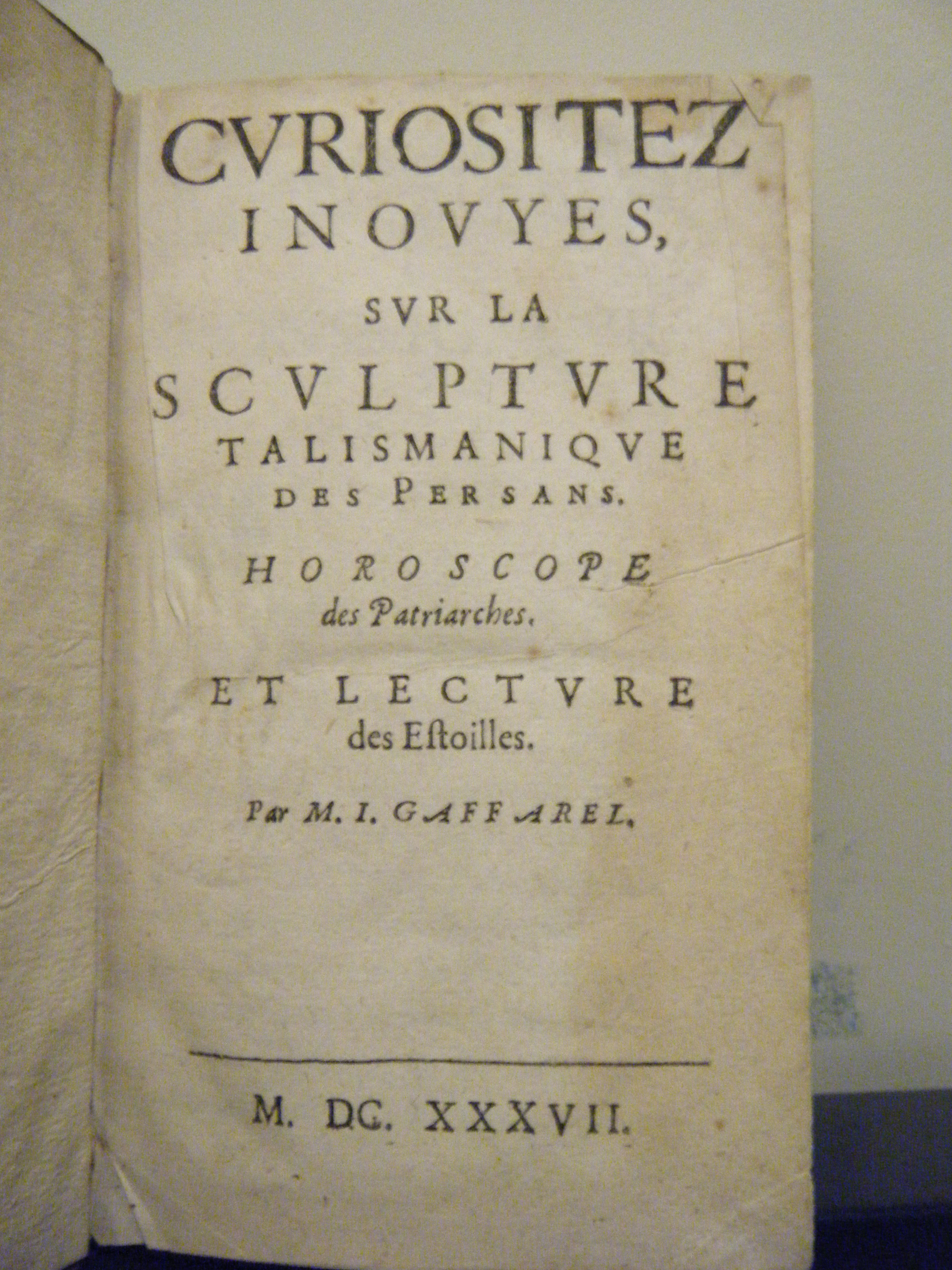
The inside cover of Curiositez inouyes sur la sculpture talismanique des Persans, horoscope des Patriarches et lecture des estoiles.

Jacques Gaffarel (Latin: Jacobus Gaffarellus) (1601–1681) was a French scholar and astrologer. He followed the family tradition of studying medicine, and then became a priest, but mainly developed his interests in the fields of natural history and Oriental occultism, gaining fluency in the Hebrew, Persian, and Arabic languages.

His most famous work is Curiositez inouyes sur la sculpture talismanique des Persans, horoscope des Patriarches et lecture des estoiles ("Unheard-of Curiosities concerning Talismanical Sculpture of the Persians, the horoscope of the Patriarchs, and the reading of the Stars), which was published in French in 1629 (and translated into English in 1650, by Edmund Chilmead). Gaffarel included in his work two large folding plates of "the Celestial Constellations expressed by Hebrew characters", and asserted that the letters of the Hebrew alphabet could be interpreted from the constellations and that the heavens could be read as if a book.

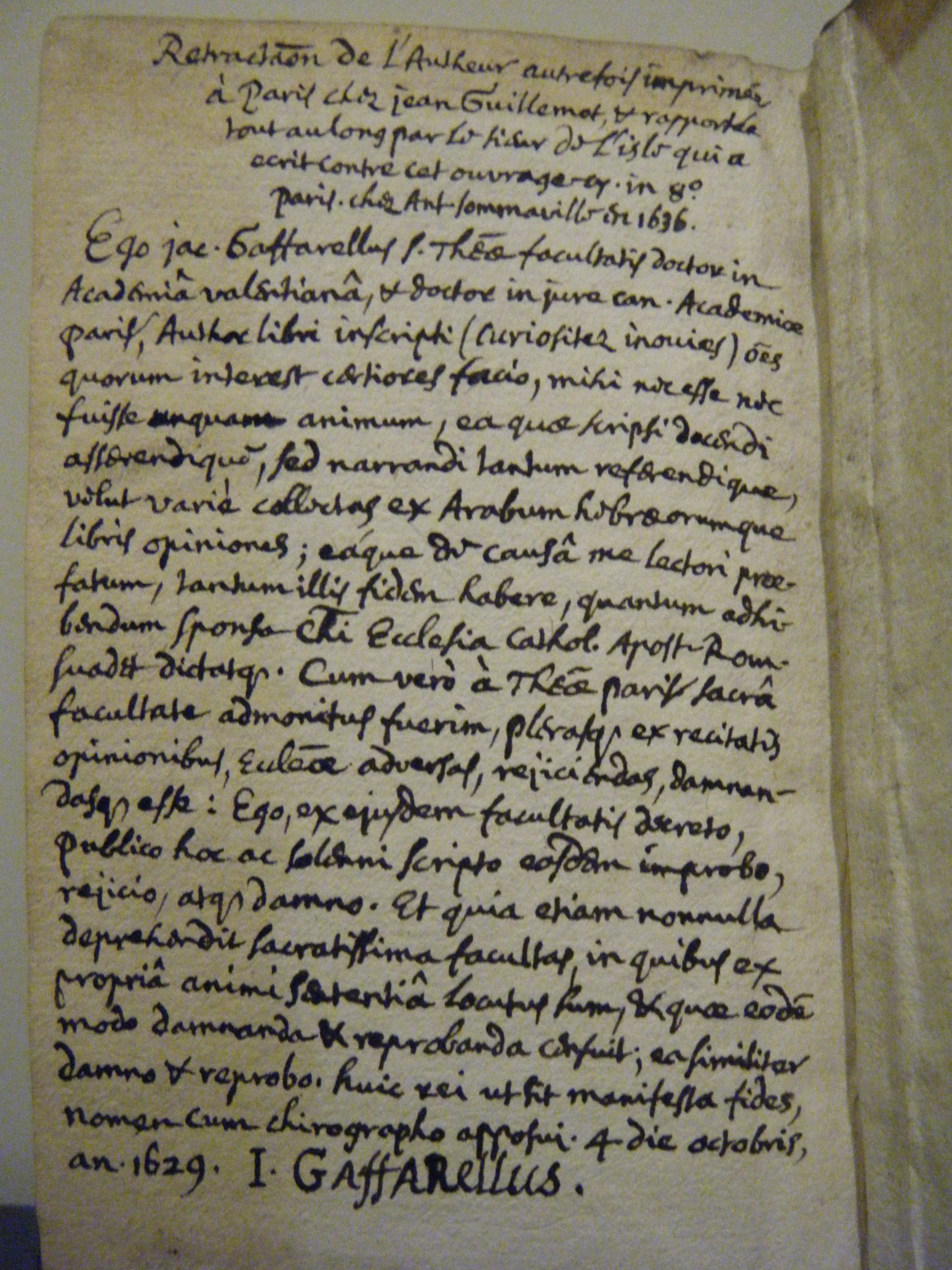
The retraction written in the above-mentioned book.

His book enjoyed phenomenal success. René Descartes read it with interest and the French physician and mathematician Pierre Gassendi (1592–1655) defended it. Unheard-of Curiosities was one of 1,500 books in the Library of Sir Thomas Browne and one of the varied sources of his encyclopaedia entitled Pseudodoxia Epidemica. Browne alludes to Gaffarel's astrology in The Garden of Cyrus thus:

Could we satisfy our selves in the position of the lights above, or discover the wisdom of that order so invariably maintained in the fixed stars of heaven......we might abate.....the strange Cryptography of Gaffarell in his Starrie Booke of Heaven.

Gaffarel contributed to the debate between Marin Mersenne and Robert Fludd.

On the other hand, the Sorbonne rejected Gaffarel's work and ridiculed him; however, he gained the protection of the powerful Cardinal Richelieu, who made him his librarian and sent him off first to Italy, then to Greece and Asia to retrieve rare books (reportedly including manuscripts by Pico della Mirandola).

== Works ==
- Abdita divinae Cabalae mysteria contra Sophistarum logomachiam defensa. H. Blagaeart, Paris 1625.
- Profonds mystères de la Cabale divine. Beaudelot, Paris 1912.
- Nihil, fere nihil, minus nihilo: seu de ente, non ente, et medio inter ens et non ens (= Positiones. Vol. 26). Pinelli, Venice 1634.
- Quaestio pacifica, num orta in religione dissidia componi et conciliari possint per humanas rationes et philosophorum (= Principia. Vol. 44). C. Du Mesnil, Paris 1645.
- Le Monde sousterrein, ou Description historique et philosophique de tous les plus beaux antres et de toutes les plus belles grottes de la terre. C. Du Mesnil, Paris 1654.

== Bibliography ==
- Hiro Hirai (ed.), Jacques Gaffarel between Magic and Science (Rome: Serra, 2014). ISBN 9788862277303
- Saverio Campanini, Eine späte Apologie der Kabbala. Die Abdita divinae Cabalae Mysteria des Jacques Gaffarel, in T. Frank – U. Kocher – U. Tarnow (edd.), Topik und Tradition. Prozesse der Neuordnung von Wissensüberlieferungen des 13. bis 17. Jahrhunderts, Göttingen 2007, pp. 325–351.
