= Oddington, Gloucestershire =

Civil parish in Gloucestershire, England

Oddington
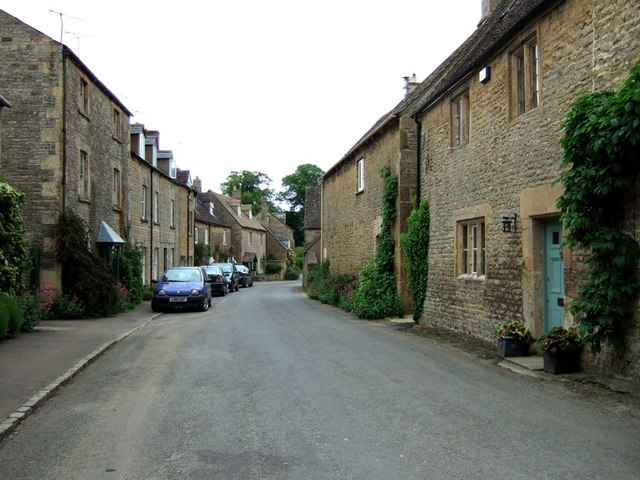
- Lower Oddington

- Location within Gloucestershire
- Population: 417 (2011 Census)
- Civil parish: Oddington
- District: Cotswold
- Shire county: Gloucestershire
- Region: South West
- Country: England
- Sovereign state: United Kingdom
- Post town: Moreton-in-Marsh
- Postcode district: GL56
- Police: Gloucestershire
- Fire: Gloucestershire
- Ambulance: South Western
- UK Parliament: North Cotswolds

Lower Oddington and Upper Oddington are a pair of adjoining villages in the English county of Gloucestershire. Together they form the civil parish of Oddington. In 2010 the parish had an estimated population of 477, decreasing at the 2011 census to 417.

The two villages are located to the south of the A436 road 2 miles (3.2 km) east of the town of Stow-on-the-Wold.

== History ==
In 1780 the Oddington estate, at one time a seat of the Chamberlayne family, was left to Elizabeth Ann Wilson by Crayle Crayle. Elizabeth, who was married to Charles Loraine Smith in 1784, sold this inheritance to Sir John Reade who extended the land by purchasing other lots. The 17th-century Oddington House was remodelled by Lady Reade c.1810 to form a large three storey L-shaped house but the East wing was demolished in a later restoration. It is a grade II* listed building, having been added to the register on 25 August 1960.

== St. Nicholas Church ==
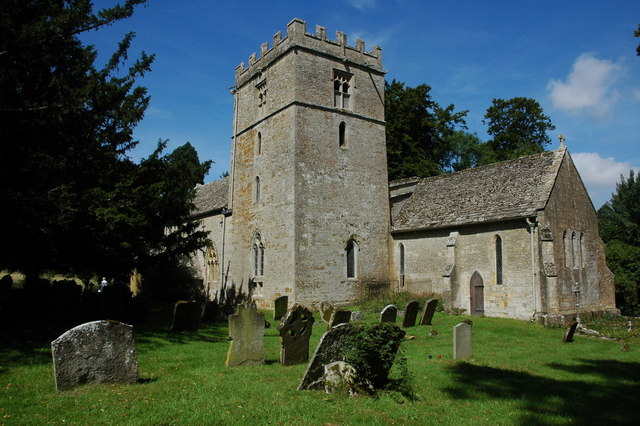
St Nicholas church

The Church of England parish church of Saint Nicholas is a Grade I listed building, having been added to the register on 25 August 1960. The church was originally a cell of St Peter's Benedictine abbey in Gloucester. It was ceded in 1157 to the Diocese of York and exchanged with the Crown in 1547. The church is built of dressed limestone and has a stone slate roof. Part of the nave is twelfth-century and part thirteenth-century. The chancel is fifteenth-century and the tower at the east end is thirteenth-century. The Norman south aisle probably represents the original nave. The church was all but abandoned among its fields in 1852, and has been little altered since.

The north wall of the nave has a medieval wall paintings of the Doom, dating to the early fifteenth century. These were whitewashed over in the English Reformation and conserved by Eve Baker from 1969. Scenes depicted include the Seven Acts of Mercy and the seven deadly sins.

== Notable residents ==
- Carol Mather (1919–2006), 20th Century soldier and politician.
