= Westport Big & Tall =

American clothing retailer

- Company type: E-commerce
- Industry: Retail
- Founded: 1989

Westport Big & Tall is an American retail company with a national catalog and worldwide e-commerce business selling specialized clothing for big and tall men. Westport Big & Tall is the largest privately held big and tall retailer in the world, an industry that has seen sustained growth in response to growing populations of men over six feet two inches (188 cm) or waist sizes over 40 inches (100 cm). Westport Big & Tall sources from more than 20 countries and ships to customers in more than 200 countries.

== History ==
Tom Altieri noticed an absence of quality clothing being offered for big and tall men, and developed a business plan to open his first concept store Westport, Connecticut in 1989. After proof of concept was complete, Altieri and business partner Bob Beausoleil moved the operation to Charlotte, North Carolina, where they opened their second retail location in 1994.

In 2006, Altieri and Beausoleil launched a national catalog and e-commerce platform in order to service this specialty area in men's clothing both within an outside the United States.
