= Stow-on-the-Wold =

Market town in Gloucestershire, England

Coordinates: 51°55′48″N 01°43′21″W

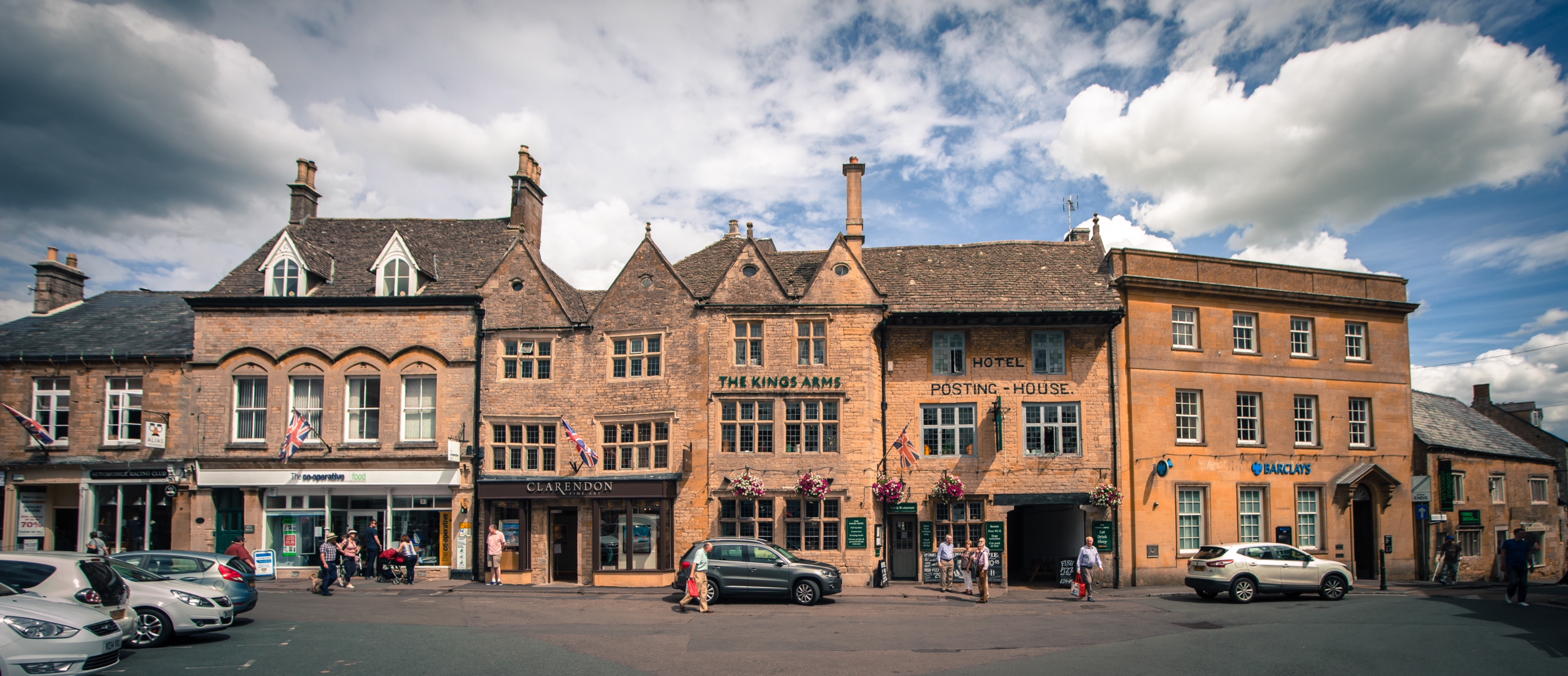
- Market Square

- Location within Gloucestershire
- Population: 1,905 (2021 Census)
- Civil parish: Stow-on-the-Wold
- District: Cotswold
- Shire county: Gloucestershire
- Region: South West
- Country: England
- Sovereign state: United Kingdom
- Post town: CHELTENHAM
- Postcode district: GL54
- Dialling code: 01451
- Police: Gloucestershire
- Fire: Gloucestershire
- Ambulance: South Western
- UK Parliament: North Cotswolds

Stow-on-the-Wold (/stoʊ ... wɒld/) is a market town and civil parish in Gloucestershire, England, on top of an 800-foot (244 m) hill at the junction of main roads through the Cotswolds, including the Fosse Way (A429), which is of Roman origin. The town was founded by Norman lords to absorb trade from the roads converging there. Fairs have been held by royal charter since 1330; a horse fair is still held on the edge of town nearest to Oddington in May and October each year.

Stow-on-the-Wold is approximately 49 miles (79 km) northeast of Bristol, 22 miles (35 km) east-northeast of Gloucester, and 15 miles (24 km) east-northeast of Cheltenham. The town had a population of 1,905 at the 2021 census.

== History ==
=== Early ===
Stow-on-the-Wold, originally called Stow St Edward or Edwardstow after the town's patron saint Edward, probably Edward the Martyr, is said to have originated as an Iron Age fort on this defensive position on a hill. There are other sites of similar forts in the area, and Stone Age and Bronze Age burial mounds are common throughout the area. It is likely that Maugersbury was the primary settlement of the parish before Stow was built as a marketplace on the hilltop nearer to the crossroads, to take advantage of passing trade. The name Stow derives from the Old English stōw meaning 'place'. Originally the small settlement was controlled by abbots from the local abbey, and when the first weekly market was set up in 1107 by Henry I, he decreed that the proceeds go to Evesham Abbey.

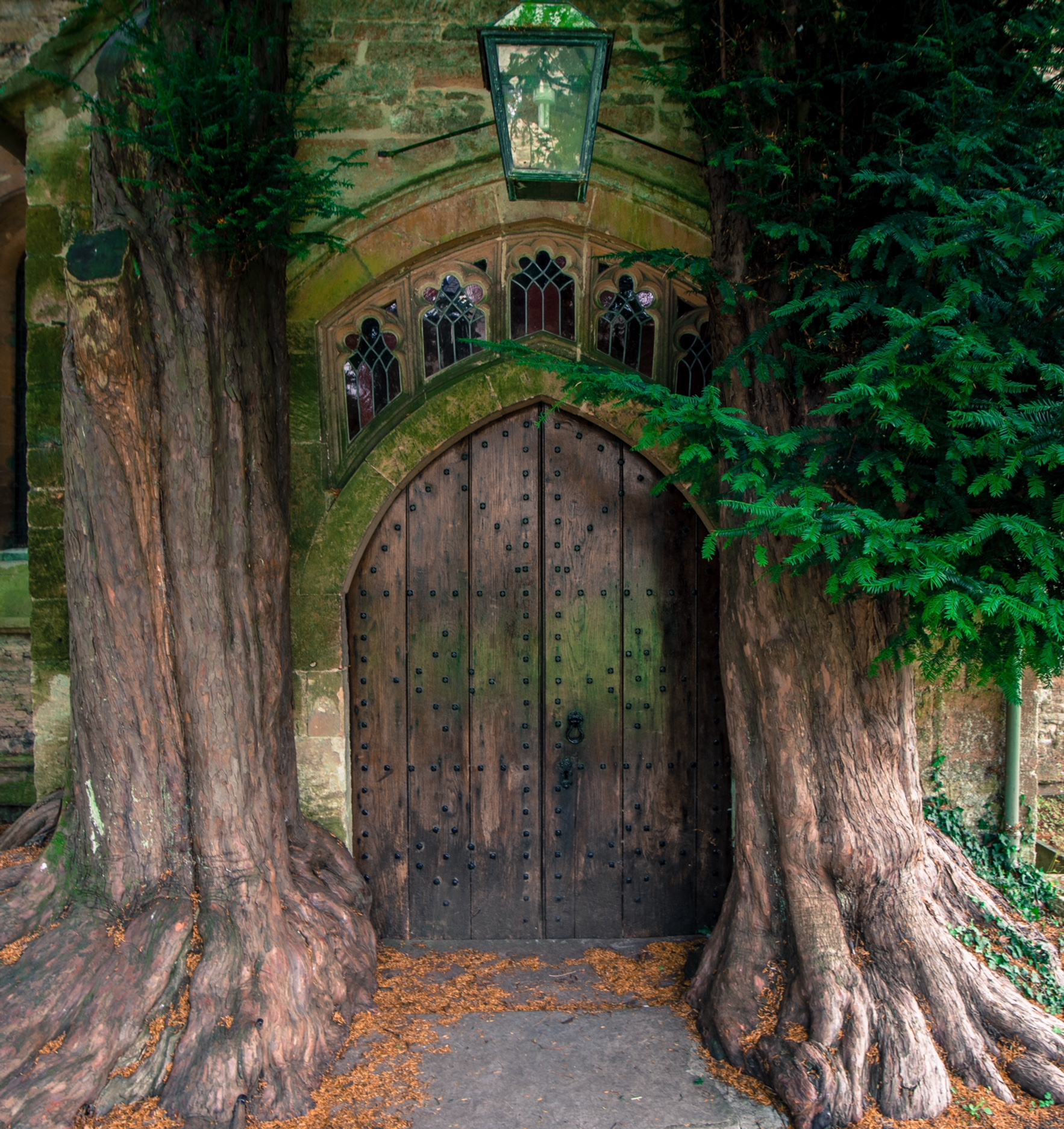
Ancient yew trees at the north porch of St Edward's Church

In 1330, a royal charter by Edward III set up an annual 7-day market to be held in August. The royal charter granted a fair where sheep and horses were allowed to be sold. In 1476, Edward IV replaced that with two 5-day fairs, two days before and two days after the feast of St Philip and St James in May, and similarly in October on the feast of Edward the Confessor (the saint associated with the town). The aim of the annual charter fairs was to establish Stow as a place to trade and alleviate the unpredictability of the passing trade. These fairs were located in the square, which is still the town centre.

=== Civil war ===
Stow played a role in the English Civil War. A number of engagements took place in the area, the local church of St Edward being damaged in one skirmish. On 21 March 1646, the Royalists, commanded by Sir Jacob Astley, were defeated at the Battle of Stow-on-the-Wold, with hundreds of prisoners being confined for some time in St Edwards. This battle took place one mile north of Stow-on-the-Wold. After initial royalist success, the superiority of the parliamentary forces overwhelmed and routed the royalist forces. Fleeing the field, the royalists fought a running fight back into the streets of Stow, where the final action took place, culminating in surrender in the market square.

=== 18th and 19th centuries ===
As the fairs grew in fame and importance, so did the town. Traders dealing in livestock added many handmade goods, and the wool trade was always prominent. Daniel Defoe reported in the 18th century that 20,000 sheep were sold in one day. Many alleys known as 'tures' that run between buildings into the market square were used in herding sheep to be sold. From the mid-19th century, the Talbot Hotel was the venue for corn merchants carrying out their trade. Most of the buildings around the market square date from the 18th to 19th century including St Edward's Hall (the present-day library).

== Governance ==
The town belongs to the Stow electoral ward, which covers the parishes of Stow-on-the-Wold, Maugersbury and Swell. In 2010 these parishes had a total population of 2,594. Stow ward is represented on Cotswold District Council by the Liberal Democrat Councillor Dilys Neill, who was first elected in the 2016 local elections. The Stow Division is represented on Gloucestershire County Council by the Conservative Councillor Mark Mackenzie-Charrington. Stow-on-the-Wold also has a Parish Council with 10 members.

== Transport and economy ==
The following roads pass through the town:

- The Fosse Way (A429) runs from the M4 motorway, just north of Chippenham, to the M40 motorway at Warwick
- The A424 links the town centre to the A44, near Bourton-on-the-Hill, which continues to Evesham
- The A436 connects Brockworth with Salford, Oxfordshire.

From 1881 until 1962, the town was served by Stow-on-the-Wold railway station on the Great Western Railway's Banbury and Cheltenham Direct Railway. The nearest station is now at Moreton-in-Marsh, which is 4 miles (6.4 km) away, on the Cotswold Line between Hereford and London Paddington; services are provided by Great Western Railway. An alternative is at Kingham, 5 miles (8.0 km) away from Stow on the same line.

Local bus services are operated predominantly by Pulhams Coaches; key routes that serve the town lead to Moreton-in-Marsh, Hook Norton and Bourton-on-the-Water.

Scotts of Stow, a mail order company, has two shops in the town.

== Media ==
Local news and television programmes are provided by BBC South and ITV Meridian. Television signals are received from the Oxford and local relay transmitters. Local radio stations are BBC Radio Gloucestershire, Heart West, Greatest Hits Radio South West and Cotswolds Radio, community based radio station The town is served by the local newspaper, Cotswold Journal.

== Stow Horse Fair ==
As the wool trade declined, people began to trade in horses. The practice continues, although the fair has been moved from the square to a large field near the village of Maugersbury every May and October. It remains popular, with roads around Stow blocked by the extra traffic for many hours. However, there has been controversy surrounding Stow Fair. The many visitors and traders have attracted more vendors not dealing in horses. Local businesses used to profit from the increased custom, but in recent years most pubs and shops close for 2–3 miles around due to the risks of theft or vandalism.

== Popular culture ==
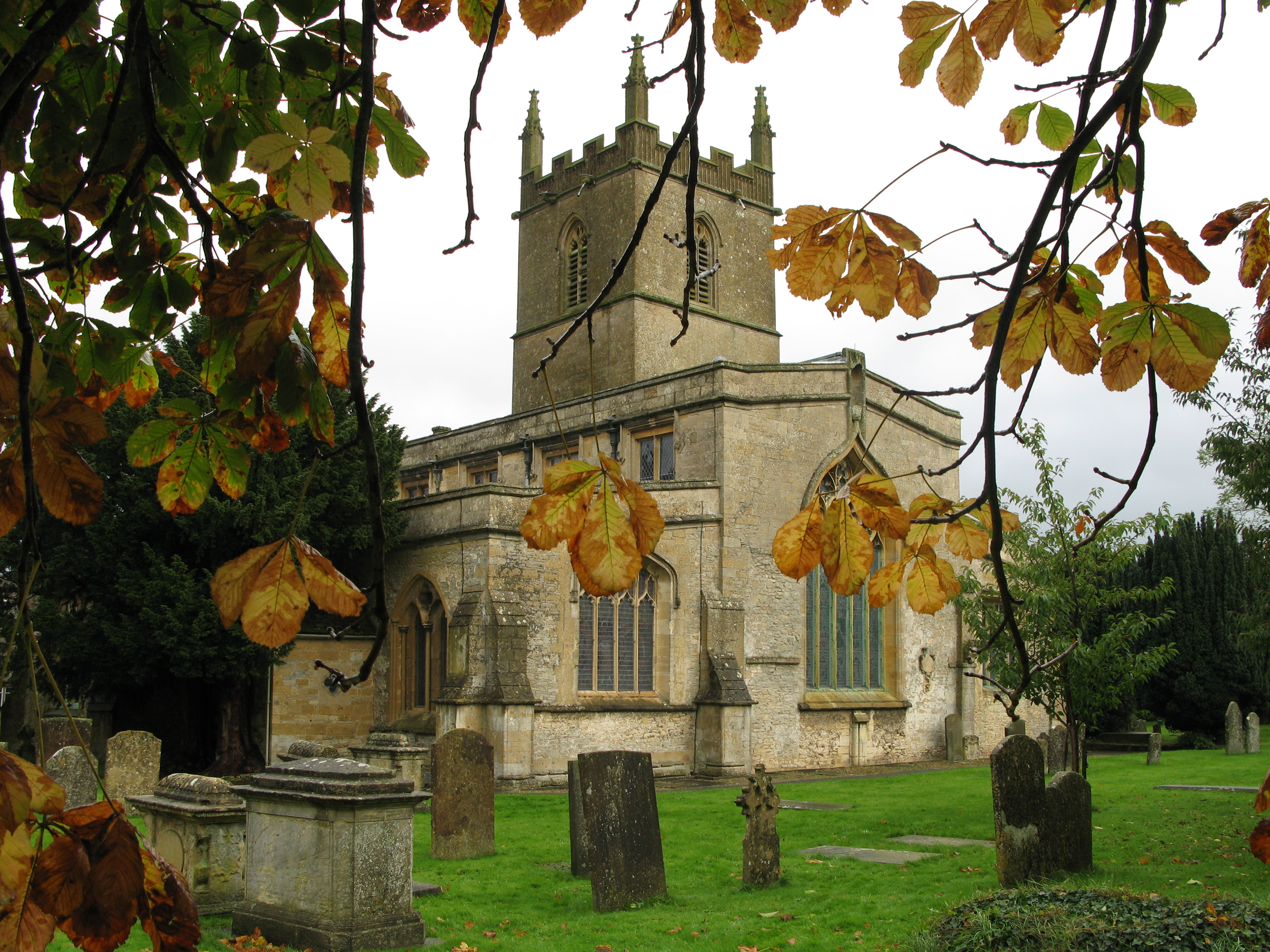
St Edward's Church

- Given its exposed spot on the top of Stow Hill, the town is often referred to as "Stow on the Wold, where the winds blow cold."

Stow-on-the-Wold, Where the wind blows cold.

Where horses young and old are sold,
Where farmers come to spend their gold,
Where men are fools and women are bold,
And many a wicked tale is told.

High on the freezing Cotswold.

- Stow-on-the-Wold featured prominently in the eleventh episode of series 6 of Top Gear, when Jeremy Clarkson reviewed the Ford F-Series there. He chose it as a venue because it is a typical community in the English countryside, which Clarkson compares to the American countryside in the episode.
- The town, in the year 1067, is the setting of Kurt Vonnegut's short story "The Unicorn Trap", published in the posthumous collection Armageddon in Retrospect.

== Notable people ==
- Clement Barksdale (1609–1687), writer and poet, was Rector of Stow-on-the-Wold from 1660 to 1687.
- Edmund Chilmead (1610–1654), writer, translator and musician, was born in the town.
- George Wilkinson (1814–1890), was the architect of Stow-on-the-Wold Workhouse in 1836.
- George Pepall (1876–1953), county cricketer, was born in the town.
- Harry Ferguson (1884–1960), engineer and inventor of the Ferguson tractor, died in the town.
- Frederic Bartlett (1886–1969), experimental psychologist and academic, was born in the town.
- John Howland (1895–1958), county cricketer, was born in the town.
- John Entwistle (1944–2002), musician, producer and bass guitarist of the Who, bought Quarwood in Stow-on-the-Wold in 1976. His funeral was held at St Edward's Church.
- David Loder (born 1964), racehorse trainer, was born in the town.
- Kieran Shoemark (born 1996), jockey, grew up in the town.
