= Cooperative database =

Anti-spam database type

A cooperative database is a type of database that holds information about customers and their transaction histories. Many companies will contribute information to a database in return for aggregate information on the customers other companies have provided. Such databases are used for promotional mailings, credit card fraud detection, digital media targeting, business intelligence, and fighting E-mail spam.

Alternatively, the term "cooperative database" can be used to describe database systems that incorporate techniques to aid users beyond returning direct answers. Such databases can, for example, give explanations as to why a query returns no or few results, detect and report some user misconception suggested by the query, provide justifications for returned answers, or relax query attributes to find "close" but non-precise answers. The fundamental goal is to extend databases towards reflecting the cooperative principle, and in particular, to avoid misleading users by omission of pertinent, contextual detail.
