= Michael Jackson (writer) =

Beer and whisky expert

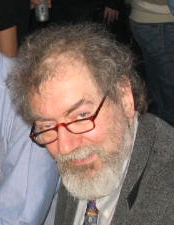
- Jackson at the 2004 Helsinki Beer Festival
- Born: 27 March 1942; Wetherby, West Riding of Yorkshire, England
- Died: 30 August 2007 (aged 65); London, England
- Known for: Beer and whisky reviewing and journalism
- Partner: Paddy Gunningham (1981—2007)
- Website: Michael Jackson's Beer Hunter; Rare Beer Club founderMichael Jackson Collection - Archive at Oxford Brookes University The Michael James Jackson Foundation for Brewing and Distilling - Funding technical education and career advancement for black, indigenous, and people of colour in the brewing and distilling industries

Michael James Jackson (27 March 1942 – 30 August 2007) was an English beer and whiskey writer. He was a regular contributor to a number of broadsheets, particularly The Independent and The Observer.

Jackson's books have sold over three million copies worldwide and have been translated into 18 languages. He is credited with helping to start a renaissance of interest in beer and breweries worldwide in the 1970s, particularly in the United States. He is also widely credited with popularising the idea of beer styles. His influential television series The Beer Hunter was shown in fifteen countries.

He was as well-versed in malt whisky as he was in beer, and his book Michael Jackson's Malt Whisky Companion (1989) was the best-selling book on the subject in the world.

Jackson developed Parkinson's disease a bit more than a decade before his death. He did not declare his illness until its symptoms caused some to think he was inebriated.

== Life ==
Jackson was born in Wetherby, West Riding of Yorkshire. His father had anglicised his Lithuanian Jewish surname Jakowitz to Jackson. The family moved to Leeds after World War II. He went to King James's Grammar School, Almondbury, and became a journalist, particularly being associated with Edinburgh, where he first encountered whisky. On his return to London, he briefly edited the advertising trade journal Campaign.

Jackson became known in beer circles in 1977 when his book The World Guide to Beer was first published. This was later translated into more than 10 languages and is still considered to be one of the most fundamental books on the subject. The modern theory of beer style is largely derived from this book, in which Jackson categorised a variety of beers from around the world in local style groups suggested by local customs and names.

His work had a particular influence on the popularisation of the brewing culture in North America, and in 1989 he hosted a television series entitled The Beer Hunter, which was shown on Channel 4 in the UK and on the Discovery Channel. It involved several episodes in which Jackson would visit a different country. Episodes featured beer barrels being lined with pitch, and iron foundry workers drinking "light" beer while they worked in hot conditions to quench thirst, practices which he knew were likely to be ended soon.

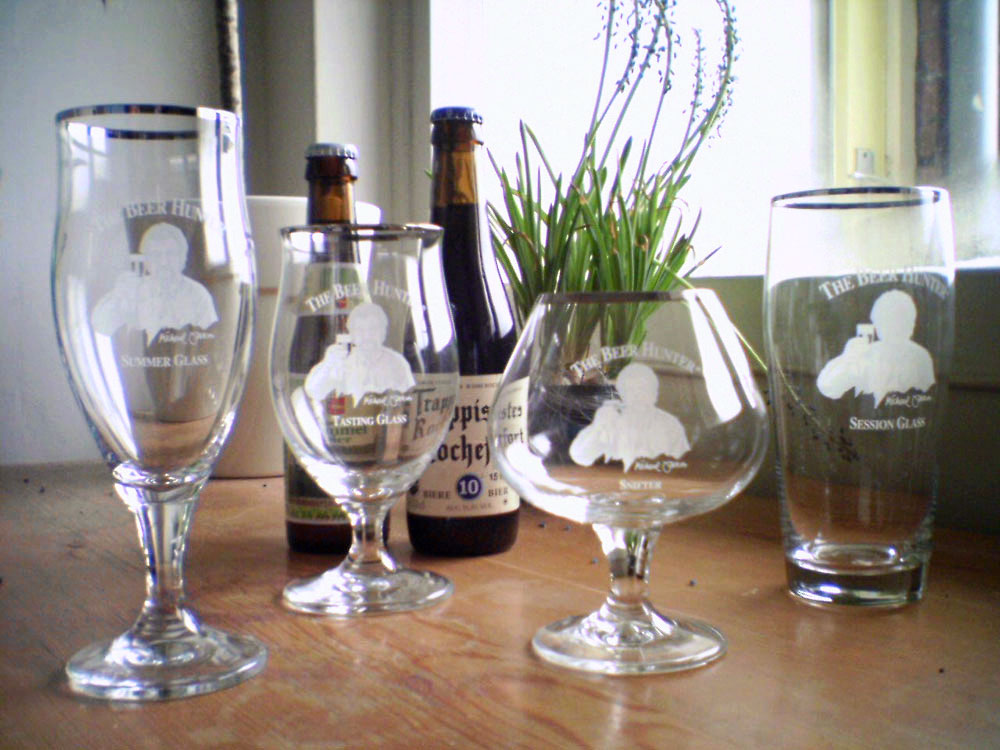
Michael Jackson's beer glassware (from left to right): summer glass, tasting glass, snifter, session glass

Jackson considered beer as a component of culture and described beers in their cultural context. Although he travelled around the world and discovered different beer cultures, he was especially fond of the Belgian beers. He was appointed to an honorary officer of the Ridderschap van de Roerstok in 1997 for his important contribution to the international success of the Belgian beers. This honour had previously only been given to brewers. In 1998, Jackson designed and sold 4 beer glasses called "Michael Jackson's Great Beer Glassware Set", each glass for a different type of beer, produced by Rizenhoff Crystal. Shortly after, Jackson also helped create and worked with the only beer club he ever endorsed, Michael Jackson's Rare Beer Club.

Jackson was a reviewer of whiskies, in his book The Malt Whisky Companion, he reviewed a large number of whiskies and gave them marks from 0–100, considering only those with a score above seventy-five worth purchasing. He received the award of "Master of the Quaich".

Apart from his work as a journalist and a critic, he was also a fan of rugby league.

Jackson disclosed in December 2006 that he had been diagnosed with Parkinson's disease over a decade earlier. He also had diabetes.

Jackson died of a heart attack in his home on the morning of 30 August 2007 at the age of 65. He was survived by his girlfriend of 26 years, Paddy Gunningham, and her daughter and grandchildren.

== Awards ==
- André Simon Award
- Glenfiddich Trophy, a British prize for culinary writers
- Honorary officer of the Ridderschap van de Roerstok, a Belgian award
- Gold Tankard of the British Guild of Beer Writers, given for his CD-ROMs
- Columnist of the Year, from the North American Guild of Beer Writers
- James Beard Award, 2006
- Keeper of the Quaich and Master of the Quaich, Scotch whisky industry awards
- Holder of the Haarikka (Finnish: Haarikanhaltija) 1995, Sahti Association award
- Achievement Award of the Institute for Fermentation Studies (US); first recipient
- Honorary Master beer judge, of the Beer Judge Certification Program (BJCP)

== Selected bibliography ==
- The English Pub (1976)
- The World Guide to Beer (1977)
- Exploring England. The Nationwide Touring Guide (1979)
- Pocket Guide to Beer; ISBN 0-671-72915-2 (1986)
- The World Guide to Whisky (1987)
- New World Guide to Beer (1988)
- Michael Jackson's Great Beers of Belgium; ISBN 0-7624-0403-5 (1991)
- Michael Jackson's Beer Companion; ISBN 0-7624-0772-7 (1997)
- Ultimate Beer (1998)
- Little Book on Beer (1998)
- Michael Jackson's Complete Guide to Single Malt Scotch, 4th ed.; editor: Sharon Lucas; Philadelphia, Pennsylvania: Running Press; ISBN 0-7624-0731-X (1999)
- Michael Jackson's Great Beer Guide; ed.: Sharon Lucas; DK; ISBN 0-7894-5156-5 (2000)
- Scotland and Its Whiskies (2001)
- The Malt Whisky Companion, Penguin Books; ISBN 978-1-4053-0234-0 (2004)
- Bar and Cocktail Party Book (2005)
- Whisky; ISBN 978-0-7513-4434-9 (2005)

== Multimedia ==
- The Beer Hunter (1989), set of two VHS tapes
- A Journey of Discovery: Tasting the Classic Malts with Michael Jackson (1992), VHS tapes
- The Beer Hunter (1995), CD-ROM about American beer culture
- World Beer Hunter (1996), CD-ROM about beer cultures around the world
- Beer Hunter: The Movie (2013), documentary film about Jackson's life

== See also ==
- Jim Murray (whisky writer)
