= Scotts of Stow =

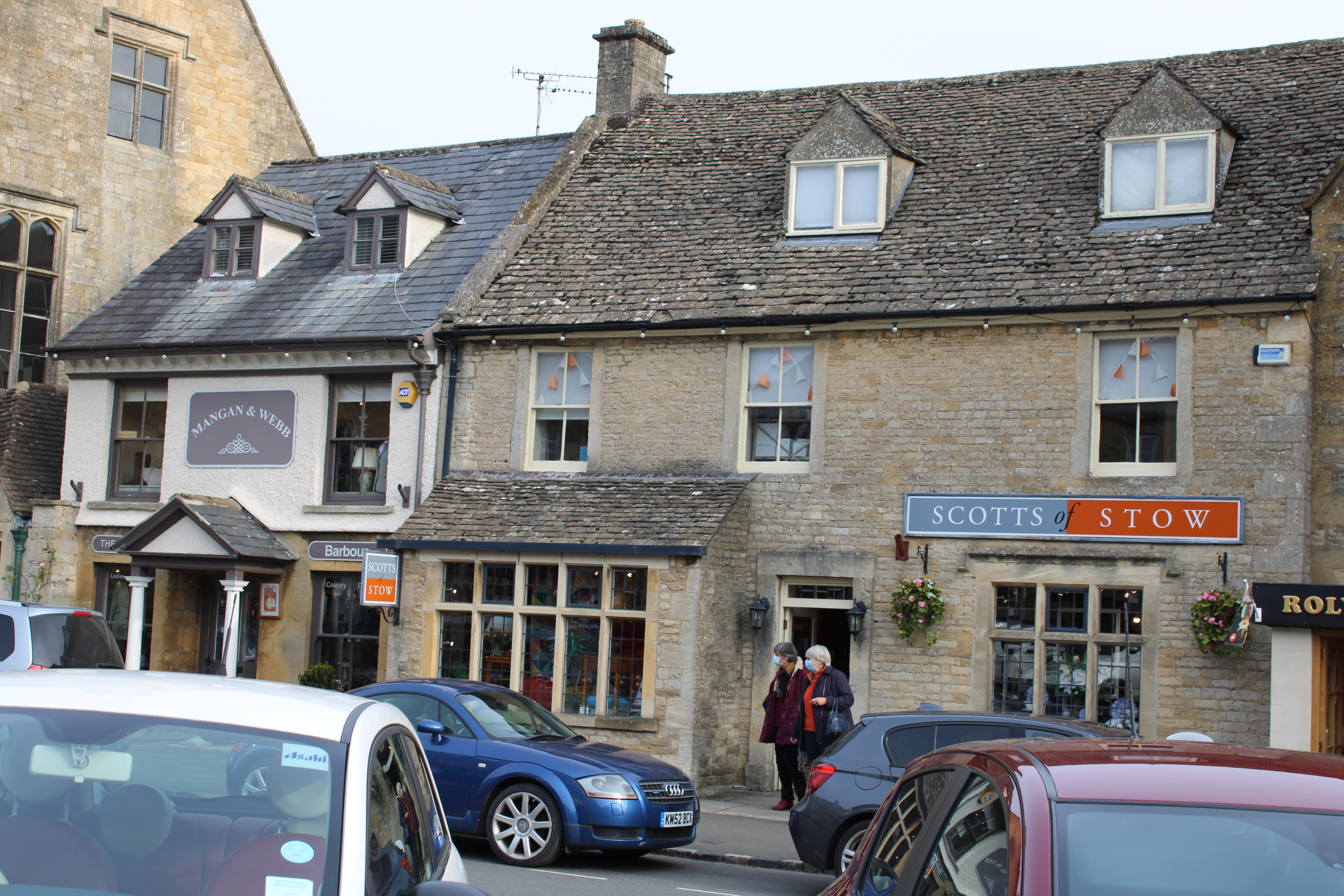
- Type: Private
- Industry: Online Retail
- Founded: In 1991 in Stow-on-the-Wold
- Headquarters: Stow-on-the-Wold, United Kingdom
- Products: Homeware, Kitchenware, Bedding and Garden & Outdoors
- Website: www.scottsofstow.co.uk/

Scotts of Stow is the flagship brand of the mail order company Scotts & Co. that sells homeware, kitchenware, bedding and garden and outdoors. Scotts of Stow has two shops in its founding location Stow-on-the-Wold in the Cotswolds.

== History ==
Robert Scott, an American businessman, moved to the UK in 1963 as national sales manager for the shaver company Remington Products. After Remington he was headhunted to a company which was later to become Russell Hobbs and at the age of 27 he became managing director. He then founded Scotcade, a direct marketing company that sold innovative products through the colour Sunday supplements that were popular in the late seventies and eighties. The business was bought by Courtaulds in 1982 and then sold to Grattan in 1985. Robert Scott semi-retired and moved to the Cotswolds, subsequently founding Scotts of Stow in 1991.

In 1996, the company was bought by Nigel Swabey, who runs the company alongside a range of other home catalogues including Bloom, Gift Discoveries and Expert Verdict. Scotts of Stow remains the flagship company of the parent group, Scotts & Co. Scotts of Stow is mentioned by Jeremy Clarkson in QI, where he states that his wife is a fan and they own various pieces purchased from Scotts.

== Current business ==
The Scotts of Stow Head Office is based in Groundwell, Swindon, Wiltshire near to the Cotswolds. Its main customer-facing store is located in Stow-on-the-Wold in the Cotswolds. The Head Office grounds are also home to its UK warehouse and discount outlet store. Scotts of Stow launch a new range in their catalogues and online 4 times a year.

On 14 December 2008 Scotts of Stow featured in a BBC News online article titled 'How Christmas works: Presents' and outlined the steps involved in shipping up to three million items ordered by customers in the run up to Christmas from their head office in Swindon.

On 8 January 2015 Scotts of Stow launched a 60 second TV commercial featuring over 200 products from the Scotts of Stow range and was advertised on ITV3, ITV Encore, Sky News and True Entertainment, daily until 31 January 2015.

== Awards ==
Award	Awarding Body	Year Awarded
Annual Sales of £15 - £30 million B2C	ECMOD Awards	2015
Annual Sales of £15 - £30 million B2C	ECMOD Awards	2013
Business-to-consumer awards: Homewares	ECMOD Awards	2008
Business-to-consumer awards: Homewares	ECMOD Awards	2007
