= Jacques Ferrand =

French physician

Jacques Ferrand was a French physician born around 1575 in Agen, France. He is famous for his treatise on melancholia, Traicte de l'essence et guerison de l'amour ou de la melancholie erotique (1610), an early psychological work on melancholia. It was for this work he was put on trial for by the Inquisition. The treatise on erotic melancholia may have been read by the French writer, Eugène Sue, whose character "Jacques Ferrand" ["Mysteries of Paris"], actually dies from an unrequited passion. Sue's father had been a distinguished doctor, and Sue himself was engaged in the medical profession when he was a young man.

In 1623, Ferrand wrote a book about the uses of bloodletting to cure "heartbreak" and "heartsickness" (figurative). He posited that the person being cured of heartbreak should be bled almost to the point of literal heart failure and should be plump and in good health beforehand.

== Selected works ==
- Traicté de l'essence et guerison de l'Amour ou de la melancholie erotique. Toulouse 1610.
  - modern French edition: Traité de l'essence et guérison de l'amour ou De la mélancolie érotique (1610). Édition, notes et traduction des citations grecques et latines par Gérard Jacquin et Éric Foulon, introduction de Gérard Jacquin, postface de Michel Gardaz. Paris: Anthropos, 2001, ISBN 2-7178-4174-1.
- De la maladie d'amour ou melancholie erotique. Discours curieux qui enseigne à cognoistre l'essence, les causes, les signes, & les remedes de ce mal fantastique. Paris 1623. Reprint Nendeln 1978 (The origins of psychiatry and psychoanalysis, 1). Digital copy at Google Books.
  - modern English edition: A treatise on Lovesickness. Transl. and ed. and with a critical introd. and notes by Donald A. Beecher and Massimo Ciavolella. Syracuse, NY: Syracuse University Press, 1990, ISBN 0-8156-2467-0.
  - modern French edition: De la maladie d'amour ou mélancolie érotique. Édition de Donald Beecher et Massimo Ciavolella. Paris: Éditions Classiques Garnier, 2010 (Textes de la Renaissance, 153), ISBN 978-2-8124-0061-2.
