= Edward Bysshe =

Edward Bysshe may refer to:

- Edward Bysshe (died 1655), member of Parliament for Bletchingley
- Edward Bysshe (died 1679), son of prec., member of Parliament, officer of arms and writer
- Edward Bysshe (author of The Art of English Poetry) (fl. 1702)
