= Wine club =

Wine membership program

A wine club is a developing extension of modern wine culture. Wine clubs are designed to provide customers with a series of wine bottles on a monthly or quarterly basis that they would otherwise have to find and purchase on their own. Wine clubs often behave in a themed manner, providing recipients with red wines, white wines, or a mixture of the two. Wine clubs are most frequently offered by vineyards or specialty wine shops, but they can also be found as independent bodies.

== History ==
Paul Kalemkiarian, Sr. created the Wine of the Month Club in 1972 while managing a small liquor store in Palos Verdes Estates, California. The Wine Club' opened in 1985 in Los Angeles.

In 1992, Gold Medal Wine Club was created by Linda and David Chesterfield, which focuses on featuring only boutique wineries in CA, OR, WA and internationally.

In 2003, 24% of all direct wine sales in the US were made through wine clubs. By 2006, there were approximately 800 official wine clubs in the United States. In the UK, in 2005, Direct Wines, a leader in wine clubs and wine deliveries, accounted for only 2.5% of domestic wine sales.

Many sommeliers created their own wine clubs to offer a way for their customers to buy directly from their lists (Ashley Ragovin with PourThis [now defunct], Brian McClintic with Viticole Wine, Rajat Parr with Glug Club, Ian Cauble with SommSelect). After the San Francisco Chronicle, KQED, Sunset Magazine, Forbes and The Wall Street Journal, The New York Times launched its own wine club in August 2009. The wine club was operated by Global Wine Company [now defunct]. In 2009, the California Department of Alcoholic Beverage Control ruled it illegal for third-party wine online vendors and newspapers wine clubs to benefit from wine sales since they do not hold the appropriate licence. Playboy launched its own wine club through a licensing agreement with internet wine merchant Barclay's Wine in 2012, and Martha Stewart launched her wine club in 2017, followed by NPR the same year.

In 2018, The Grape Reserve created a wine club focusing on lesser known wine varieties and regions. In 2019, the supermarket chain Aldi launched a wine club in the UK. In January 2020, the apéritif club startup Haus raised $4.5 million. Wine club software gradually became a feature of wine sales software, since most wine club sales happen through ecommerce websites.

In March 2020, the state of Utah authorized a state-controlled form of wine clubs.

== Variations and costs ==
Most wine clubs involve all red bottles, all white bottles, or a combination of both, known as "mixed" clubs. However, there have arisen many stylistic variations in what wines are shipped (including grape varietals and wine regions and how many bottles. Various wine clubs can have a set theme or many themes that alternate with each shipment. The cost range for wine clubs is vast since wine itself can range vastly in price. The type of wines being selected for club shipments and the number of bottles, as well as the frequency of shipping, will influence the overall cost of a wine club. Common wine clubs are created by wineries themselves, wine stores, online wine retailers, or large media companies such as the New York Times and the WSJ Wine Club, among others.

A wine club can offer access to high-end-wine culture. Some clubs like Winc (formerly Club W) and Firstleaf hand out a short quiz to its new members before suggesting bottles based on their answers. The Plonk Wine Club and Vegan Wines focus on biodynamic and organic wines. Wine of England and Club Vini only include wine from one particular country. Many wine clubs curate their selections by themes. The Napa Valley Reserve is an exclusive, $150,000-membership-fee wine club.

== See also ==
- Wine tasting descriptors
- Wine accessory
- Rare Beer Club
- Whisky club
