= Maugersbury =

Coordinates: 51.925°N 1.712°W

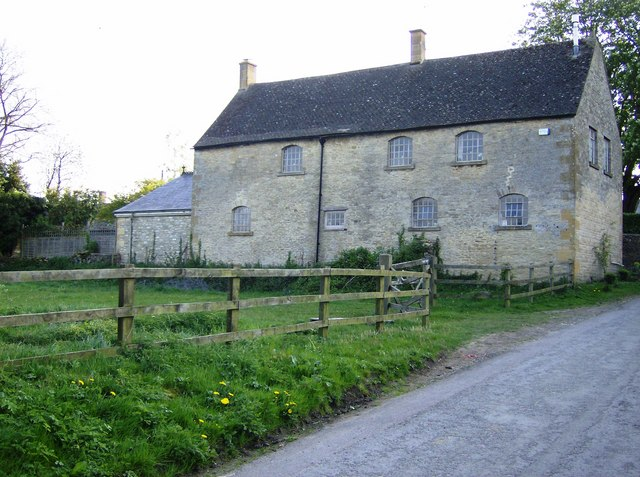
- First house in Maugersbury

- Location within Gloucestershire
- Population: 149 (2001 Census)
- Civil parish: Maugersbury
- District: Cotswold
- Shire county: Gloucestershire
- Region: South West
- Country: England
- Sovereign state: United Kingdom
- Post town: CHELTENHAM
- Postcode district: GL54
- Dialling code: 01451
- Police: Gloucestershire
- Fire: Gloucestershire
- Ambulance: South Western
- UK Parliament: North Cotswolds

Maugersbury is a village and civil parish in Gloucestershire, England. Situated less than a mile south-east of the market town of Stow-on-the-Wold and approximately 18 miles (29 km) east of its post town, Cheltenham, Maugersbury lies within the Cotswolds, an Area of Outstanding Natural Beauty. At the 2001 United Kingdom census, the parish had a population of 149.

== History ==
The town is said to have originated as an Iron Age fort on its defensive hill top position. There are many similar forts in the area, and Stone Age and Bronze Age burial mounds are also common.

Maugersbury is located less than a mile from Stow-on-the-Wold, which was originally called Edwardstow after the town's patron saint Edward (possibly Edward the Martyr). During Saxon times it is likely that Maugersbury was the primary settlement of the parish, before Stow was built as a marketplace by the Normans in 1107 AD, to be nearer the cross roads. Maugersbury was listed as MalgeresberiAe in the Domesday Book of 1086.

The Maugersbury Enclosure Bill was passed in 1766, and later the village was the location of the Stow on the Wold Union Workhouse.

== Governance ==
Maugersbury is in the Stow ward of the Cotswold District Council, represented by Liberal Democrat Councillor Dilys Neill. It is part of the constituency of North Cotswolds, represented in parliament by Conservative MP Sir Geoffrey Clifton-Brown. It was part of the South West England constituency of the European Parliament prior to Britain leaving the European Union in January 2020.

== Sources ==
- Mills, A. D. (1998), Dictionary of English Place-Names, Oxford University Press, ISBN 0-19-280074-4
