= Grade II* listed buildings in Forest of Dean =

There are over 20,000 Grade II* listed buildings in England. This page is a list of these buildings in the district of Forest of Dean in Gloucestershire.

== Forest of Dean ==
Name	Location	Type	Completed (Note: The date given is the date used by Historic England as significant for the initial building or that of an important part in the structure's description.)	Date designated	Grid ref. (Note: Sometimes known as OSGB36, the grid reference is based on the British national grid reference system used by the Ordnance Survey.) Geo-coordinates	Entry number (Note: The "List Entry Number" is a unique number assigned to each listed building and scheduled monument by Historic England.)	Image
Blakeney United Reformed Church	Blakeney, Awre, Forest of Dean	Schoolroom	1849	25 January 1985	SO6686607026; 51°45′39″N 2°28′53″W	1186386	Blakeney United Reformed Church More images
Drakes House	Gatcombe, Awre, Forest of Dean	House	17th century	25 January 1985	SO6795905443; 51°44′48″N 2°27′56″W	1299206	Drakes House More images
Fieldhouse	Awre, Forest of Dean	Farmhouse	Medieval	25 January 1985	SO6991808191; 51°46′18″N 2°26′15″W	1186367	Upload Photo
Guy Hall Farmhouse	Awre, Forest of Dean	Farmhouse	16th century or earlier	25 January 1985	SO7050208481; 51°46′27″N 2°25′44″W	1186400	Upload Photo
Hagloe House	Hagloe, Awre, Forest of Dean	House	Early 18th century	25 January 1985	SO6862406375; 51°45′19″N 2°27′21″W	1299207	Hagloe House More images
Oaklands Park	Oaklands Park, Awre, Forest of Dean	Country House	c. 1830	25 January 1985	SO6787909434; 51°46′58″N 2°28′01″W	1186363	Oaklands Park More images
Market Cross	Aylburton, Forest of Dean	Market Cross	14th century	7 March 1988	SO6172401788; 51°42′49″N 2°33′19″W	1186583	Market Cross More images
Blaisdon Hall	Blaisdon, Forest of Dean	House	1876	4 July 1985	SO6980416975; 51°51′02″N 2°26′23″W	1121880	Blaisdon Hall More images
Church of St Mary the Virgin	Flaxley, Blaisdon, Forest of Dean	Parish Church	1856	4 July 1985	SO6884915338; 51°50′09″N 2°27′13″W	1186458	Church of St Mary the Virgin More images
Bromsberrow Place	Bromsberrow, Forest of Dean	Farmhouse	Third Quarter 18th century	2 October 1954	SO7571234275; 52°00′23″N 2°21′19″W	1341928	Bromsberrow Place More images
Church of St Mary	Bromsberrow, Forest of Dean	Parish Church	13th century	2 October 1954	SO7422433669; 52°00′03″N 2°22′37″W	1303740	Church of St Mary More images
Church of St Andrew	Churcham, Forest of Dean	Parish Church	12th century	23 September 1955	SO7685918204; 51°51′43″N 2°20′15″W	1305341	Church of St Andrew More images
Old Farmhouse	Coleford, Forest of Dean	Farmhouse	Late 15th century	24 September 1984	SO5595810476; 51°47′28″N 2°38′24″W	1186303	Upload Photo
Corse Court	Corse, Forest of Dean	Farmhouse	14th century	2 October 1954	SO7880326468; 51°56′11″N 2°18′35″W	1341953	Corse Court More images
Pound Farmhouse	Tillers Green, Dymock, Forest of Dean	Farmhouse	First half 17th century	2 October 1954	SO6965432530; 51°59′25″N 2°26′36″W	1155980	Upload Photo
Preston Court	Preston, Dymock, Forest of Dean	Country House	Late 16th century or very early 17th century	2 October 1954	SO6794634583; 52°00′31″N 2°28′06″W	1303085	Preston Court More images
Smith Monument, in the Churchyard, about 4m west of South Porch, Church of St Mary	Dymock, Forest of Dean	Chest Tomb	1746	17 March 1987	SO7003031223; 51°58′43″N 2°26′16″W	1078510	Upload Photo
Bee Shelter approx. 50m East of St Mary the Virgin	Hartpury, Forest of Dean	Shelter	1847-1852	18 October 1985	SO7895622990; 51°54′18″N 2°18′26″W	1341879	Bee Shelter approx. 50m East of St Mary the Virgin More images
Hartpury House	Hartpury, Forest of Dean	Country House/College	Early 19th century	18 October 1985	SO7875922982; 51°54′18″N 2°18′37″W	1305312	Hartpury House More images
Sloper Monument, in the Churchyard, about 21m north of West End of the Chancel, Church of St Mary	Hartpury, Forest of Dean	Chest Tomb	1703	18 October 1985	SO7806723668; 51°54′40″N 2°19′13″W	1172175	Sloper Monument, in the Churchyard, about 21m north of West End of the Chancel, Church of St Mary More images
The Hill	Hartpury, Forest of Dean	House	17th century	18 October 1985	SO7789225831; 51°55′50″N 2°19′23″W	1078662	Upload Photo
Tithe Barn, Hartpury Court	Hartpury, Forest of Dean	Barn	Mid 19th century	2 October 1954	SO7798523642; 51°54′39″N 2°19′17″W	1172209	Tithe Barn, Hartpury Court More images
Church of St Mary Magdalen	Hewelsfield General, Hewelsfield and Brockweir, Forest of Dean	Anglican Church	12th century	7 August 1954	SO5676002135; 51°42′59″N 2°37′38″W	1186584	Church of St Mary Magdalen More images
Malt House	Brockweir, Hewelsfield and Brockweir, Forest of Dean	House	1988	7 August 1954	SO5398001141; 51°42′26″N 2°40′03″W	1186590	Malt House More images
Monument to Wife of George Geo--- in the Churchyard about 7m south of the Tower to the Church of St Mary Magdalen	Hewelsfield General, Hewelsfield and Brockweir, Forest of Dean	Chest Tomb	Late 17th century or early 18th century	7 March 1988	SO5676302121; 51°42′58″N 2°37′38″W	1186587	Upload Photo
Church of St Edward the Confessor	Kempley, Forest of Dean	Chapel of Ease	1902-3	17 March 1987	SO6712829609; 51°57′50″N 2°28′47″W	1156349	Church of St Edward the Confessor More images
Court House	Littledean, Forest of Dean	Prison	1788-91	23 September 1955	SO6732513811; 51°49′19″N 2°28′32″W	1186859	Upload Photo
Court House, Walls and Gatehouse	Littledean, Forest of Dean	Porters Lodge	1788-91	4 July 1985	SO6732413833; 51°49′20″N 2°28′32″W	1299170	Upload Photo
Dean Hall	Littledean, Forest of Dean	House	Earlier than 17th century	23 September 1955	SO6724013097; 51°48′56″N 2°28′36″W	1186495	Upload Photo
Mill at Gun's Mills	Flaxley, Forest of Dean	Blast Furnace	1628	23 September 1955	SO6751115958; 51°50′29″N 2°28′23″W	1186479	Mill at Gun's Mills More images
Church of All Saints	Longhope, Forest of Dean	Parish Church	12th century	4 July 1985	SO6845819794; 51°52′33″N 2°27′35″W	1299178	Church of All Saints More images
Sarah Siddons' House (the Old House)	Lydbrook, Forest of Dean	House	Early 18th century	12 December 1953	SO5981116117; 51°50′32″N 2°35′05″W	1299249	Sarah Siddons' House (the Old House) More images
Monument to Dorothy Berro--- in the Churchyard About 8m north of North Corner of Aisle Chapel of the Church of St Mary	Lydney, Forest of Dean	Chest Tomb	Early 17th century	7 March 1988	SO6333902540; 51°43′13″N 2°31′56″W	1299110	Upload Photo
Monument to Margerye North in the Churchyard About 22m north-east of North East Corner of Chancel of the Church of St Mary	Lydney, Forest of Dean	Chest Tomb	Early 17th century	7 March 1988	SO6335902556; 51°43′14″N 2°31′55″W	1186606	Upload Photo
Naas House	Lydney, Forest of Dean	House	Early 18th century	7 August 1954	SO6488601769; 51°42′49″N 2°30′35″W	1186613	Naas House More images
Purton Manor Farmhouse	Purton, Lydney, Forest of Dean	Farmhouse	1954	7 August 1954	SO6706504525; 51°44′18″N 2°28′42″W	1186617	Upload Photo
Unidentified Monument in the Churchyard about 12m north of Nave North Wall of the Church of St Mary	Lydney, Forest of Dean	Chest Tomb	17th century	7 March 1988	SO6332002551; 51°43′14″N 2°31′57″W	1121937	Upload Photo
Church of St Michael and All Angels	Abenhall, Mitcheldean, Forest of Dean	Parish Church	14th century	23 September 1955	SO6713217429; 51°51′16″N 2°28′43″W	1299146	Church of St Michael and All Angels More images
International Stores	Newent, Forest of Dean	Courtyard	15th century	18 October 1985	SO7225425863; 51°55′50″N 2°24′18″W	1078677	Upload Photo
Clearwell Castle	Clearwell, Newland, Forest of Dean	Country House	1727	24 September 1984	SO5701207746; 51°46′00″N 2°37′28″W	1186324	Clearwell Castle More images
The Old House	Newnham on Severn, Forest of Dean	Detached House	16th century	10 January 1955	SO6919911973; 51°48′20″N 2°26′53″W	1101482	Upload Photo
Church of St Anne	Oxenhall, Forest of Dean	Parish Church	14th century	2 October 1954	SO7114126728; 51°56′18″N 2°25′16″W	1304818	Church of St Anne More images
Crooke's Farmhouse	Oxenhall, Forest of Dean	Farmhouse	15th century	24 March 1976	SO7044626071; 51°55′56″N 2°25′52″W	1078603	Upload Photo
Bury Court Farmhouse	Redmarley D'Abitot, Forest of Dean	Farmhouse	12th century	2 October 1954	SO7597332851; 51°59′37″N 2°21′05″W	1078523	Upload Photo
Church of St John the Baptist	Ruardean, Forest of Dean	Parish Church	12th century	23 September 1955	SO6211517690; 51°51′23″N 2°33′05″W	1100629	Church of St John the Baptist More images
Tithe Barn, Highleadon Court	Rudford and Highleadon, Forest of Dean	Threshing Barn	15th century OR EARLY 16th century	18 October 1985	SO7701624437; 51°55′05″N 2°20′08″W	1152574	Upload Photo
Bigsweir Bridge	Bigsweir, St. Briavels, Forest of Dean	Road Bridge	1826/29	7 March 1988	SO5387005105; 51°44′34″N 2°40′10″W	1186622	Bigsweir Bridge More images
Monument to Elizabeth Butler in the Churchyard about 3m south of the South West Corner of the South Transept to the Church	St Briavels, Forest of Dean	Chest Tomb	Mid C17 Sandstone	7 March 1988	SO5586804636; 51°44′19″N 2°38′26″W	1186627	Upload Photo
Monument to James Gough in the Churchyard about 15m south of the Chancel Wall of the Church of St Mary	St Briavels Forest of Dean	Chest Tomb	Late 17th century	7 March 1988	SO5587304629; 51°44′19″N 2°38′26″W	1337662	Upload Photo
Mork Farmhouse	Mork, St Briavels, Forest of Dean	Farmhouse	C16/C17	7 August 1954	SO5537805595; 51°44′50″N 2°38′52″W	1186639	Upload Photo
Church of St James	Staunton, Forest of Dean	Parish Church	12th century	2 October 1954	SO7819329202; 51°57′39″N 2°19′08″W	1156776	Church of St James More images
Barn at Taynton House	Taynton, Forest of Dean	Barn	1695	2 October 1954	SO7223222184; 51°53′51″N 2°24′18″W	1078575	Upload Photo
Church of St Lawrence	Taynton, Forest of Dean	Schoolroom	1825	2 October 1954	SO7372622147; 51°53′50″N 2°23′00″W	1152696	Church of St Lawrence More images
Farm Store and Cider House, North West of Taynton House	Taynton, Forest of Dean	Cider House	LATE 17th century or early 18th century	2 October 1954	SO7220522163; 51°53′50″N 2°24′19″W	1341921	Upload Photo
Stables, North East of Taynton House and Wall and Wall and Gates Connecting to House	Taynton, Forest of Dean	Gate	Late 17th century or early 18th century	2 October 1954	SO7225722178; 51°53′51″N 2°24′17″W	1078576	Upload Photo
Church of St Mary and St Peter	Tidenham, Forest of Dean	Anglican Church	13th century	7 August 1954	ST5559195847; 51°39′35″N 2°38′36″W	1366270	Church of St Mary and St Peter More images
Mead Farmhouse	Sedbury, Tidenham, Forest of Dean	Farmhouse	Mid/late 18th century	7 August 1954	ST5492094567; 51°38′53″N 2°39′11″W	1100607	Upload Photo
Sedbury Park	Sedbury, Tidenham, Forest of Dean	Country House	19th century	7 August 1954	ST5535193384; 51°38′15″N 2°38′48″W	1348351	Sedbury Park More images
Stroat Farmhouse	Stroat, Tidenham, Forest of Dean	Farmhouse	c. 1600	7 August 1954	ST5741897940; 51°40′43″N 2°37′02″W	1099177	Upload Photo
Cruck Barn at Upleadon Court, to North West of House	Upleadon, Forest of Dean	Barn	17th century	18 October 1985	SO7683126936; 51°56′26″N 2°20′18″W	1078589	Upload Photo
Hayes	West Dean, Forest of Dean	Farmhouse	Late 16th century	24 September 1984	SO6580406102; 51°45′09″N 2°29′48″W	1186357	Upload Photo
Church of St Peter and St Paul	Westbury-on-Severn, Forest of Dean	Church	Early 14th century	4 July 1985	SO7171713886; 51°49′22″N 2°24′42″W	1101724	Church of St Peter and St Paul More images
Monument to Daughter of William Smart in the Churchyard about 4m south-east of South East Corner of Aisle to the Church	Woolaston, Forest of Dean	Chest Tomb	17th century	7 March 1988	ST5868899339; 51°41′29″N 2°35′57″W	1101489	Upload Photo
Monument to Elizabeth Woodrofe in the Churchyard about 10m south-east of the South East Corner of the Chancel	Woolaston, Forest of Dean	Chest Tomb	Mid 17th century	7 March 1988	ST5870199338; 51°41′29″N 2°35′56″W	1299105	Upload Photo
Monument to William Smart in the Churchyard about 12m south-east of the South East Corner of the Aisle of the Church	Woolaston, Forest of Dean	Chest Tomb	1666	7 March 1988	ST5868899337; 51°41′29″N 2°35′57″W	1186670	Upload Photo
