= Hewelsfield =

Village in Gloucestershire, England

Coordinates: 51.7162°N 2.6273°W

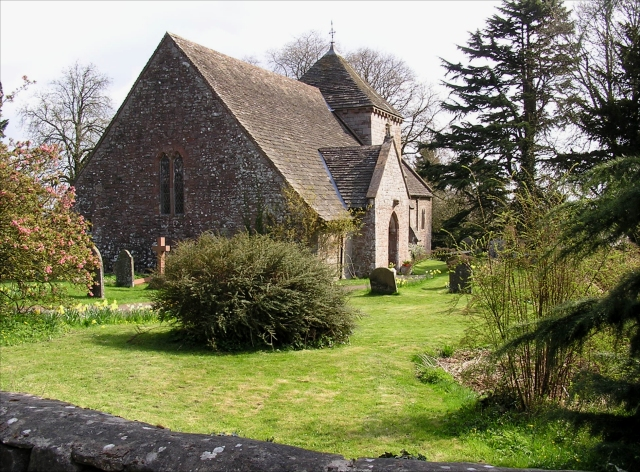
- Hewelsfield Parish Church

- Location within Gloucestershire
- OS grid reference: SO567020
- Civil parish: Hewelsfield and Brockweir
- District: Forest of Dean
- Shire county: Gloucestershire
- Region: South West
- Country: England
- Sovereign state: United Kingdom
- Post town: Lydney
- Postcode district: GL15
- Police: Gloucestershire
- Fire: Gloucestershire
- Ambulance: South Western
- UK Parliament: Forest of Dean

Hewelsfield is a village in Hewelsfield and Brockweir civil parish, in the Forest of Dean district of Gloucestershire, England.

The village is located 6 miles south of Coleford and 5 miles north-east of Chepstow, close to the Wye valley and partly within an Area of Outstanding Natural Beauty.

== History ==
The area was known in the Anglo-Saxon period as Hiwoldestone. It was included by William the Conqueror in the Royal Forest of Dean, but by the 12th century was established as a village, with a church. Ancient routes running up from the River Severn at Alvington and Woolaston met at Hewelsfield village and continued to the nearby village of St. Briavels. In 1266 the manor of Hewelsfield was granted to Tintern Abbey, which retained it until the Dissolution in 1536. Together with the abbey grange at Brockweir, the manor was then granted to Henry Somerset, 2nd Earl of Worcester.

There is evidence of a small castle motte close to the church, and earthworks close to the castle suggest either a deserted medieval village or field boundaries. A separate ancient field system exists close to Hewelsfield Court.

The village was designated a Conservation Area in 1990.

== Church of St. Mary Magdalen ==
The parish church of St. Mary Magdalen has a Norman nave; an Early English chancel (restored in the 19th century); and a north transept enlarged in the 16th century. The churchyard is circular in form, which is often taken to suggest a pagan site or Celtic foundation.

== Hewelsfield Common ==
The area known as Hewelsfield Common, west of the village and sloping down to the River Wye, was occupied and developed in a piecemeal fashion by squatters in the 18th and early 19th centuries. Later in the 19th century, encouraged partly by the opening of the Wye Valley Railway on the Monmouthshire side of the river in 1876, private residents and retired people settled in the area and enlarged the cottages or built new houses.

== Village Community Shop ==
Hewelsfield, together with Brockweir, is served by the Brockweir and Hewelsfield Village Shop and Café, a non-profit making community enterprise, staffed by volunteers from the local community.

== Listed buildings in Hewelsfield ==
Listed buildings in the village of Hewelsfield are listed in the tables below, with links to the relevant Historic England list entry. Listed buildings in the village Brockweir are given in the Wikipedia article on Brockweir. For the purposes of the tables, 'Hewelsfield' is taken to include all buildings in the Civil Parish of Hewelsfield and Brockweir to the east of Offa's Dyke; 'Brockweir' is taken to include all buildings in the Civil Parish of Hewelsfield and Brockweir to the west of Offa's Dyke.

Listed Buildings in Hewelsfield: excluding monuments in the churchyard of St Mary Magdalen
Building name	List Entry Number	Grade
Church of St Mary Magdalen	1186584	II*
Boundary Wall, Lych Gate and Stiles to Churchyard to Church of St Mary Magdalen	1323151	II
Hewelsfield Court	1186589	II
Barn Attached to North West Corner of Hewelsfield Court	1121555	II
Barn About 35 metres West of Hewelsfield Court	1299143	II
Touchway Barn	1186676	II
Pair of Lime Kilns in Hewelsfield Cliff Wood	1186594	II
Milestone at Grid Reference 562028	1121517	II

Listed Buildings in Hewelsfield: monuments in the churchyard of St Mary Magdalen
Building name	List Entry Number	Grade
Monument to Dinah Man in the Churchyard; About 7 metres South East of the Porch to the Church of St Mary Magdalen	1120785	II
Unidentified Monument in the Churchyard; About 11 metres South of the Nave of the Church of St Mary Magdalen	1120790	II
Unidentified Monument in the Churchyard; About 11 metres South of the Tower to the Church of St Mary Magdalen	1120797	II
Monument to John Phillips in the Churchyard; About 8 metres South of the Priest's Door to the Chancel of the Church of St Mary Magdalen	1121146	II
Unidentified Monument in the Churchyard; About 12 1/2 metres South of the South East Corner of the Chancel to the Church of St Mary Magdalen	1121548	II
Unidentified Monument in the Churchyard; About 5 metres South East of the Porch to the Churchyard of St Mary Magdalen	1186585	II
Unidentified Monument in the Churchyard; About 8 metres South of the Nave to the Church of St Mary Magdalen	1186586	II
Monument to Wife of George Geo--- in the Churchyard; About 7 metres South of the Tower to the Church of St Mary Magdalen	1186587	II
Monument to Alexander Morley or Moyley in the Churchyard; About 13 metres South of the Porch to the Church of St Mary Magdalen	1186588	II
Monument to Ann Pitcher in the Churchyard; Circa 1 1/2 metres South of Nave Wall of the Church of St Mary Magdalen	1249770	II
Monument to Ann Pritchard in the Churchyard; Circa 11 metres South of Chancel Wall to the Church of St Mary Magdalen	1249771	II
Monument to Arthur Pitcher in the Churchyard; Circa 2 metres South of Nave Wall of the Church of St Mary Magdalen	1263579	II
Monument to John Jane in the Churchyard; Circa 4 metres South of Chancel Wall to the Church of St Mary Magdalen	1263580	II
Monument to ---M Wade in the Churchyard; About 2 metres South of Nave Wall of the Church of St Mary Magdalen	1299140	II
Monument to Henery ----- in the Churchyard; About 11 metres South of the Nave to the Church of St Mary Magdalen	1299141	II
Monument to Son of John Jane in the Churchyard; About 2 1/2 metres South of Chancel Wall to Church of St Mary Magdalen	1299142	II
Monument to Elizabeth Brown in the Churchyard; About 2 1/2 metres South East of Porch to Church of St Mary Magdalen	1323177	II
