= Taynton =

Taynton may refer to:

- Taynton, Gloucestershire, England, a village and civil parish
- Taynton, Oxfordshire, England, a village and civil parish
- Taynton Limestone Formation, a geographical formation in Oxfordshire, England
