= Hewelsfield and Brockweir =

Civil parish in Gloucestershire, England

Coordinates: 51.715°N 2.640°W

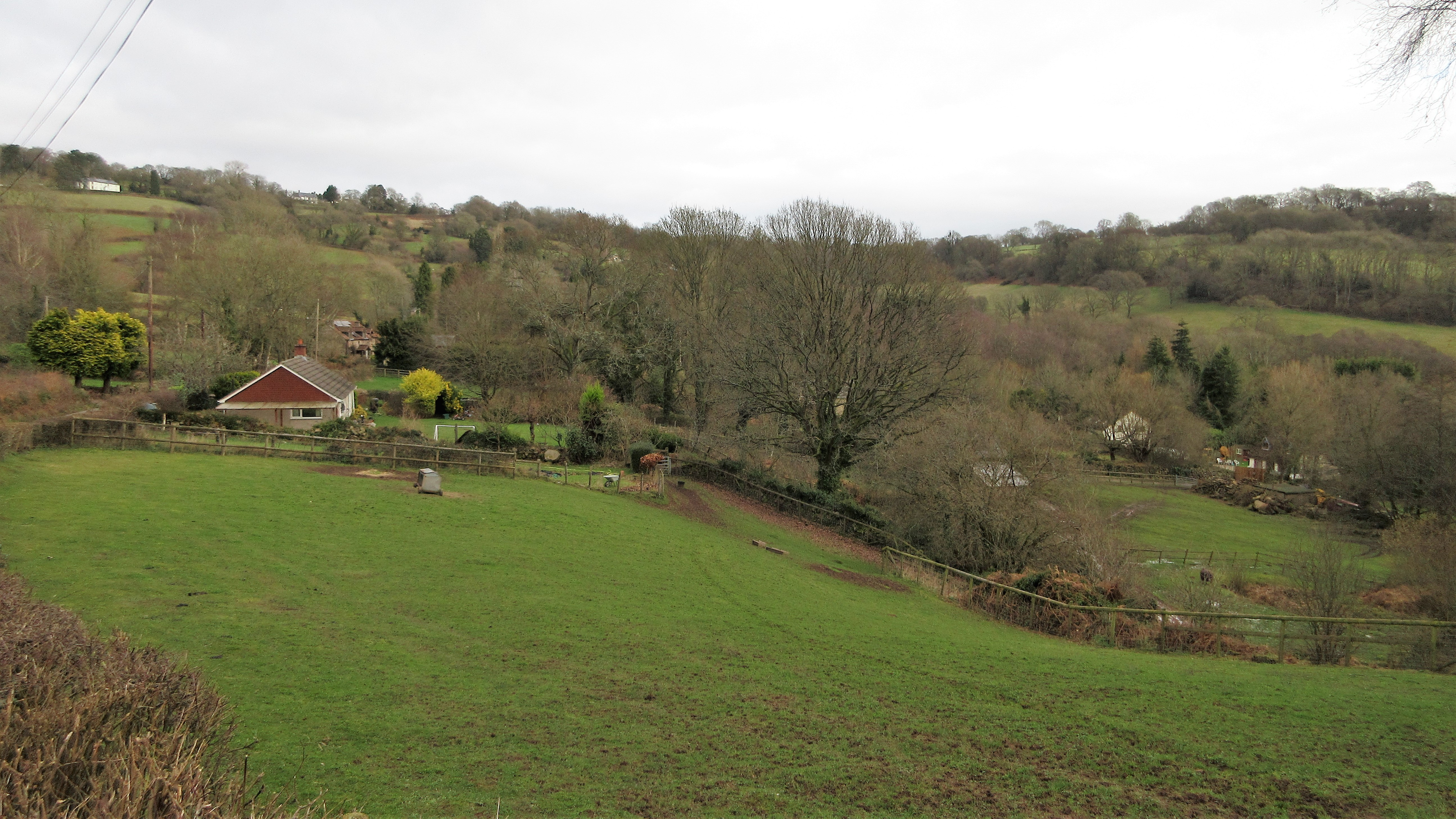
- Hewelsfield Common

- Location within Gloucestershire
- Area: 8.0302 km^{2} (3.1005 sq mi)
- Population: 484 (2011 Census)
  - Density: 60/km^{2} (160/sq mi)
- OS grid reference: SO558020
- Civil parish: Hewelsfield and Brockweir
- District: Forest of Dean
- Shire county: Gloucestershire
- Region: South West
- Country: England
- Sovereign state: United Kingdom
- Post town: Lydney
- Postcode district: GL15
- Post town: Chepstow
- Postcode district: NP16
- Police: Gloucestershire
- Fire: Gloucestershire
- Ambulance: South Western
- UK Parliament: Forest of Dean
- Website: Hewelsfield and Brockweir Parish Council

Hewelsfield and Brockweir is a civil parish in the Forest of Dean district, in the county of Gloucestershire, England. The parish was called Hewelsfield until 1994. It contains two distinct villages, Hewelsfield and Brockweir, with scattered settlement on Hewelsfield common.

== History ==
Until 1842 Hewelsfield parish was in three parts. The main part comprised farmland on high ground, having Hewelsfield village as its centre. Below and to the west, a detached part of only a few acres, Cutt's Orchard, lay on the north side of Brockweir brook. On the bank of the Wye another detached part included the part of Brockweir village lying north of Brockweir brook. The part of the village south of the brook (which included the Moravian Church) was in Woolaston parish.

In 1842 an adjoining tract of extraparochial land, which became known as Hewelsfield common, was added to Hewelsfield for civil parish purposes, uniting the detached parts of the parish. The parish was further enlarged in 1935 by the addition of an arm of Woolaston parish, extending down the south side of the valley of Brockweir brook to the Wye at the village of Brockweir.

On 27 May 1994 the parish was renamed from "Hewelsfield" to "Hewelsfield and Brockweir".

== Parish council ==
Hewelsfield and Brockweir Parish Council consists of 7 Councillors and a Clerk. It meets monthly, except in August, at the Brockweir and Hewelsfield Village Shop.

== Listed Buildings ==
The parish contains 36 listed buildings: two churches (St Mary Magdalen, Hewelsfield and Brockweir Moravian Church), a churchyard wall, 17 chest tombs (in the churchyard of St Mary Magdalen, Hewelsfield), a pair of limekilns, a milepost, two bridges and 12 houses.

Lists of the listed buildings can be found in the Wikipedia articles on the villages of Hewelsfield and Brockweir.

== Scheduled Monuments ==
The parish contains six scheduled monuments: five sections of Offa's Dyke, and Hewelsfield Motte.

Scheduled Monuments in Hewelsfield and Brockweir civil parish
Monument name	List Entry Number
Offa's Dyke: section 65m north of Brook House	1020596
Offa's Dyke: section in Cutt's Orchard, 230m south east of Brook House	1020597
Offa's Dyke: section on Madgett Hill, 290m south east of Brook House	1020598
Offa's Dyke: section on Madgett Hill, 380m south east of Brook House	1020599
Offa's Dyke: section on Madgett Hill, 580m west of The Old Mill	1020600
Motte Castle 57m south-west of Church of St Mary Magdalene	1407096

== Community Shop ==
The parish is served by the Brockweir and Hewelsfield Village Shop and Café, a non-profit making community enterprise, staffed by volunteers from the local community.
