= Flaxley =

Coordinates: 51.834024°N 2.449576°W

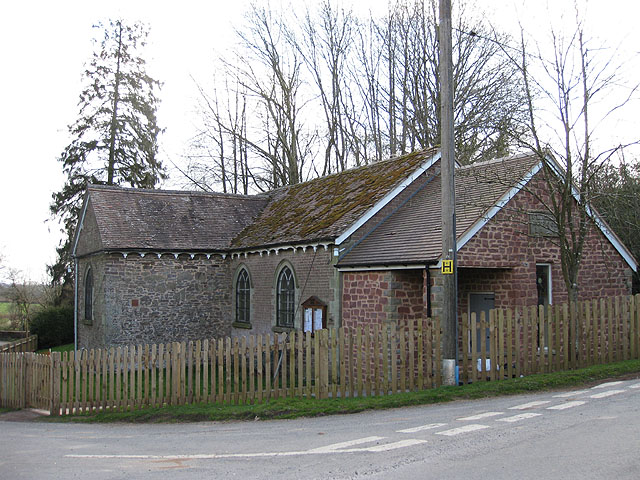
- Village Hall, Flaxley

- Location within Gloucestershire
- OS grid reference: SO691151
  - London: 104 miles (167 km)
- Civil parish: Blaisdon
- District: Forest of Dean
- Shire county: Gloucestershire
- Region: South West
- Country: England
- Sovereign state: United Kingdom
- Post town: Newnham
- Postcode district: GL14
- Dialling code: 01452
- Police: Gloucestershire
- Fire: Gloucestershire
- Ambulance: South Western
- UK Parliament: Forest of Dean

Flaxley is a small settlement and former civil parish, now in the parish of Blaisdon, in the Forest of Dean, Gloucestershire, England. It is located in between the larger villages of Westbury-on-Severn and Mitcheldean. In 1931 the parish had a population of 87.

== History ==
The origin of the place-name is from the Old English words fleax and leah meaning place where flax is grown; the place-name appears as Flaxlea in 1163.

Today, Flaxley is wooded but it has a strong industrial past, notably of iron furnaces, forges and water mills. The Forest of Dean was an important medieval ironworking region, and the earliest forge in Flaxley is recorded in the 12th century. Westbury Brook was the site of five water mills, and Gun's Mills, at Shapridge to the north-west of Flaxley, was one of the main gun foundries of the English Civil War era. A blast furnace was built there in 1629 by Sir John Wintour. Operating until 1743 and was named after William Gunne, the owner of an earlier mill on the site. Gun's Mill was used primarily for armament production and in 1629, the Crown ordered that 610 guns were to be made there and sent to the Netherlands, but many were subsequently used by both sides in the English Civil War. The furnace was destroyed by order of Parliament in 1650 but it was rebuilt in 1683 and remained in use until c.1743 when it became a paper mill. The latter closed in 1879 but several of the furnace's buildings remain and the site is now a scheduled monument as it is the finest remaining example of a charcoal blast furnace from this period in the country.

Flaxley is also famous for its old Cistercian abbey founded between 1148 and 1154 by Roger, Earl of Hereford, at the spot where his father, Miles of Gloucester, was killed whilst out hunting. The abbey and its monks were initially favoured by the Crown and it was granted land (by Henry II in 1158) as well as timber and woodlands (by Henry III in 1227) The abbey survived as a monastic entity until the Dissolution in 1536-37 when its lands and manor were granted to Sir William Kingston, the Constable of the Tower of London (who supervised the execution of Anne Boleyn). The present Church of St Mary, with its contrasting red and grey Forest stone, was built in 1856. It has a richly decorated interior and a very elaborate font made of Painswick (Cotswold) stone with marble columns on octagonal steps.

Lying just west of Flaxley in Welshbury Woods, is Welshbury Hill. This Iron Age hill fort has impressive triple defensive rampart and ditches on its south and west sides with a single bank and ditch on the north and east and an entrance. It lies on Forestry Commission land, and is accessible to the public. It has never been excavated but in recent years it has been damaged by forestry operations and to minimise this the Forestry Commission has reverted to using horses on the site. Two interesting archaeological finds are associated with Welshbury, firstly a Celtic electrum coin which was found in fields nearby and depicts a stag or horse and secondly, an iron spearhead of Roman military style, which was found inside the ramparts after ground disturbance due to logging. Below the north ramparts of Welshbury is the enigmatic St Anthony's Well, an ancient spring whose name dates from the medieval period. However prehistoric flint implements have been found in the springs vicinity as well as Iron Age and Roman artefacts and it seems likely that the well was a ritual site for a long period of time. Saint Anthony's Well water is always extremely cold and for generations local people have bathed in it for the treatment of rheumatism and arthritis.

On 1 April 1935 the parish was abolished and merged with Blaisdon.

== Flaxley Abbey ==
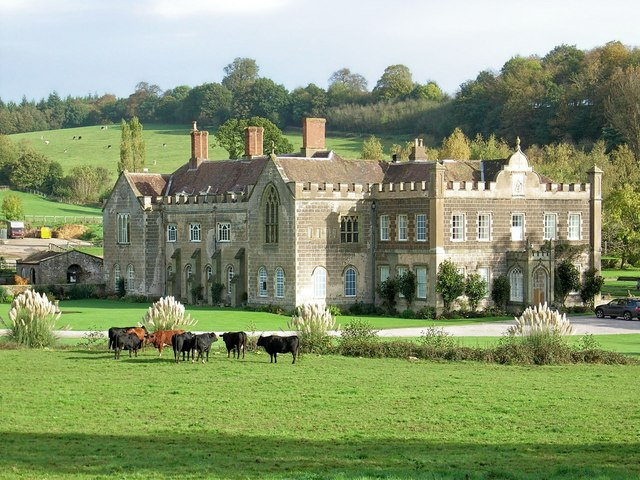
Flaxley Abbey.

The most significant feature of the village is Flaxley Abbey which dates back the 12th century and is now a private residence, although the summer village fetes are still held here. An 18th century resident of the abbey was Mary Pope, who gave her name to Pope's Hill, an inhabited hill to the south west of the village. Other buildings of note are the Church of St Mary the Virgin, and tiny Flaxley School which closed as a school in 1901 and more recently has been refurbished and is now used as a community village hall. Flaxley is in the parish of Westbury-on-Severn.
