= Lower Lydbrook Viaduct =

Coordinates: 51.8492°N 2.5883°W

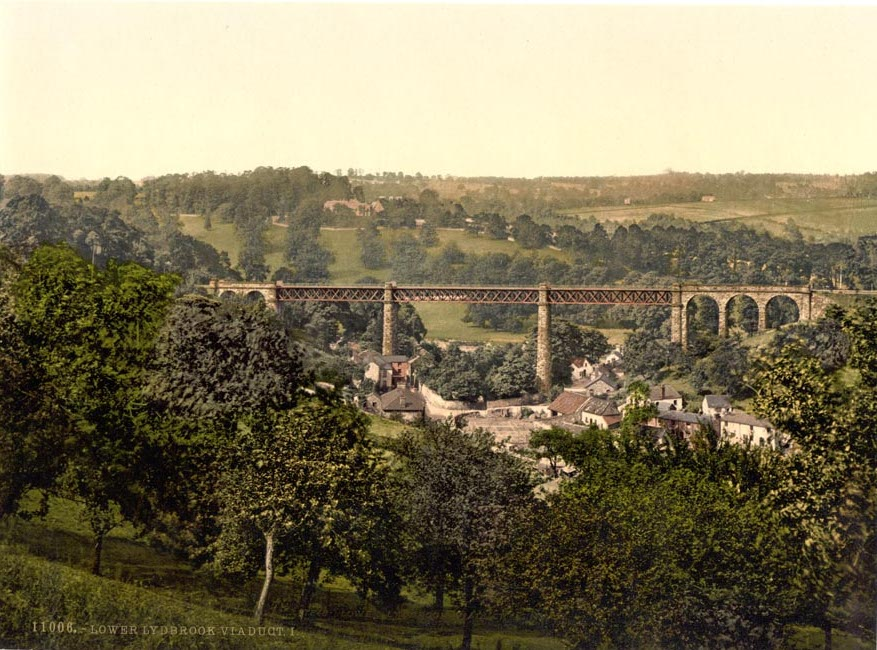

The Lower Lydbrook Viaduct was an iron railway viaduct with stone piers, it was on the Severn and Wye Railway and situated in Lower Lydbrook, Gloucestershire, England.

The viaduct, situated at the bottom of the Lydbrook Valley where it meets the Wye Valley, consisted of five stone arches and three wrought iron lattice truss girders. The viaduct rose some 80 feet above the roadway below, linking Forge Hill on the east with Randor on the west.

It enabled the rail lines from Cinderford via Bilston and Serridge to connect with the Ross-on-Wye to Monmouth line. It was built in 1872 and first used for traffic on 26 August 1874.

The Severn and Wye Railway was closed to passengers in 1929 and to goods in 1951. The viaduct was dismantled in 1966. A section of the railings from the viaduct has been installed in a residential garden in the nearby village of Brierley.
