= Christian Frederick Ramftler =

Teacher, minister, supporters of missionaries and serving the Moravian church

Christian Frederick Ramftler (1780–1832) was a German born teacher, minister, and supporter of missionaries, serving the Moravian Church, who worked for most of his career in England. He founded the Moravian Church in Brockweir, Gloucestershire.

== Birth, education and early career in Germany ==
Ramftler was born at the Moravian settlement at Barby in 1780, into an old Moravian family. At the age of seven he was sent to the Moravian school at Kleinwelka; he then entered the Pædagogium at Barby, and completed his education by studying theology at Niesky. After completing his studies, he served the Moravian Church as a schoolmaster for two years, first at Neusalz an der Oder, in Prussia (now Nowa Sól, Poland) and then at Uhyst. To his surprise, he then ‘received a call to England’. He consulted the Lot; the Lot gave consent; and he came to England in 1803.

== Life in England ==
After arriving in England, he served as a master in the Moravian’s boarding-school at Fairfield, Droylsden, in Lancashire.

In 1809 or 1810 he was called as minister to the Moravian settlement at Bedford. The church, the Bedford Congregation, was later called St Peter’s Moravian Church; it eventually became St Luke's United Church, which closed in 2008.

When Ramftler accepted the call to the ministry, he was informed that he would have to marry, and wife was found for him by the Church (following Moravian tradition, this would have involved consulting the Lot). She was Elizabeth Groves, and they married in 1810. The marriage is reported to have been a happy one. Their daughter, Elizabeth Groves Ramftler was born on 2 October 1815, and baptised on 8 October 1815.

In 1812, Ramftler moved to the Moravian settlement at Fulneck, in Pudsey, West Yorkshire, where he was stationed twelve years, until 1824. Whilst at Fulneck, Ramftler published The National Calamity improved. A sermon preached in reference to the interment of the Princess Charlotte Augusta of Wales.

Ramftler moved to Bristol in 1824. At Bristol, he was noted for his missionary zeal; he took an interest in the conversion of the Jews (through the London Society for Promoting Christianity amongst the Jews), often spoke at public meetings on behalf of the Church Missionary Society; and travelled on behalf of the London Association in Aid of Moravian Missions (Registered Charity No. 247127).

== Foundation of Brockweir Moravian Church ==
In March 1832, Ramftler visited Brockweir ‘at the invitation of some pious people of the vicinity’. At the time, Brockweir lacked a church but had many pubs; and it had a reputation for lawlessness. Ramftler received an encouraging response from the villagers, and the building of a church began, financed by voluntary contributions. Ramftler persuaded Louis West to be the church’s first minister; he was to serve as minister until 1870.

Ramftler laid the foundation stone on 15 October 1832, one of his last public services. He was in ill health and had been more or less of an invalid for some years; ten days later he died suddenly, on 25 October 1832.

The church opened on 2 May 1833, when 400 adults and 120 children attended the service of dedication.

== Responses to Ramftler’s death ==
In a letter informing him of Ramftler’s death, the poet and hymn writer James Montgomery was asked to write a suitable hymn (Montgomery had been received into the Moravian communion by Ramftler). The result was ‘Rest from thy labour, rest’ (On the death of a Minister).

Rev. Thomas Grinfield published Select Remains of Rev C. F. Ramftler in 1833. This was advertised as containing ‘several valuable Sermons, which Mr. Ramftler had occasionally composed, and a Series of interesting Extracts from his Journals and Correspondence’. The Remains were favourably reviewed in The West of England Journal of Science and Literature; the reviewer remarking ‘Mr Grinfield has acted the part of a faithful and judicious biographer, in laying before his readers the infirmities as well as the excellencies of this most elevated character, and it is to be wished that this example were more generally followed on such occasions’.

== Character ==
Ramftler’s character was described as '… rough and abrupt; at heart he was gentle as a woman. He was a strict disciplinarian, a keen questioner, and an unflinching demander of a Christian walk. Not one jot or tittle would he allow his people to yield to the loose ways of the world. In his sermons he dealt hard blows at cant; and in his private conversation he generally managed to put his finger upon the sore spot. … In all his habits Ramftler was strictly methodical. He always rose before six; he always finished his writing by eleven; and he kept a list of the texts from which he preached'.

Ramftler’s portrait was engraved by Woodman, ‘after a drawing by Brett of Bristol’ in 1832.
