= Taynton, Gloucestershire =

Coordinates: 51.894°N 2.398°W

Taynton
- Village
- Location within Gloucestershire
- Population: 438 (2011 Census)
- OS grid reference: SO727217
  - London: 100 mi (160 km) ESE
- Civil parish: Taynton
- District: Forest of Dean
- Shire county: Gloucestershire
- Region: South West
- Country: England
- Sovereign state: United Kingdom
- Post town: Gloucester
- Postcode district: GL19
- Dialling code: 01452
- Police: Gloucestershire
- Fire: Gloucestershire
- Ambulance: South Western
- UK Parliament: Forest of Dean

Taynton is a village and civil parish in the Forest of Dean district of Gloucestershire, England. It lies about 2.5 miles (4.0 km) south-east of Newent, about 2 miles (3.2 km) north-east of Mitcheldean and 7 miles (11 km) west of Gloucester. The parish covers 1,029 hectares (3.97 sq mi) At the time of the 2011 Census, the population of the parish was 438.

== History ==
Taynton is listed in the 1086 Domesday Book as being a manor of 6 hides, previously held by the Saxon lord Alwin and since the Norman Conquest by William Goizenboded. The manor then passed to the Du Boys family and then, by marriage, to the Ferrers family (later Viscount Hereford). In 1601, the Crown reclaimed the manor, following the execution of Sir Christopher Blount. The manor was later sold to a succession of owners, including Sir Robert Parkhurst (d.1636) and Thomas Pury MP (d.1693).

The first village school was founded in 1712, and a dedicated school building was erected in 1883.

In 1870–72, John Marius Wilson recorded the population as 689;

== Parish ==
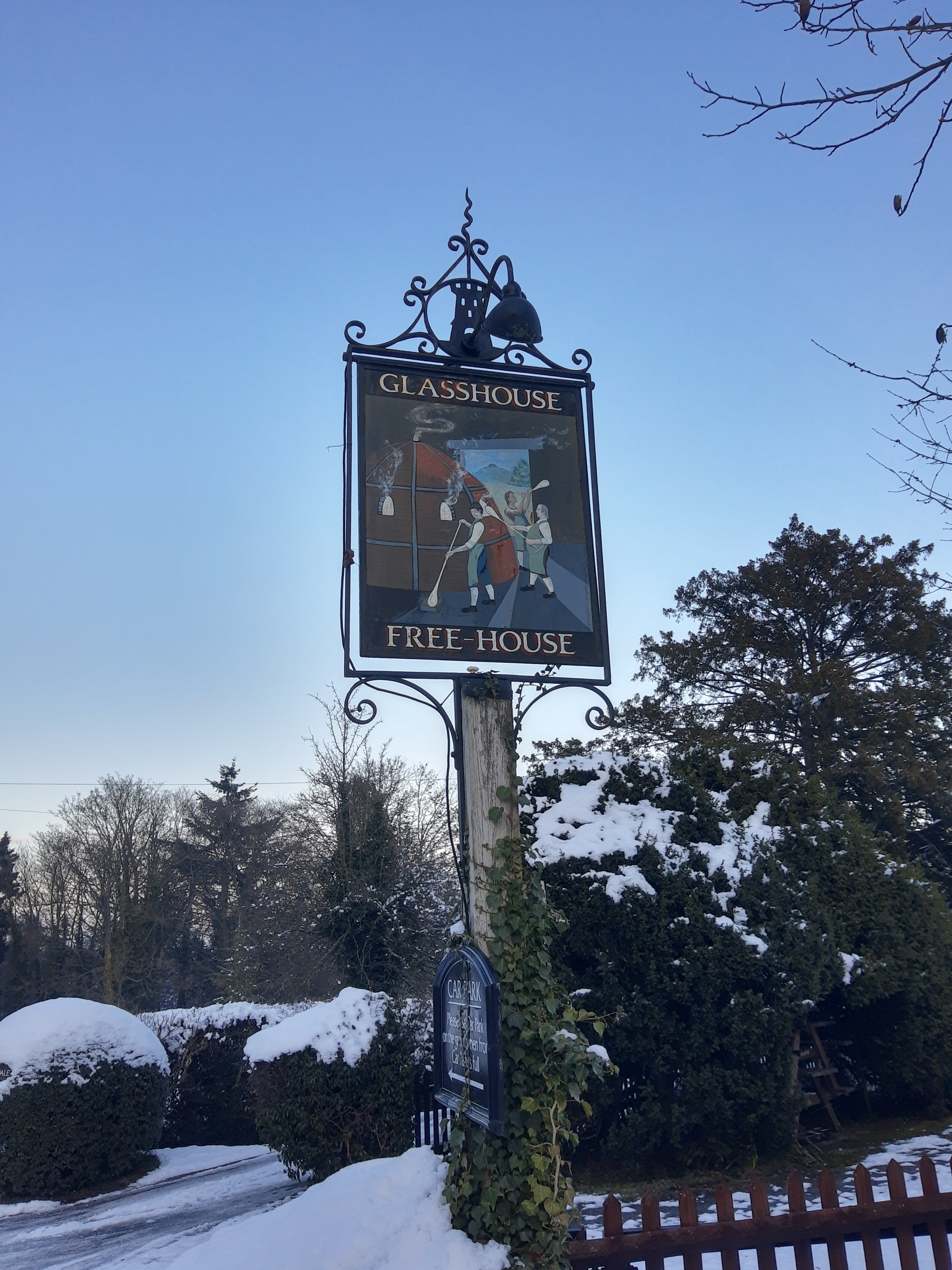
The Glasshouse Inn pub

The present-day parish of Taynton was formed of the manors of Great and Little Taynton. As well as Taynton itself, there are several hamlets and scattered farmsteads in the parish. They include Glasshouse, Hownhall, Kent's Green, Little Taynton and Moorend Green. Glasshouse is on the site of a 16th-century glassworks.

The parish has a public house, The Glasshouse Inn.

== Parish church ==
The original Church of England parish church was recorded in the mid-12th century; along with the nearby rectory it was destroyed during the Civil War by Royalist forces after the siege of Gloucester in 1643. The site is visible as earthen mounds and a moat at Little Taynton, about 1.5 miles (2.4 km) north-east of the centre of Taynton village.

Today's parish church of Saint Lawrence is located about 1,100 yards (1.0 km) north-east of the village centre. It is Grade II listed as a rare example of a church built during the Commonwealth. Originally constructed as a single room preaching-box by order of Parliament in 1650, several 19th-century alterations and expansions converted it into a conventionally formed church.

== Other historical buildings ==
There are 31 Grade II listed buildings in the parish. As well as the church and several monuments within it, there are numerous farm buildings, barns and cottages that range between 200 and 400 years old. They include Taynton Court at Kent's Green, and Taynton House in Taynton; both are enlarged buildings with parts that date back to 17th-century farmhouses.

== See also ==
- Grade II* listed buildings in Forest of Dean
