= Brockweir =

Village in Gloucestershire, England

Coordinates: 51.7071°N 2.6676°W

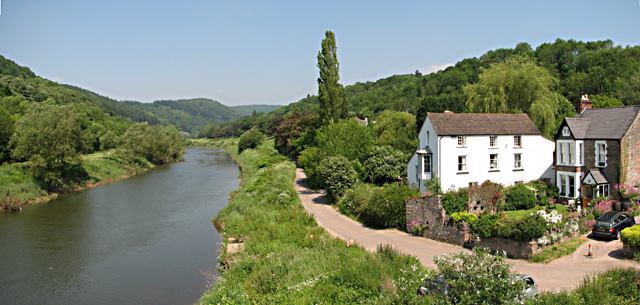
- The River Wye and old quayside at Brockweir

- Location within Gloucestershire
- OS grid reference: SO539011
- Civil parish: Hewelsfield and Brockweir
- District: Forest of Dean
- Shire county: Gloucestershire
- Region: South West
- Country: England
- Sovereign state: United Kingdom
- Post town: Chepstow
- Postcode district: NP16
- Police: Gloucestershire
- Fire: Gloucestershire
- Ambulance: South Western
- UK Parliament: Forest of Dean

Brockweir is a village in Hewelsfield and Brockweir civil parish, in the Forest of Dean District of Gloucestershire, England. The civil parish also includes the separate village of Hewelsfield.

The village is located on the eastern bank of the River Wye. A road bridge links it across the river to Monmouthshire, Wales, about a mile (1.6 km) outside the village of Tintern and 7 1/2 miles (12.1 km) north of Chepstow. The village is close to both the Offa's Dyke Path and the Wye Valley Walk.

== History ==
Brockweir is first attested in an annotation on the now lost place-name Pull Brochuail (Welsh pwll ‘pool, lake, pit’ + Welsh personal name Brochfael) in the Book of Llandaff, in a charter dated to c. 620. All later spellings of Brockweir, however, suggest the present place-name is derived from Old English brōc ‘brook’ + wer. Brockweir is located where a small brook meets the Wye; however, there remains the possibility that the first element might be a shortened form of the personal name Brochfael.

Brockweir has been an important crossing point of the River Wye throughout history, and is approached by a reputedly ancient cross-peninsular trackway. The weir from which the village gets its name is first documented as a gift to Monmouth Priory from Baderon, Lord of Tintern in c 1120; it was held by Tintern Abbey in 1331. The remains of the weir can be seen as shallows under Brockweir bridge. This was obviously a lucrative weir which, coupled with the river crossing, would have made Brockweir an important location; settlement probably sprang up there at an early date.

The village existed from at least the 13th century, as a hamlet within the parish of Hewelsfield. The oldest existing building, the Malthouse, dates in part from the 15th century and probably formed part of a grange owned by Tintern Abbey. Another house, the Manor House, dates from about 1600, and many other houses date from the 18th century.

For centuries many inhabitants of Brockweir were employed in the trade of the river Wye. Among them was John Gethin, who left two boats to his sons in 1571 (one of his sons was probably the John Gethin who was killed on his boat in the Bristol Channel, during an affray with Bristol merchants in 1587). Brockweir was the highest point reached by a normal tide on the Wye, and a key transhipment point where the cargoes of sea-going ships of up to 90 tonnes were transferred onto barges to be sent upstream, and the products of Herefordshire, Monmouthshire and the Forest of Dean (principally iron and timber) were sent back to Bristol and beyond.

Brockweir, approached as much by water as by road, was an isolated community with an independent character. The minister appointed to its new Moravian church in 1832 (see below) described the life of its watermen as being centred on beerhouses, skittle alleys, and cockfighting and said that it had the reputation of a 'city of refuge' for lawless elements. Only one narrow road led into the village, and goods were usually carried by donkeys or by water, with a ferry taking travellers to and from the Welsh bank of the Wye.

Several chapels, a school, the decline of its trade, and an influx of outsiders to the area gradually changed the character of the village. During the early 20th century several Nonconformist groups, including Quakers, Pentecostals, and Christian Scientists, held meetings in Brockweir and the surrounding area. The Grade II listed lattice girder road bridge, linking Brockweir to the main Chepstow to Monmouth road (now the A466), was built in Chepstow by Edward Finch & Co., and was opened in 1906. La Belle Marie, a wood twin-screw steam boat of 31 tons, was bought by James Dibden of Brockweir in about 1905 and ran on the Wye as a market boat until the First World War. She was then laid up and dismantled; a few remains of the boat were still visible near Brockweir bridge as late as 1934. In 1929 Brockweir Halt was opened on the Wye Valley Railway on the Monmouthshire side of the bridge. The halt closed in 1959.

=== Shipbuilding ===
Trows and barges have been built in Brockweir from at least the eighteenth century. From the mid-1820s, seagoing vessels, including brigs, schooners and barques began to be built in Brockweir, using local timber. The ships were not fitted out in Brockweir – the hulls were floated down to Chepstow or Bristol for fitting out. There were two yards in Brockweir: one owned by John Easton of Hereford; and one owned by Hezekiah Swift of Monmouth, a timber merchant. Swift’s business was continued by his son Thomas. The building of seagoing vessels had ceased by 1850, but the building of small craft continued at Brockweir until the end of the century. The largest recorded Brockweir-built vessel was the barque Constantine, built in 1847, measuring 506 tons and 121 ft. long. Manoeuvring such large hulls down the Wye must have been a difficult business, only possible in times of spate.

=== Notable residents ===
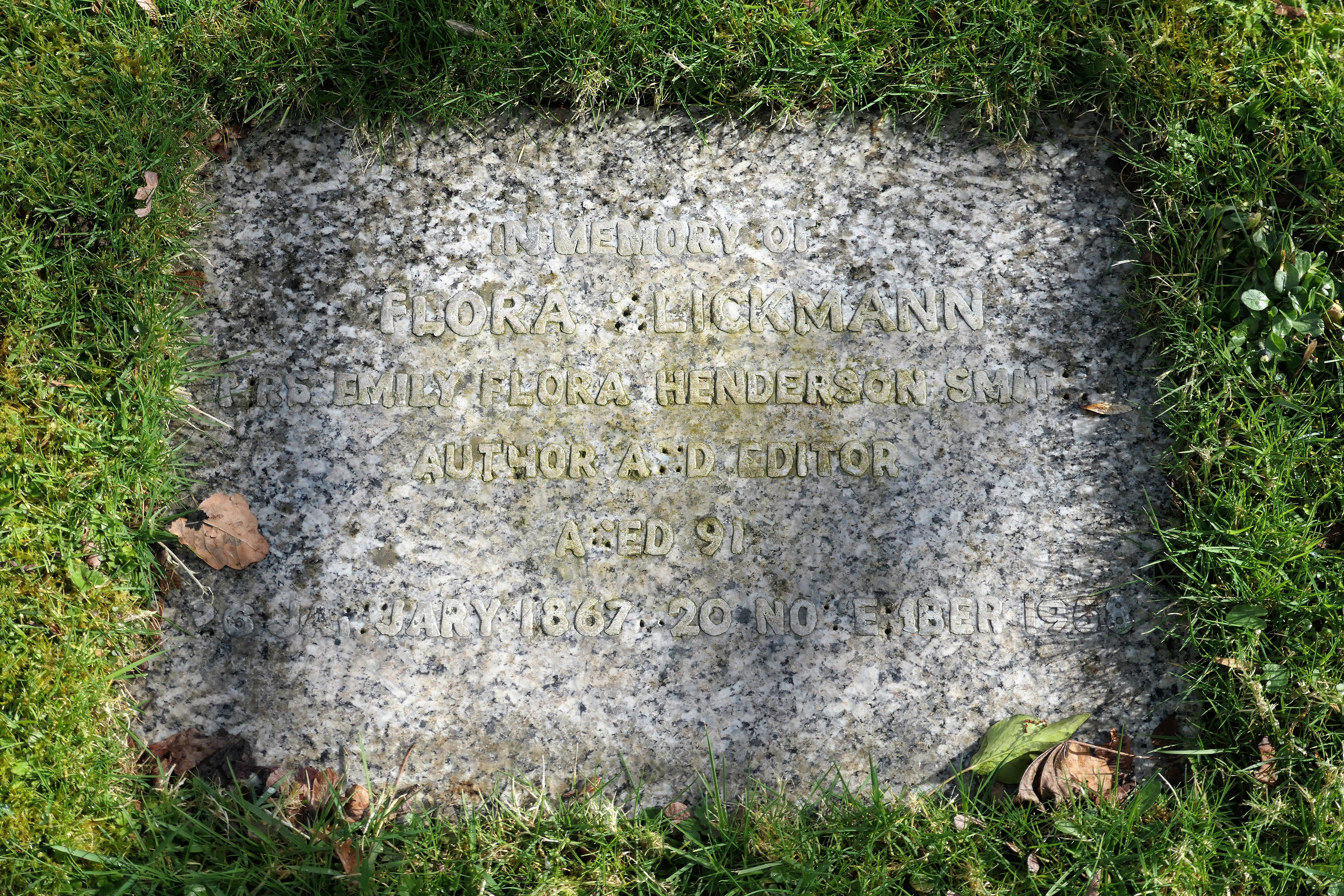
Monument to Flora Klickmann (1867–1958), author and editor.

The writer Flora Klickmann (1867–1958), who wrote several popular books about her experiences of living in the Wye valley near Brockweir, is buried in the churchyard of the Moravian Church.

== Moravian Church ==
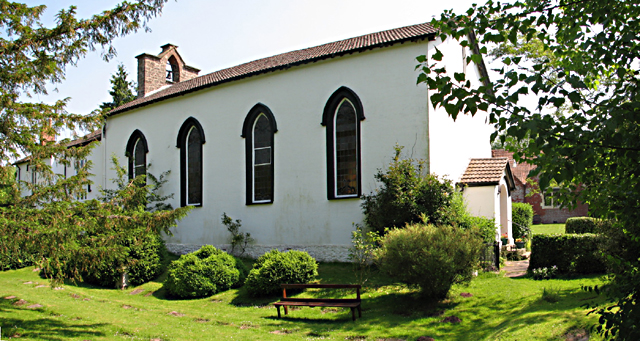
Brockweir Moravian Church

In 1831 a Tintern doctor, worried about the spiritual state of the villagers as well as their physical health, wrote about the situation to the Moravian Minister in Bristol, Rev. C F Ramftler. In 1832 Rev. Ramftler held services in Brockweir and received an encouraging response; following which the building of the Moravian Church began, on ground given for the purpose by the Duke of Beaufort, financed by voluntary contributions. Before the church was built, the site, then in the parish of Woolaston, is reported to have been used by the villagers for their ‘rustic sports’—cockfighting, gambling, dancing and quarrelling.

The first minister was Lewis West, who drew congregations of up to 200 people.

The interior was modified in 1902, and now contains good Art Nouveau windows and joinery, including a gallery at the entrance end of the church.

== Brockweir’s Pubs ==
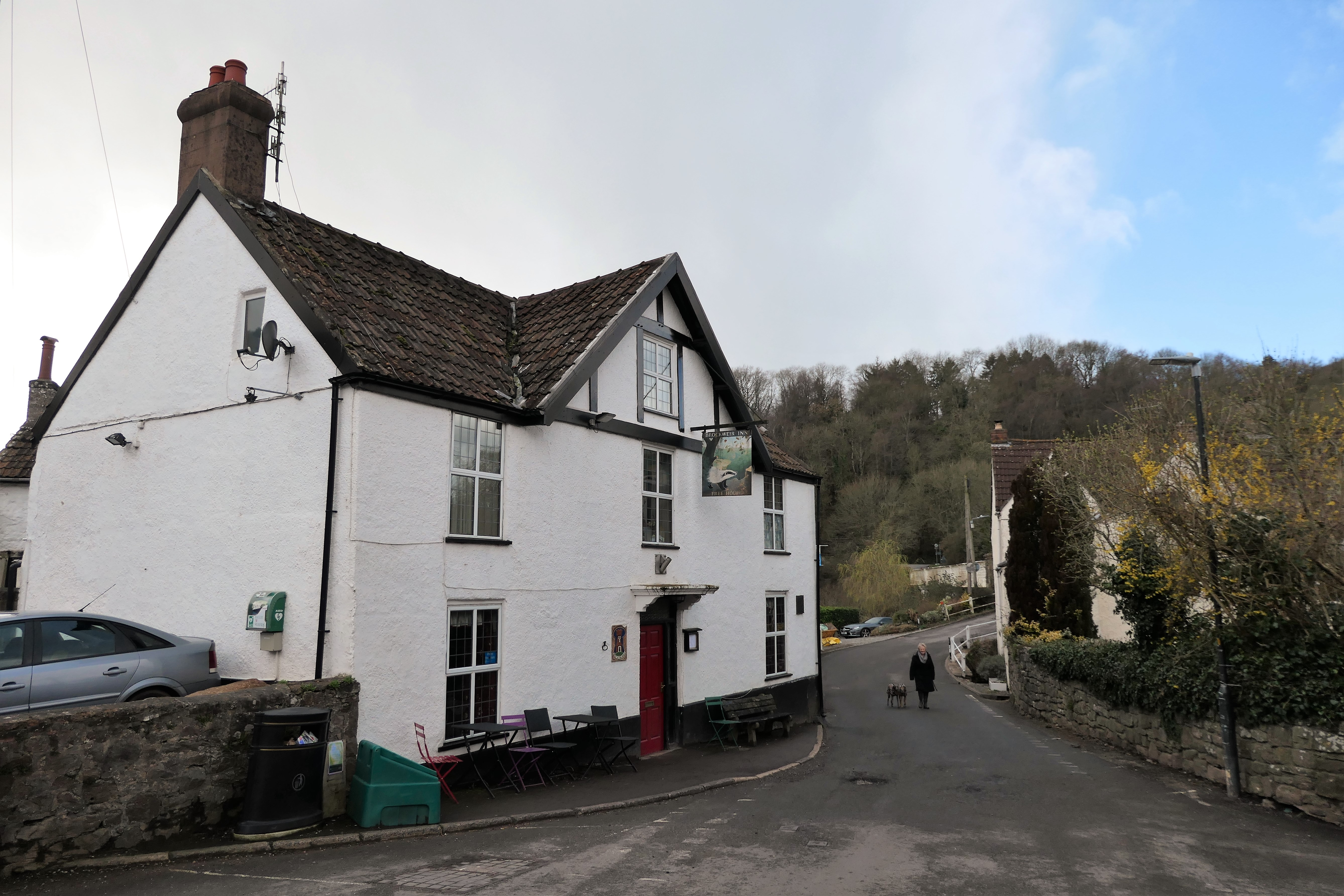
The Brockweir Inn.

An inn called the George, on the south side of the road to the river bank, was recorded from 1793 and had changed its name to the New Inn by 1840. In 1840 the village had three other public houses, called, in connection with its trade, the Ship, the Severn Trow, and the Bristol. There was then also a beerhouse called the Spout north of the village in a row of cottages that was later formed into a single dwelling called Spout House. The Bristol was called the Sloop in 1844. By 1891 the New Inn and another called the Royal Arms were the only public houses in the village; the latter closed after 1959, leaving only the New Inn, which by 1994 had changed its name to the Brockweir inn. The Brockweir Inn is currently (November 2019) closed for renovation.

== Village Community Shop ==
The Brockweir and Hewelsfield Village Shop and Cafe was set up after the previous village shop closed in 2000. It is a non-profit making community enterprise, staffed by volunteers from the local community, owned and managed by the Brockweir and Hewelsfield Village Shop Association Limited. The Association was first registered on 25 September 2001 under the Industrial and Provident Societies Acts 1965-1978. It is currently registered under the Co-operative and Community Benefit Societies Act 2014 as a ‘Registered Society’, Registration Number 29285R. The site includes a café, general store and food outlet, library kiosk, art gallery and IT training suite. It also provides basic postal facilities.

The Village Shop and Cafe was opened by the Prince of Wales in December 2004, when he described the project as "a triumph of community spirit".

The building is traditionally built from local green oak, but it is combined with sustainable technology, and aims to be environmentally friendly. Photovoltaic roof shingles produce electricity, and any excess can be exported back to the national grid. The building also has a geothermal heating system, drawing energy from the ground under the village playing field.

The project cost around £375,000 and support came from many different sources, including the Department for Environment, Food and Rural Affairs and the Countryside Agency. About £20,000 was raised by the sale of bonds, and local fundraising, donations, and volunteer labour added another £10,000. Charity Bank provided a £100,000 bridging loan to get the project going in 2003.

== Listed buildings in Brockweir ==
Listed buildings in the village of Brockweir are listed in the table below, with links to the relevant Historic England list entry. Listed buildings in the village Hewelsfield are given in the Wikipedia article on Hewelsfield. For the purposes of the table, 'Brockweir' is taken to include all buildings in the Civil Parish of Hewelsfield and Brockweir to the west of Offa's Dyke; 'Hewelsfield' is taken to include all buildings in the Civil Parish of Hewelsfield and Brockweir to the east of Offa's Dyke.

Listed Buildings in Brockweir
Building name	List Entry Number	Grade
Moravian Chapel	1299144	II
Woolaston House	1122679	II
Glen Wye	1122690	II
Malt House	1186590	II*
Post Office	1186591	II
Spring Cottage	1186593	II
Manor House and Adjoining House	1299145	II
Abbey House	1338192	II
Barn at Honeyfield Farm Approximately 75 metres South of Farmhouse and Across Road	1186592	II
Brockweir Bridge	1393683	II
Old Tramway Bridge (Formerly Wireworks Bridge)	1393682	II

Brockweir is also home to a notable contemporary building, the eco-home The Outhouse off Hillgay Road to the north of the village. It was designed by architects Loyn & Co and was the winner of several architectural awards, as well as being shortlisted for the 2016 RIBA House of the Year and shortlisted for the RIBA Stirling prize.
