= Welshbury Hill =

Coordinates: 51.837°N 2.470°W

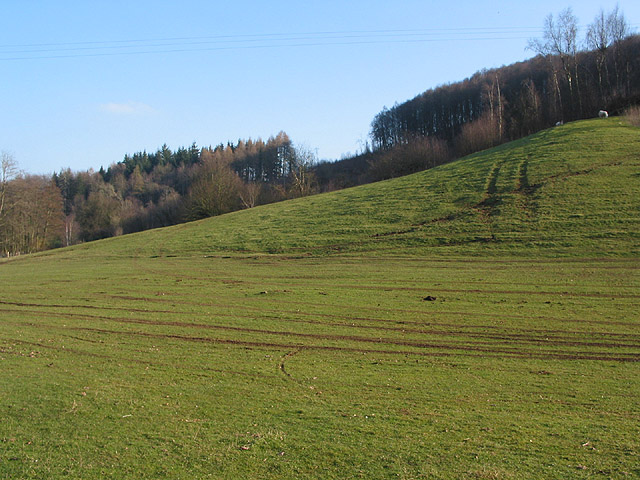
Slopes of Welshbury Hill

Welshbury Hill is an Iron Age hill fort near Mitcheldean in Gloucestershire, England. It is thought to have been built by Celts and dates back to 1600 BC.

Welshbury Hill Fort is reputed to be the place where the Celtic Dobunni tribe staged its last battle against the Romans after a long-running guerrilla war.

There is an ancient spring water well nearby known locally as St Anthony's Well.
