= Sarah Siddons' House =

Sarah Siddons' House (the Old House)
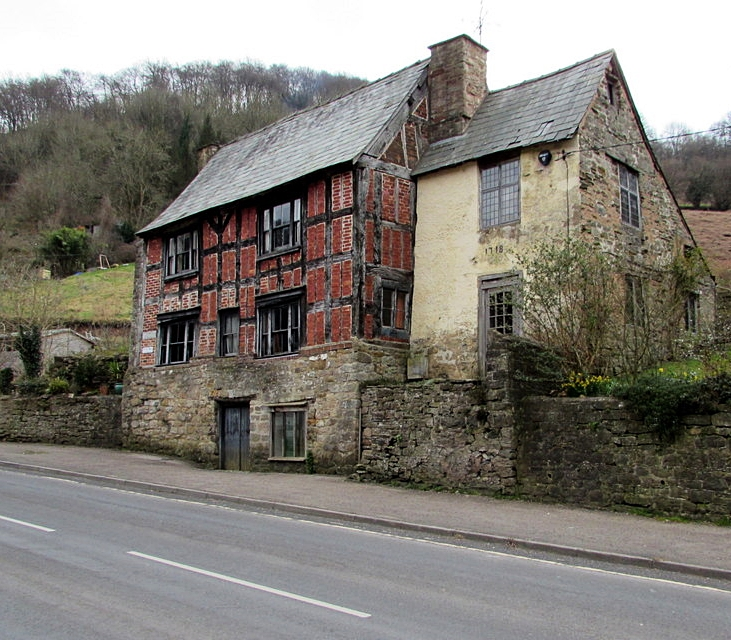

- Location within Gloucestershire
- 51.8422°N 2.5847°W
- Type: House
- Location: Lydbrook, Gloucestershire

History
- Built: 16th century, with extension of 1718

Site notes
- Architectural style: Vernacular
- Governing body: Privately owned

Listed Building – Grade II*
- Official name: Sarah Siddons' House (the Old House)
- Designated: 12 December 1953
- Reference no.: 1299249

Sarah Siddons' House, also called the Old House, is a cottage in the village of Lydbrook, Gloucestershire, England. A Grade II* listed building, the cottage was reputedly the childhood home of the actor Sarah Siddons.

== History and description ==
The village of Lydbrook stands in the Wye Valley, on the edge of the Forest of Dean. In the mid-18th century, the village was reputedly the home of Roger Kemble, an actor-manager and patriarch of the Kemble family. His most famous child, Sarah was born at Brecon in 1755, while her father's company, the Warwickshire Company of Comedians was on tour in Wales. In the 19th century, the tradition developed that Sarah was bought up in the cottage at Lydbrook, where Roger Kemble was known to have owned property. Siddons went on to become "the country's finest tragic actress", dying in London in 1831. (Note: Siddons is not commemorated at the cottage, although a campaign for a memorial plaque is ongoing. Her London home at 27 Upper Baker Street did bear a Blue plaque, the first awarded to memorialise a woman. The house was demolished in 1905, and the plaque is now in storage at the Victoria and Albert Museum.)

The cottage dates from the 16th century. Alan Brooks, in the revised 2002 Gloucestershire volume of Pevsner's Buildings of England series, describes it as a "good timber-framed house". There is an extension to the side dated 1718. The timber frame is infilled with brick nogging to the front. The cottage is a Grade II* listed building.

== Sources ==
- Phelps, Humphrey (2008). The Forest of Dean. Stroud, Gloucestershire: Amberley Publishing. ISBN 978-1-445-62579-9.
- Verey, David; Brooks, Alan (2002) [1970]. Gloucestershire 2: The Vale and the Forest of Dean. The Buildings of England. New Haven, US and London: Yale University Press. ISBN 978-0-300-09733-7. OCLC 249275468.
