= Hewelsfield Motte =

Scheduled monument in Gloucestershire, England

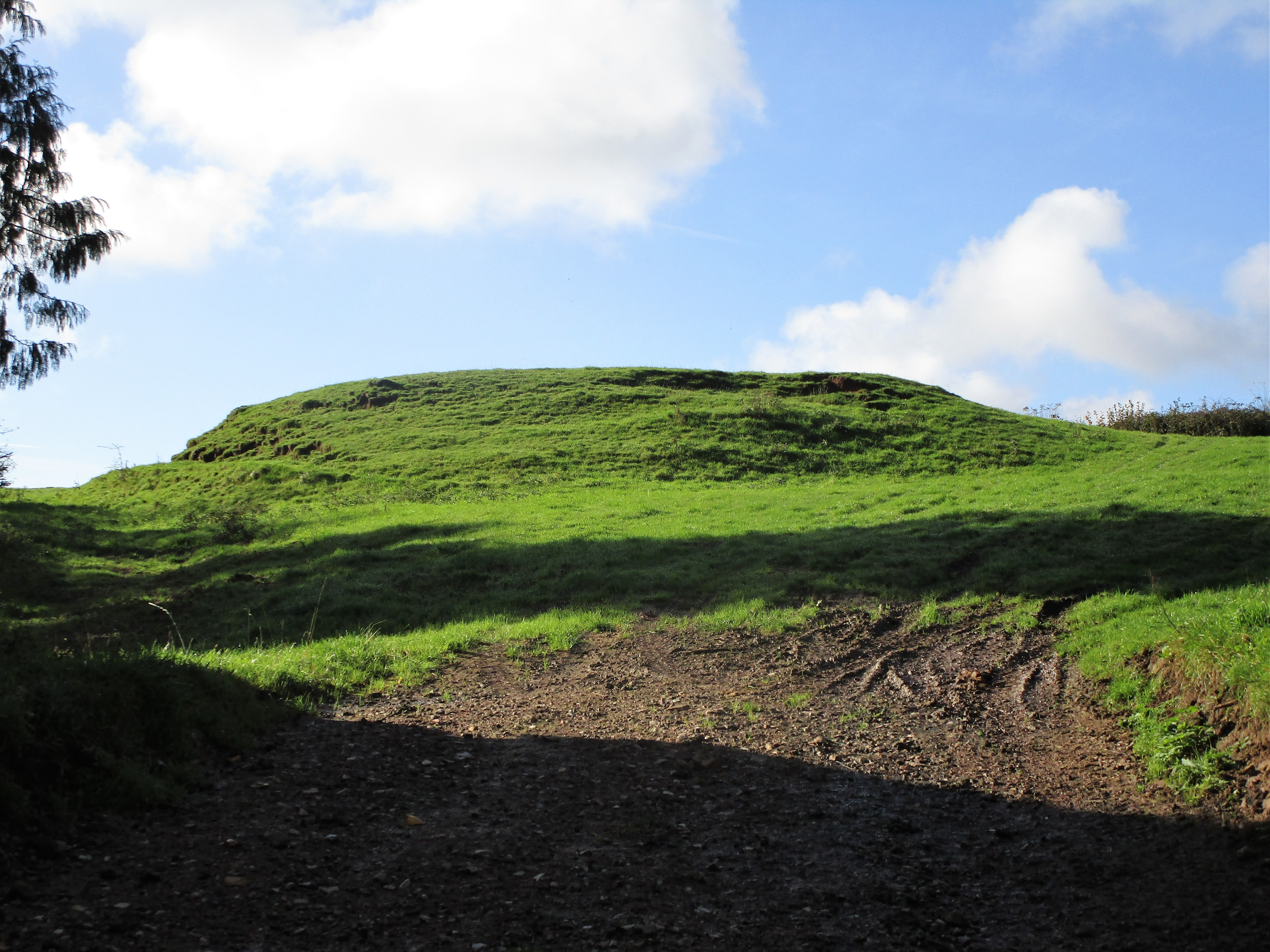
- View of Hewelsfield Castle Motte from the north-east
- Type: Motte castle
- Location: Hewelsfield, Gloucestershire, UK.
- Coordinates: 51.7159°N 2.6284°W
- OS grid reference: SO 56683 02091
- Built: Late 12th century?

Scheduled monument
- Official name: Motte Castle 57m south-west of Church of St Mary Magdalene
- Designated: 3 April 2012
- Reference no.: 1407096

The Hewelsfield Motte is a roughly circular mound, in Hewelsfield, Gloucestershire, England. It is thought to be a castle motte dating from the period 1175-1200. The site is also known as Hewelsfield Castle Tump. The motte is a scheduled monument, first listed on 3 April 2012, List Entry Number 1407096.

== History ==
Historic England states ‘Documentary sources indicate that the settlement at Hewelsfield was forcibly depopulated to expand the hunting forest (Royal Forest of Dean) after 1066, but was reconstituted into a manor in the C12. The Norman Church can be dated stylistically to the period 1175-1200. There is no evidence to indicate when the motte castle at the centre of the village was constructed, but it is likely to date from around this time, either as part of the consolidation of the countryside or as a matter of local defence’.

== Details ==
Hewelsfield Motte is located about 80 metres (87 yd) southwest of St. Mary Magdalene's church at Hewelsfield, in the Forest of Dean, Gloucestershire, England. There is no evidence of any masonry structure. There are the remains of a ditch around its base, and other banks and ditches nearby may indicate the existence of a bailey.

The mound and related features have been mapped by English Heritage’s Forest of Dean Mapping Project, part of its National Mapping Programme.

The presence of the motte is not indicated on 1:50 000 or 1:25 000 Ordnance Survey maps.

A good view of the motte can be obtained from a field gate on the corner of Church Road, opposite the church lychgate.
