= Gun's Mills, Flaxley =

Gun's Mills
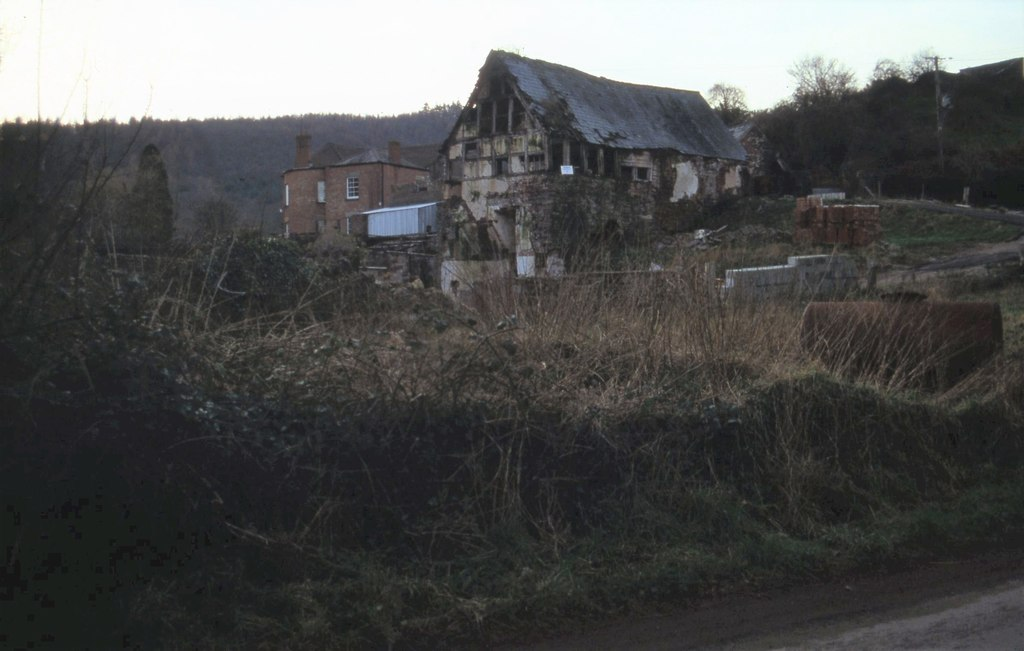
- The main mill in a ruinous state c.1988

- Location within Gloucestershire
- 51.8413°N 2.473°W
- Type: Mill
- Location: Flaxley, Gloucestershire

Site notes
- Architectural style: Industrial
- Governing body: Forest of Dean Buildings Preservation Trust

Scheduled monument
- Official name: Gunns Mills furnace
- Reference no.: 1002080

Listed Building – Grade II*
- Official name: Mill at Gun's Mills
- Designated: 23 September 1955
- Reference no.: 1186479

Listed Building – Grade II
- Official name: Gun's Mills House
- Designated: 23 September 1955
- Reference no.: 1186868

Gun's Mills, at Flaxley, in the Forest of Dean, Gloucestershire, England, was a major industrial site from the 17th century. Originally built as an armaments factory with associated blast furnace in 1629, it was converted into a paper mill in the 18th century and operated as such until the late 19th century. By the 21st century the mill buildings were largely ruinous, but are being restored as of 2023. Structures on the site included listed buildings and a scheduled monument. The mill complex has been described as the "best remaining furnace of the earliest phase of British blast-furnace practice' and as the "oldest surviving blast furnace that exists in Europe, if not in the world."

== History ==
Gun's Mills (alternatively Gunn's Mills) began as a site for corn and fulling mills, fuelled by the water power from a tributary of the neighbouring Westbury Brook. The complex is named after William Gunn, a wool fuller, who rented the site in the late 16th century. In the early 17th century, Sir John Winter (a.k.a. Wintour/Wynter), a local ironmaster established an armaments foundry at the site. Winter, a staunch Royalist and private secretary to Henrietta Maria, wife of Charles I, became a major supplier of weaponry to the king's forces. (Note: Sir John Winter, reputedly a poor commander, became notable for his feats of escapology, in particular his fleeing a party of pursuing Roundheads by riding his horse off a cliff at Lancaut in the Wye Valley, a spot now known as Wintour's Leap.)

By 1683 a blast furnace was operating at the site. The Society for the Protection of Ancient Buildings (SPAB) suggests this structure was a re-build of the original furnace. By 1743 the building had been converted to a paper mill. (Note: Catherine Drew (1784-1867), known as 'The Forest Poetess', was born in the area. Her father worked at the mill as a paper maker, and she was employed as a housekeeper by a Mr Lloyd, the mill's owner. Her only published work, A Collection of Poems on the Forest of Dean, was issued in a run of 100 copies in 1841, an early date for a female poet.) This operated until the end of the 19th century, when the site was converted to agricultural use and the mill was repurposed as a cowshed.

In the 21st century, the mill site was acquired by the Forest of Dean Buildings Preservation Trust, which is undertaking restoration. The main mill was covered in scaffolding and tarpaulin for over 20 years, for preservation while restoration funding was sought, but a grant from Historic England in 2023 has enabled some progress.

Gunn Mill House now operates as an Asha centre.

== Architecture and description ==
The Forest of Dean was a site for iron working from Roman times and by the 16th century had become an important industrial district, a “cradle of industry before the Industrial Revolution”. Gun's Mills has been described as the "best remaining furnace of the earliest phase of British blast-furnace practice", and as the "oldest surviving blast furnace, complete with its original lining and 'charging house' on top, that exists in Europe, if not in the world." The main mill is a Grade II* listed building. The furnace is a scheduled monument, and a house on the site is listed at Grade II.

== Sources ==
- Hart, C. (1971). The Industrial History of Dean. Newton Abbot: David & Charles. ISBN 9780715352885.
- Wedgwood, Cicely Veronica (1958). The King's War 1641 - 1647. London: Collins. OCLC 895286004.
