= Lydbrook =

Village in Gloucestershire, England

Coordinates: 51.84°N 2.58°W

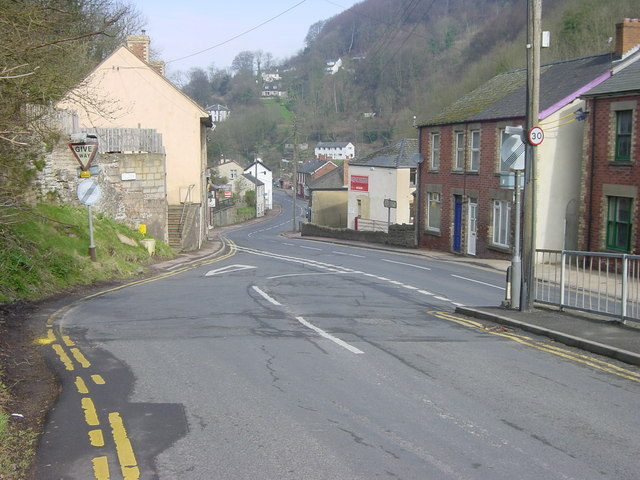

- Location within Gloucestershire
- Population: 2,192 (2011)
- OS grid reference: SO602156
- District: Forest of Dean
- Shire county: Gloucestershire
- Region: South West
- Country: England
- Sovereign state: United Kingdom
- Post town: LYDBROOK
- Postcode district: GL17
- Dialling code: 01594
- Police: Gloucestershire
- Fire: Gloucestershire
- Ambulance: South Western
- UK Parliament: Forest of Dean

Lydbrook is a civil parish located in the Wye Valley, within the Forest of Dean district of Gloucestershire, England. It is on the north west edge of the Forest of Dean's present legal boundary proper. It comprises the hamlets and villages of Lower Lydbrook, Upper Lydbrook, Joys Green and Worrall Hill.

== Early history ==
The area now forming the present village of Lydbrook has been inhabited throughout history. Artifacts from Hangerberry and Eastbach on the south west corner of the parish, and Lower Lydbrook show evidence of widespread activity from the Mesolithic period (Middle Stone Age 10,000–4000 BC) to the present. Flint stone tools from surrounding fields confirm that the area was occupied and farmed for more than 4,000 years.

Lydbrook was inhabited by the Romans as there is evidence of a Roman homestead along Proberts Barn Lane, Lower Lydbrook. The timber building detected on the site may date from the 1st century AD. A later building with stone walls was still inhabited in the 4th century. The site was a farming and agricultural centre in the Roman period. There is also evidence of Roman activity at Hangerberry with traces of a Roman pavement. A Roman road came from Ruardean through Lower Lydbrook (tracing the Wye) to English Bicknor. A further ancient road existed between Joys Green and English Bicknor via Bell Hill. Traces of a Roman Road also exist from Worrall Hill to Edge End. These Roman track ways show evidence of following previous prehistoric paths. In 1881 it was reported a large quantity of Roman coins were found at Lower Lydbrook. The Dean Archaeological Group's recent excavations in and around Lydbrook have recovered other coins from the Roman period, as well as other artefacts pre-dating and post dating this period.

== Parish boundaries ==
For those living today there may be differences as to what comprises Lydbrook. There is the village of Lydbrook which for many would include Worrall Hill, Hangerberry and Stowfield. There is also the Parish of Lydbrook which includes Joys Green, Hawsley and High Beech. The complexities of boundaries for Lydbrook have been greater in the past.

Before becoming part of Gloucestershire, prior to the 12th century, the Forest of Dean lay in Herefordshire. For example, Ruardean was an extension of the parish of Walford in Herefordshire and St John's church at Ruardean was a daughter church of Walford Church.

In the same time as the Forest of Dean came into Gloucestershire the Forest had become the preserve of the Crown. The area now covered by Upper Lydbrook and Joys Green, would have been served in times past by the church at Mitcheldean. However, from Norman times until the mid 19th century, it came under the Forest's Bailiff for Mitcheldean (in other words 'the Magna or Great Dean Bailiwick'), and thus was extra-parochial, or outside of a parish.

Lower Lydbrook was divided between the parishes of English Bicknor and Walford (served by the Church of St John the Baptist at Ruardean), with the Lyd forming the boundary. The mid-19th century saw the parochialisation of the Forest. Each area within the legal boundaries of the Forest came under both a church district and a civic district. In 1816 Upper Lydbrook and Joys Green came under the newly created church of Holy Trinity at Harrow Hill, with a mission chapel built in Upper Lydbrook in 1821. By 1842 this arrangement was formalised by the newly created ecclesiastical district of Holy Trinity (Harrow Hill, Drybrook).

The civic boundaries of the Forest differed from the church boundaries and from 1842 Lower Lydbrook and Upper Lydbrook became part of the Township of West Dean, with Joys Green coming within the westmost boundary of the Township of East Dean, the Railway line (constructed later in the 1860s) ran along this boundary. In 1852 Lower Lydbrook, Upper Lydbrook and Joys Green all became part of the newly created ecclesiastical parish of Lydbrook. It was much later in 1935 that the civic parish of Lydbrook was created.

Lower Lydbrook and Upper Lydbrook had developed as separate communities prior to the 17th century and remained so legally until the 19th century. A few of the older inhabitants of the village reported that a toll gate once existed between Lower and Upper Lydbrook.

Lower Lydbrook was settled as part of the parishes of English Bicknor and Ruardean, and was the focus of the iron industry. You only have to look at the location of housing in Lower Lydbrook to see a defined community adjacent to the Wye River and Lyd brook. The pond also served as a focal point, as well a community meeting places. Lower Lydbrook people were buried in the churchyards of Ruardean and English Bicknor (as well as a number being buried at Welsh Bicknor across the Wye). Upper Lydbrook lay within the Forest boundary which had been part of the Bailiwick of Mitcheldean, and had been encroached (housing being built within what was once strictly a Crown preserve), serving as a focus for the mining community.

== Governance ==
Lydbrook falls in 'Lydbrook and Ruardean' electoral ward. This ward starts in the south east at Lydbrook and stretches to the north east at Ruardean. The total parish population taken at the 2011 census was 4,819.

== Present community ==
The present community of Lydbrook seems to have had its beginnings in the 13th century. In a record of a sale of trees in 1256, mention is made of 'the Mill of Lydbrook'. Further early notes on Lydbrook occur in a survey of the Forest of Dean in 1282. The Lyd (a brook, which flows into the River Wye, and not the one that flows to Lydney) formed, for part of its travels, the boundary between the Bailiwicks of Bikenore (English Bicknor) and Rywardin (Ruardean). Today many maps call the Lyd, Hough Brook, or Great Hough Brook, and How Brook which joins the Lyd is known on modern maps as Little Hough Brook. Listed in the 1282 entries of those who possessed cultivated land, William of Ludebrok (Lydbrook), appears under the parish of Bikenore, and under the parish of Rywardin. Rather than being two separate pieces of land in differing localities, it was probably that William's land will have included the brook, hence his inclusion in the records for both parishes. In addition, under the entry for Bikenore is recorded, Robert of Stoufeld (Stowfield). Thus the development of Lydbrook began at Lower Lydbrook. The village takes its name from the brook running its entire length – the 'loud brook' or lud brook to become Lyd Brook. The village developed as a site for the local iron and coal industries with the houses as an encroachment into the Forest tracing the Lyd brook which provided the water needed for industry and domestic use. The development of the encroachment, continued into the Bailiwick of Magna Dean (Mitcheldean), the area which became known as Upper Lydbrook and Joys Green. The village only became a place of population of any size 17th century onwards, but grew steadily since to remain static for almost a century and a half at a population of about 2,500 between the 1850s and the beginning of the 1990s. However, from the beginning of the 1990s the community has begun to slowly depopulate. One call to fame of the recent past, which now is thankfully no longer true, is that Humphrey Phelps, in his book on the Forest of Dean recalls that in the 1950s Lydbrook had the highest incidence of tuberculosis in England.

== Lydbrook presently ==
Lydbrook has a shop and Post Office, a fish and chip shop, many local businesses and pubs. The village is home to the Lydbrook brass band, a flourishing ensemble whose TV appearances include the Lotto Advert in 2014 and Countryfile in 2019. In 2012 Lydbrook was featured on ITV and BBC news due to the fact that the centre of Lydbrook was flooded and under up to 4 feet (1.2 m) of water. This was despite being nearly 1/2 mile (0.80 km) away from the local River Wye which is situated at the bottom of Lydbrook. This was due to a blockage of an old culvert under the road which contains a stream and the surface drainage for the entire village. In 2017, the Forestry Commission commenced a project to introduce Eurasian beavers into an enclosed area of land uphill of the village, as part of a habitat-management programme: among the anticipated outcomes is the reduction in likelihood of further flash floods occurring.

=== Lydbrook Parish Council ===
In 1935, with the creation of the civic parish of Lydbrook, Joys Green became a full part of the parish.

== Industry ==
Although Lydbrook is now developing as a useful centre for exploring both the Wye Valley and the Forest of Dean with its several hotels and bed and breakfast establishments, its traditional connection is with industry especially with the iron, coal and timber industries.

The arrival of the Romans brought with them the iron industry into the forest. The proven presence of a Roman community in Lydbrook provides for the possibility of an early iron industry. There will certainly have been iron ore and coal mines, at low or outcrop level. Records for industry in the post Roman and pre Norman periods are scarce and it is only from the 13th century that numerous records can be found. However, details about Lydbrook can be difficult to isolate, as Lydbrook was not a parish in its own rights, and activity at Lydbrook, is activity at Ruardean or English Bicknor. One attraction of Lydbrook was the northward fast flowing Lyd.

In the 1590s records exist of what became known as the Upper Forge at Lydbrook built by Thomas Bainham and later owned by Robert Devereux, second Earl of Essex. In 1628 it was described as standing on "Hangerbury Common, below the King's Forge". By 1668 the Upper Forge had disappeared. Three other forges existed. The Middle Forge built in the 1590s was opposite what is now Beard's bakery building. After the demise of the original Upper Forge, the Middle Forge eventually took on the name of Upper Forge. The Lower Forge was built in 1610 (standing within two hundred yards from the Wye). Standing up-stream from the Upper Forge was the King's Howbrook Forge (also known as the Lydbrook Forge) built in 1612/13. This stood opposite what is now Brook House (was once the Yew Tree Inn). In March 1650 the Forge was demolished. Not far away and built in the same period was the King's Furnace powered by the Lyd (where the How brook joins the Lyd) this ceased by 1674. By the early 18th century only two forges existed, the Upper Forge (the renamed old Middle Forge) and the Lower Forge. In 1702 a further forge existed, although its location is now unknown, the New Forge. This forge was somewhere between the two others as it took on the name of 'Middle Forge'. By 1818 after many changes of hands both owners and tenants, the Partridge family dominated the iron works at Lydbrook. In 1622 there are details of a grist mill and a battering works nearby a disused cornmill. The Lower Forge became in its turn a Corn Mill. Existing also in Lydbrook around the 1690s was an Anvil making works. Roaring Meg (cannon), on display at Goodrich Castle, was made in Lydbrook in 1649.

By 1798 tinplate production began in Lydbrook through the agency of the Partridge and Allaway families (Thomas Allaway was a tenant of the Patridges). The Upper and Lower Forges had been converted to tinplate works by the Partridges and then were leased by Allaway in 1817. It has been argued that tinplate production began in Lydbrook in 1760, which would have made it the earliest centre for tinplate production. The Allaways firm became 'Pearce & Allaway' in 1820, and then in 1850 'Allaways, Partridge & Co'. In 1871 the business was leased to Richard Thomas who moved into the village and lived at the Poplars, Upper Lydbrook. Thomas expanded his business taking over Lydbrook Colliery and Waterloo Colliery. Richard Thomas died in 1916. The works were closed during the First World War and ceased operating in 1925. The early tin works and rolling mills stood where Meredith & Sons and Lydwood works are today.

In 1818 James Russell purchased the Ironworks upstream of the Upper Forge, opposite the Bell Inn, where he created a wireworks. The enterprise was run by the family until its closure between 1890 and 1900.

In 1912, Harold J Smith purchased land at Stowfield and erected the Lydbrook Cable Works. The First World War provided a number of contracts with employee numbers expanding from 40 to 650 with double shifts being worked. With the end of the War, came a slump in business, and in 1920 the Official Receiver was brought in ending Smith's connection with the factory. The business was bought in 1925 by Edison Swan Electric Company.

With the greater resources available the plant at Stowfield further expanded, and was well placed to help with the Second World War possessing one of only four machines for making lead alloy tube needed for P.L.U.T.O. – (Petroleum Lines Under The Ocean), which allowed fuel to be supplied to the Allied invasion force in Europe from Britain. In the late 1940s, Edison Swan was swallowed up by Associated Electrical Industries. Integrated with the Siemens Brothers Cable Works at Woolwich the Stowfield Factory at its height employed approximately 1,100 people. The Cable Works came to an end in 1966 when the factory was bought by Reed Paper Group, which in its turn was taken over by a Swedish Company SCA.

The 18th and 19th centuries saw the village grow through the rise of industry. The first commercially successful blast furnace was sited in Lydbrook and was working as early as 1608. By the 18th century, Lydbook was an important location for the production of tin plate, and a book published in 1861 compared Lydbrook to Sheffield. At the beginning of the 19th century the iron trade was in decline but the coal industry was growing fast. Lydbrook having its own collieries – Arthur & Edward (also called Waterloo as it opened in 1815), The Deep Level, The Old Soot Bag, The Old Engine, Worrall Hill Mine. Lower Lydbrook's situation by the Wye brought about its importance as being a loading place for coal to be taken by barge to Hereford. The flat bottomed barges were dragged originally by men – until the construction of a tow path in 1811. This trade declined after the construction of the Herefordshire and Gloucestershire Canal, but the canal was soon superseded by the railways, which as far as Lydbrook is concerned has 'come and gone'. The community was served by two railway stations and a halt, Upper Lydbrook (the Halt), Lower Lydbrook and Lydbrook Junction. Not even the famous Lower Lydbrook Viaduct remains which enabled the Severn and Wye Railway from Cinderford via Bilston and Serridge to connect with the Ross and Monmouth Railway. The viaduct rose some 87 feet above the roadway below, linking Forge Hill on the east with Randor on the west. It was built in 1872 and first used 26 August 1874. The line was closed to passengers in 1929 and to goods in 1951. It was dismantled in 1966.

New industries replaced the old with the rise of a cable works, but this closed in 1965, replaced by Reed Corrugated Cases (since mid-1991 renamed SCA Packaging Ltd). Others in Lydbrook found employment with Rank Xerox at Mitcheldean. Other employment in the village is offered through the existence of a small number of light engineering works and three saw mills. The new industries differ from the old because they did not grow out of the Forest because of the minerals, but because of the availability of a work force. Only the saw mills (employing a small number of people) represent a connection with traditional Forest industry. Modern road communications with the surrounding areas has opened the village up to outsiders with the new phenomenon of holiday homes, being once the cottages of the Foresters.

== Local schools ==
Almost forgotten as a fact is the place the churches played in providing education in Lydbrook. Situated in Lower Lydbrook was a school provided by the Goff Endowment Charity. The venture lasted from 1820 to the late 1830s. The school in Upper Lydbrook was founded by the Church of England, which had provided a series of schools throughout the Forest in Mitcheldean, Christ Church, Drybrook, Woodside, the Hawthornes, Lydbrook, Park End, and Cinderford.

The local school was founded by the Reverend Henry Berkin, as part of the National Schools, who erected a chapel schoolroom in 1822. The original building measured 50 feet long by 30 feet wide, and was fitted with benches with railed backs, and in the words of Henry Berkin "will contain about 400 persons". After 1851, with the erection of Holy Jesus Church, the chapel continued as a school and also served as the church hall. In 1872, fifty years on from 1822, the allocation of space being more generous per person, the school was (according to the record of the time) enlarged to "seat 250 pupils". On 20 January 1908 the beginnings of a new school had been erected as the 'Lydbrook Temporary Council School' to 'relieve the Lydbrook National School', with an intake of 35 boys. These will have been the senior boys. The new buildings were being erected across the main road from the old school on the west side of the village. By the autumn of 1909 the new school had been completed. The Headmaster, Mr Bishop transferred with the pupils on 6 September 1909. The school was due to be opened 30 August 1909, but the building work had not been completed so the children had the benefit of being granted an extra week's holiday. The registered number of 26937 belonging to the Lydbrook Church of England Infant School (allotted in April 1897) was transferred to the Lydbrook Council Infants' School, 30 August 1909.

Joys Green school was erected in 1882 as a result of the Education Act of 1870, and was implemented by the Dean School Board which in those years had the management of the schools in the area. School meals began in both schools in the early 1940s.

Currently now, Joys Green Primary School was closed and is now a Young Persons Directorate. All students were transferred to Lydbrook when this happened. The past two Ofsted reports that Lydbrook School have had have given them ratings of Outstanding and Good with Outstanding features.

== Other notable buildings ==
=== The Priory ===
The oldest surviving building in Lydbrook is today known as The Priory, which in fact had never been a Priory, but was originally known as Lidbrook Farm. Once the home of the Probert family. The architectural design requires a date in the mid-16th century for this building, owing to the close timbered framework when oak was more plentiful, as opposed to square timbered style of the later period. There is a secret room in this building and claims for tunnels extending from Courtfield and the Anchor Inn. A Priest hole has been argued for, but smuggling has been suggested as an alternative. The house is also reputed to be haunted.

=== The Old House ===
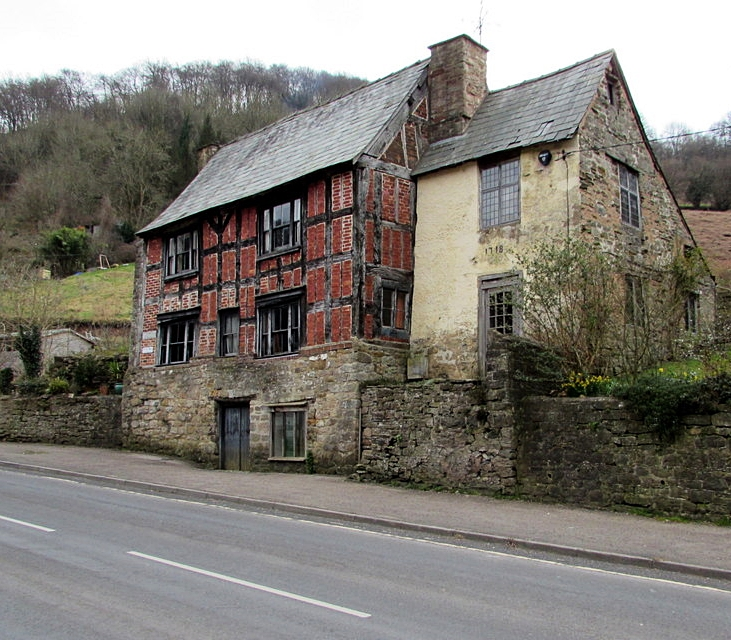
Sarah Siddons House

Further up the village, in Central Lydbrook, opposite The Anchor Inn is the second oldest house in the village. This is (rather confusingly) called The Old House, and is a red-bricked and square-timbered house which at one stage belonged to Roger Kemble, father of Sarah Siddons (née Kemble – a famous actress 1755–1831). It has an extension built on the side which boasts the date '1718'. It is a Grade II* listed building.

Both The Priory and The Old House are situated in the oldest parts of the village in Lower and Central Lydbrook. It would not be surprising if even older structures were eventually discovered within other houses in Lower Lydbrook.

=== Outlying neighbourhoods ===
The two largest centres of housing positioned west and east of the valley are Worrall Hill and Joys Green. The former district took its name from the Worrall family of English Bicknor and the name 'Joys Green' came from Jay's Green on account of the numerous Jays seen in that locality.

== Centres of community ==
=== Old School Rooms ===
The Church of England mission chapel completed in 1822, not only provided a place of Christian worship, but provided a school (hence its title of the old school rooms) and a church hall. After 1909 with a new school replacing the building, and a parish church replacing it as a chapel, the mission hall served as a parish hall with all manner of activities taking place.

=== Reading Rooms ===
Another early meeting place was the old 1 penny reading rooms in Mill Lane. The reading rooms were provided by the owners of the tinplate works which began in the mid-19th century. The reading rooms closed down in 1928/9.

=== Anchor Hall ===
The Anchor Hall adjacent to the Anchor public house provided a meeting place in the early part of the 20th century. A cinema was installed in 1914 run by the Albany Ward Company. The Anchor Hall closed in the mid-1920s.

=== Memorial Hall ===
During the Great War a committee was formed to provide items for the welfare of the servicemen on leave. After the War the committee was left with £100. The committee and the Men's Institute (founded in 1892) formed a general committee and proposed the building of a Memorial Hall. Public subscriptions were sought, and a grant from the United Services Fund of £88 was obtained. The local Women's Institute had an original aim of erecting their own headquarters but joined in with the Memorial Hall committee providing from their own funds £100. In 1920 the committee purchased the building and lands known as 'The Poplars', and on 11 November 1926 the Lydbrook Memorial Hall, Men's and Women's Institute came into being at a cost of £3,150 opened by the blind Victoria Cross holder of Coleford, Captain Angus Buchanan.

== History of Christian worship in Lydbrook ==
=== Church of England and the Lydbrook Mission Chapel ===
In 1809 the Reverend Henry Berkin began his appointment as an assistant curate of the parish of Mitcheldean. Adjoining this parish were Forest areas which have since become the parishes of Drybrook and Lydbrook. Henry Berkin became concerned as to the plight of the Foresters "destitute of churches or ministers whom they could call their own". In 1812 he travelled around the areas of Forest adjoining his parish, visiting cottages where families would gather to hear him teach. Large crowds of up to 200, would gather in some places to hear him explaining the Holy scriptures. In 1814 Henry Berkin moved to a curacy at Weston-under-Penyard, but maintained a connection with the Forest. At Harry Hill, the Foresters encouraged him to build a large place for a regular meeting. After meeting with the Bishop Dr Ryder, Henry Berkin set about building a church, the Foresters could call their own and in 1817 Holy Trinity Church was built, serving both Drybrook and Lydbrook, Henry Berkin becoming the first perpetual curate (now styled 'Vicar'). The missionary work still continued in the cottages at Lydbrook, but it was not too long before Henry Berkin built a small mission chapel to serve Lydbrook in 1821, completed in 1822 (on the site of the present vicarage). The chapel functioned as a school, a place of worship, and as a place for social gatherings. It was served by the assistant priests appointed by Henry Berkin, with residence in Lydbrook. The salary of the curate at Lydbrook was at least in 1835, according to the records, supplied by a gentleman who was above 90 years of age. Lydbrook chapel was the fourth church in the Forest. (Upper Lydbrook being within the Forest boundary). The first church within the Forest was Christ Church in 1816. The second being Holy Trinity. The third church within the Forest was St Paul's, Park End completed at the beginning of 1822.

==== Curates of Holy Trinity serving at the Lydbrook Mission Chapel ====
1821 – Isaac Bridgeman
1822 – J. Herbert
1822 – W. Marshall
1824 – W. Burkitt
1827 – J. Chell
1840 – R. T. Budd
1844 – W. C. Badger
1846 – J. G. Croker
1848 – G. Tatam
1851 – H. Algar

=== Methodist Church ===
In the second decade of the 19th century, the Reverend William Woodall, Wesleyan Methodist minister of Monmouth had established a preaching circuit within the Forest of Dean and as part of this venture, a house was registered for worship in Lydbrook on 15 May 1813. Despite this early foothold, it took until 1864 to build a small chapel in Lower Lydbrook. The chapel was situated almost under the viaduct. From 1824, James Roles of the Oakengates Primitive Methodist circuit had established a circuit of cottage meetings at Pillowell, Lydbrook, Broad Oak, Little Birch, West Hide, Shecknal, Coppice Wood, Garroway Common, and Yorkley. The usual custom of the Primitive Methodists was to name the chapels after Old Testament place names. By 1828 the Primitive Methodists had built the 'Ebenezer Chapel' at Upper Lydbrook. It had the honour of being the first Methodist church in the Forest. It was first enlarged in 1852 (the same year the new parish church was opened). The year after, in 1853 Charles Dickens had published his 'Christmas Stories' containing the 'Christmas Carol' which portrayed the character 'Ebenezer Scrooge' associating the name with a foreboding character. The chapel was further enlarged bringing about the present building completed in 1912, with the name 'Ebenezer' being omitted. A second primitive Methodist chapel 'Mount Tabor' was built at the Reddings in 1862. Schoolrooms were added in 1892. The Wesleyan chapel closed in 1956. The congregation and cause of the Wesleyans had never been very large in Lydbrook. The redundant Wesleyan chapel served as a warehouse until its demolition in 1966. After 1934 with the Methodist Church Union all the chapels belonged to the same denomination and were served by the same minister and two chapels still served the area. Mount Tabor chapel closed in 1960 and was sold and is currently being turned into flats. Sadly on Sunday 28 July 1991 the last of the Methodist chapels in Lydbrook closed. One consolation was that the Sunday school – 'Sandra's group' as it was known, transferred to the parish church to become 'The Sunday Club'.

=== Baptist Church ===
The Baptist church at Lower Lydbrook did not owe its impulse to the Coleford mission but to work carried on in Herefordshire. Mr Edward Goff who died in 1813 had left eleven thousand pounds to establish schools for the benefit of poor children in Herefordshire and places contingent. Schoolmasters were employed during the week for the education of the children, and on the Sunday were employed for preaching. A Mr Wright had established a schoolroom in 1820. The building doubled up for Baptist worship and preaching on Sundays and was licensed as such on 7 November 1823. The work continued in Lydbrook until sometime in the late 1830s. For nearly two decades there existed two chapel schoolrooms. The mission chapel at Upper Lydbrook would have been the larger of the two and by 1935 had grown to such a large size in congregation, thoughts were on enlarging the building. The fortunes of the Baptist cause may not have fared so well as the endowment grant was transferred to Lay Hill Baptist church in Herefordshire proper. Whilst the loss of the schoolmaster meant the loss of a full-time worker for the Baptist cause in Lydbrook, the main concern of the Goff Charity was education, and this was probably being served by the Anglican mission chapel founded a little after. In addition by the middle 1820s the Baptist were competing for the affections of the resident population with four other denominations (Anglican, Wesleyan Methodist, Primitive Methodist, Independent). The church did not survive the loss of the school and schoolmaster. In 1857 twelve members separated from Lays Hill Baptist and re-formed the Lydbrook Baptist Church in the old reading rooms. In 1863 the church appointed its first Minister, and the services at the Old Reading Room were packed to capacity, so land was purchased at Lower Lydbrook, and a church completed and opened in November 1864 at the cost of £700-0-0. In the spring of 1872 a foundation stone of an enlarged chapel was laid, but the work was held up owing to the local navvies taking up work with the creation of Lydbrook branch railway (presumably better paid!). The line was completed in August 1874 and allowed the building of the enlarged chapel to continue, and this was completed in September 1875.

=== United Reformed Church/Congregational ===
The founding of an Independent chapel in Lydbrook may well owe itself to a former Anglican priest. On 11 March 1821, the Reverend Isaac Bridgeman was appointed assistant curate to the Reverend Henry Berkin. In addition to the mission work at Lydbrook, Henry Berkin had founded a chapel-schoolroom at Littledean Hill. Curates to Berkin served at both mission chapels, but were based at Littledean. Bridgeman had developed an affection for nonconformists and often worshipped and worked with them. Due to this 'irregularity' on 4 November 1822, the Bishop of Gloucester revoked his licence and interdicted him from officiating in any church in the Diocese of Gloucester. Bridgeman stayed within the Forest and by 1823 had built up five congregations, one of which was sufficiently large enough to build a chapel 'The Tabernacle' at Brains Green, Blakeney Hill, this becoming Bridgeman's mission base. The congregation at Lydbrook met at the house of James Russell, ironmaster. Bridgeman will have used the following he built up at the Lydbrook Mission Chapel to create the independent congregation. Initially Bridgeman used the Church of England Liturgy but by 1825 had joined himself to the Congregationalists and thus further their missionary endeavours within the Forest of Dean. It was a further sixty one years before the Congregational chapel was built at Worrall Hill in 1884. The chapel was enlarged in 1888. In 1972 it became part of the United Reformed Church with the Union of the Congregational church and Presbyterian church.

=== Mission Chapel, Forge Hill ===
The last of the seven church buildings to be erected in Lydbrook was the Independent mission chapel on Forge Hill, built in 1889. The Reverend Arthur William Latham, Baptist minister at Lydbrook 1883–1900 appears on the Deeds as a Trustee and is also mentioned throughout the account rendered by the solicitor to the Trustees. The Baptist involvement was probably due to a dispute between the founders of the mission as to whether there should be a Trust Deed or not. Mr Latham, Baptist minister for Lydbrook was called in to advise on the Trust Deed. The mission seems to have been, and remained a joint venture between Non-conformists. It certainly always remained an independent venture. Once full to capacity, over the length of years the congregation declined to such a point where only occasional services were held, and the building eventually fell into disuse. Previously to this decline services were held most Sunday afternoons, with an average attendance of 8. A ladies' meeting was held on Thursday evenings. The chapel closed in 1980. When the last remaining Trustee of the mission died (Alderman Stan Hatton), the Charity Commission approached the vicar of Lydbrook (the Reverend Stuart Parker) who organised four new trustees (one from each of the four Lydbrook Churches) to consider the charity's future.

==== Church at Joys Green ====
On 20 August 1989 the first of a series of monthly church services was held at 6 pm at Joys Green School, sponsored by the parish church. The frequency was increased to fortnightly in October 1991. In the summer of 1991 the Baptist followed holding a monthly morning service in the school.

=== Church of Holy Jesus and the Parish of Lydbrook ===
In 1842 the Crown divided the Forest into ecclesiastical districts, one of which was the Holy Trinity district. Within that district, the Forest Church, served the village of Drybrook and the daughter church, the mission chapel served Upper Lydbrook. By the middle 1830s the congregation at the Lydbrook mission chapel had so grown, that in 1835 at a meeting of the Dean Forest Commissioners, following representations from the Bishop of the Diocese and clergy of the Forest, it was recommended that the mission chapel at Lydbrook be enlarged to the status of a church. Although this recommendation was not followed through, in the late 1840s a new church was planned. The work on Lydbrook parish church began in 1850 and was completed in 1851, when Lydbrook became a parish in its own rights and with its own vicar. Although the first building for worship in Lydbrook was erected in 1822, the church began well before then with Henry Berkin's itinerant preaching starting in 1812.

On Sunday 12 August 1850 the foundation stone of the new church was laid. The Reverend J Burdon, Rector of English Bicknor (who was responsible for the spiritual welfare of those living in the area of Lower Lydbrook within his parish) had worked hard to accomplish the building of the church, collaborating with the Reverend H G Nicholls, perpetual curarte of Drybrook, the Reverend William Penfold, perpetual curate of Ruardean (appointed March 1851, Ruardean having become an ecclesiastical parish in its own rights in 1844), and the Reverend E Machen, rector of Mitcheldean. The building cost the grand sum of £3,500. The largest proportion of this money -a generous donation of £2,000 was a gift from Edward T Machen, Deputy surveyor of the Royal Forest (father of the Rector of Mitcheldean) and his relatives. Messrs Allaway-Partridge gave £250 and a grant of £230 given by the 'Incorporated Society for Promoting the Enlargement, Building and Repairing of Churches and Chapels' on the condition that the seats were to be free for the use of the poor for ever. The word 'free' was to be painted in a conspicuous manner on each seat.

As the foundation stone was laid just after the feast of the Name of Jesus (7 August 1850) the dedication became 'The Holy Jesus'. The dedication was once thought to be unique, but two other churches have been discovered of similar dedication although having been built later; a Roman Catholic church in Manchester built in 1869–1872 by the architects J.A. & J.S. Harrison which was dedicated to the Holy Name of Jesus and the Church of the Holy Name, Cumbernauld New Town, Glasgow, part of the Scottish Episcopal Church and dedicated in 1958. The Church at Lydbrook was consecrated on 4 December 1851 by Dr Ollivant, Bishop of Llandaff (Dr Monk, the Bishop of Gloucester being to ill to attend). Upwards of a 1,000 people attended, 50 of these being clergy.

From then on Lydbrook was a parish on its own. In 1858 the reported attendance was 150 attending Matins and 250 attending Evensong! The number of communicants for the parish in that year is given as 40 per week. The present day figure stands at around 35, with a higher average throughout the year of about 40 per week.

The original chapel served as a National Day School until 1909 and was used for church functions until its dilapidation in the 1960s. In 1975 it was demolished to make way for the present vicarage, which is the third in the village. The first vicarage, built in stone stands to the south east of the church 500 yards south, down the course of the old railway line. In May 1879, the vicar, the Reverend Henry Hoitt applied for permission to walk on the line from the vicarage to the church and schools. The Severn and Wye Railway granted this request but limited to Sundays only. The vicarage was sold in 1961 due to extensive repairs needed. The house now serves as a Bed and Breakfast establishment under the name 'The Old Vicarage'. A new house was purchased, 'Mirey Stock' in 1962, 3/4-mile south of the church. This served as the second vicarage. Its distance from the church in severe weather proved impracticable, hence the building of the present vicarage in 1975.

The patronage (or the right to present a priest for appointment as vicar) originally belonged jointly to the Crown and Queen's College, Oxford. The two patrons took turns in presenting new vicars. In 1884 the alternate right of patronage was transferred from Queen's College to the Bishop of Gloucester. In 1961 the Crown transferred its interest in the patronage to the Bishop, leaving the Bishop of the Diocese as the sole patron. Although legally, the Bishop has the right to appoint, advice has to be sought from representatives of the parochial church council.

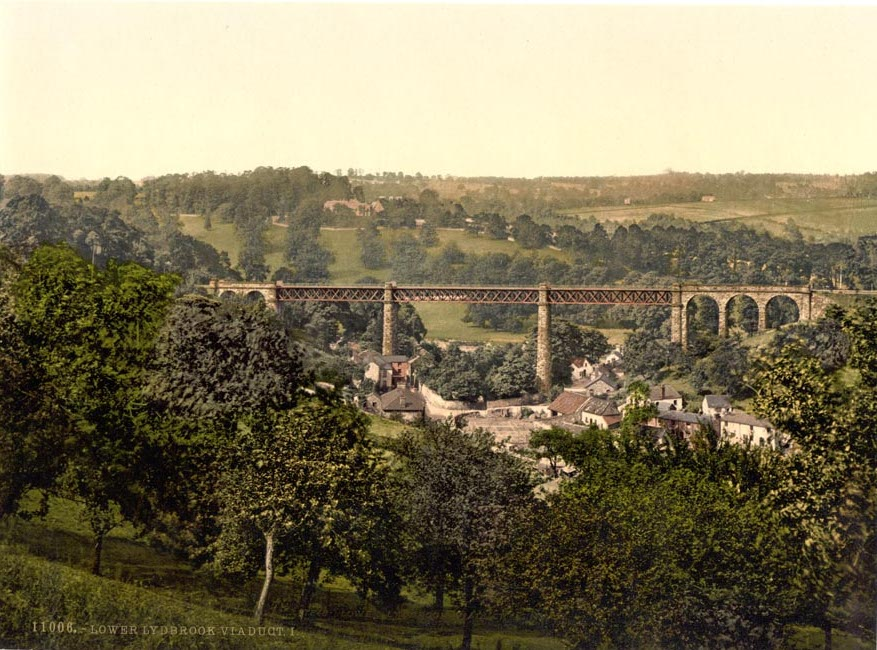
Lydbrook Viaduct

== Railways ==
Lydbrook Junction was a former station on the Ross and Monmouth Railway between Ross-on-Wye and Monmouth Troy running through the scenic Wye Valley which ran from 1873 to 1959.

The station was constructed in the hamlet of Stowfield approximately half a mile from Lydbrook and its viaduct on the Severn and Wye Railway. It was located approximately 4 miles and 34 chains along the railway from Ross-on-Wye station. In 1874 the Severn and Wye Railway opened a branch from Serridge Junction and Cinderford, passenger services commenced in 1875. All passenger trains along the S&W branch were withdrawn from 1929.

== See also ==
- Lower Lydbrook Viaduct
