= Woolaston =

Village in Gloucestershire, England

Coordinates: 51.70°N 02.6°W

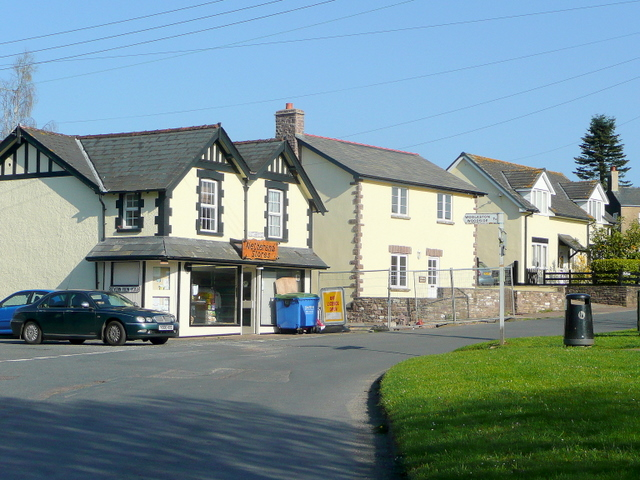
- Woolaston village

- Location within Gloucestershire
- Population: 1,206 (2011)
- OS grid reference: SO594003
- Shire county: Gloucestershire
- Region: South West
- Country: England
- Sovereign state: United Kingdom
- Post town: Lydney
- Postcode district: GL15
- Police: Gloucestershire
- Fire: Gloucestershire
- Ambulance: South Western
- UK Parliament: Forest of Dean

Woolaston is a village and civil parish in the Forest of Dean district of Gloucestershire in South West England. It lies on the north side of the Severn Estuary approximately 5 miles (8.0 kilometres) from the Welsh border at Chepstow and is surrounded by woodland and agricultural land.

== Name ==
Woolaston was named in Domesday as Odelaveston, meaning Wulflaf's village (tun).

== Development of the village ==
The dairy has recently been developed into a small housing development. Recent developments have consolidated rather than expanded the village footprint.

Traveling north west from Netherend with its primary school, village shop and 'The Netherend' pub, you pass what was once the Methodist chapel, then 'Birchwood Road', leading to a housing estate, the 'Ring Fence' a small lane with a number of cottages and houses along it, the 'Rising Sun' one of the village's two public houses and the village allotments.

Woolaston Common is about 1 mile from the main A48 road and north of the main village. Here there is a small hamlet of houses and an area of common ground which, for the most part of the year, is covered in bracken. Adjoining the common is also another hamlet named Sandtumps.

== Governance ==
The village falls in the 'Hewelsfield and Woolaston' electoral ward. This ward stretches from Brockweir in the north east to Woolaston. The total population of the ward taken at the 2011 census was 1,690.

== St. Andrew's Church ==
St. Andrew's parish church at Woolaston is about a mile south west of Netherend along the A48 towards Chepstow. The earliest record of its existence is in 1131. However, the old circular churchyard and the nearby Roman road, which ran just to the north-west of the church, suggest a much earlier holy site. The Tower was originally a low one with a short wooden steeple, but following the granting of a faculty in 1774, it was completely rebuilt. It was threatened with closure in 2007 but at the final Midnight Mass on Christmas Eve it was announced the Church will be saved.

== Stroat Church and ruined Bible Christian chapel ==
Stroat Church (previously known as Stroat Mission) is located three miles out of Woolaston on the A48 towards Chepstow. It has been involved in the village of Woolaston for over 120 years.

Its history began with Squire Morgan and his family in the 1880s. They were evangelical Anglicans with a deep concern for the people of the Parish of Tidenham and in particular for those living in Woodcroft and, these being the distinctly rural areas where they most felt a need to evangelise. Scattered though the community was, the work they embarked upon at Woodcroft prospered. People came to worship from a wide area by whatever means they could, but mostly on foot or by horse and cart. Today the car has replaced the cart and the roads are lined with optical fibre broadband, but the countryside is still much as it was back then.

It was in 1889 that the Morgans bought a plot of ground at Stroat and in that same year erected a corrugated iron building that became known as the Iron Room. As the years rolled on Stroat became independent of Woodcoft.

There is a derelict Bible Christian chapel, built in 1836, on Woodside Road, near its junction with Slade Road.
