= List of civil parishes in Gloucestershire =

This is a list of the 313 civil parishes in the ceremonial county of Gloucestershire, England. The former Cheltenham Municipal Borough and Gloucester County Borough are unparished. Population figures are unavailable for some of the smallest parishes.

Civil parish	Population (2011)	Area (km^{2}) (2011)	Pre-1974 district	District
Acton Turville	370	4.23	Sodbury Rural District	South Gloucestershire
Adlestrop	120	8.00	North Cotswold Rural District	Cotswold
Alderley	351	14.41	Sodbury Rural District	Stroud
Alderton	747	7.70	Cheltenham Rural District	Tewkesbury
Aldsworth	314	20.95	Northleach Rural District	Cotswold
Alkington	688	16.63	Thornbury Rural District	Stroud
Almondsbury	4,705	29.10	Thornbury Rural District	South Gloucestershire
Alveston	2,953	11.05	Thornbury Rural District	South Gloucestershire
Alvington	506	6.59	Lydney Rural District	Forest of Dean
Ampney Crucis	636	13.12	Cirencester Rural District	Cotswold
Ampney St Mary	218	9.02	Cirencester Rural District	Cotswold
Ampney St Peter			Cirencester Rural District	Cotswold
Andoversford	555	1.91	Northleach Rural District	Cotswold
Arlingham	459	10.15	Gloucester Rural District	Stroud
Ashchurch Rural	957	14.24	Cheltenham Rural District	Tewkesbury
Ashleworth	540	7.13	Gloucester Rural District	Tewkesbury
Ashley	131	7.47	Tetbury Rural District	Cotswold
Aston Subedge	107	8.11	North Cotswold Rural District	Cotswold
Aust	532	15.00	Thornbury Rural District	South Gloucestershire
Avening	1,031	6.84	Tetbury Rural District	Cotswold
Awre	1,714	20.40	East Dean Rural District	Forest of Dean
Aylburton	711	7.81	Lydney Rural District	Forest of Dean
Badgeworth	1,286	16.67	Cheltenham Rural District	Tewkesbury
Badminton	271	7.66	Sodbury Rural District	South Gloucestershire
Bagendon	239	4.62	Cirencester Rural District	Cotswold
Barnsley	209	13.67	Cirencester Rural District	Cotswold
Barrington	209	17.21	Northleach Rural District	Cotswold
Batsford			North Cotswold Rural District	Cotswold
Baunton	299	6.95	Cirencester Rural District	Cotswold
Berkeley (town)	2,034	1.29	Thornbury Rural District	Stroud
Beverston	129	10.84	Tetbury Rural District	Cotswold
Bibury	627	21.01	Northleach Rural District	Cotswold
Birdlip			Cheltenham Rural District	Cotswold
Bishop's Cleeve	10,612	7.77	Cheltenham Rural District	Tewkesbury
Bisley-with-Lypiatt	2,142	29.22	Stroud Rural District	Stroud
Bitton	9,171	14.85	Warmley Rural District	South Gloucestershire
Blaisdon	265	7.99	East Dean Rural District	Forest of Dean
Bledington	506	6.23	North Cotswold Rural District	Cotswold
Blockley	2,041	30.52	North Cotswold Rural District	Cotswold
Boddington	266	8.01	Cheltenham Rural District	Tewkesbury
Bourton on the Hill	391	17.84	North Cotswold Rural District	Cotswold
Bourton on the Water	3,296	10.00	North Cotswold Rural District	Cotswold
Boxwell with Leighterton	306	13.85	Tetbury Rural District	Cotswold
Bradley Stoke (town)	20,599	4.52	Sodbury Rural District	South Gloucestershire
Brimpsfield	283	10.53	Cirencester Rural District	Cotswold
Brimscombe and Thrupp	1,830	3.59	Stroud Rural District	Stroud
Broadwell	355	7.21	North Cotswold Rural District	Cotswold
Brockworth	7,387	10.48	Gloucester Rural District	Tewkesbury
Bromesberrow	407	8.14	Newent Rural District	Forest of Dean
Brookthorpe-with-Whaddon	322	6.58	Gloucester Rural District	Stroud
Buckland	205	9.19	Cheltenham Rural District	Tewkesbury
Cainscross	6,479	1.82	Stroud Urban District	Stroud
Cam	8,162	11.82	Dursley Rural District	Stroud
Chaceley	125	6.70	Gloucester Rural District	Tewkesbury
Chalford	6,215	4.67	Stroud Rural District	Stroud
Charfield	2,538	6.66	Thornbury Rural District	South Gloucestershire
Charlton Hayes			Thornbury Rural District	South Gloucestershire
Charlton Kings	10,396	11.58	Charlton Kings Urban District	Cheltenham
Chedworth	802	19.19	Northleach Rural District	Cotswold
Cherington	224	17.36	Tetbury Rural District	Cotswold
Chipping Campden (town)	2,288	22.03	North Cotswold Rural District	Cotswold
Churcham	655	13.10	East Dean Rural District	Forest of Dean
Churchdown	10,990	9.99	Gloucester Rural District	Tewkesbury
Cinderford (town)	8,494	15.87	East Dean Rural District	Forest of Dean
Cirencester (town)	19,076	22.60	Cirencester Urban District	Cotswold
Clapton	124	3.31	North Cotswold Rural District	Cotswold
Coaley	766	9.70	Dursley Rural District	Stroud
Coates	507	10.55	Cirencester Rural District	Cotswold
Coberley	351	14.68	Cheltenham Rural District	Cotswold
Cold Ashton	221	9.25	Sodbury Rural District	South Gloucestershire
Cold Aston	256	9.61	Northleach Rural District	Cotswold
Coleford (town)	8,359	10.21	West Dean Rural District	Forest of Dean
Colesbourne	145	8.87	Cirencester Rural District	Cotswold
Coln St Aldwyns	271	13.86	Northleach Rural District	Cotswold
Coln St Dennis	194	13.58	Northleach Rural District	Cotswold
Compton Abdale	125	8.85	Northleach Rural District	Cotswold
Condicote	213	9.14	North Cotswold Rural District	Cotswold
Corse	578	8.96	Newent Rural District	Forest of Dean
Cowley	337	8.16	Cheltenham Rural District	Cotswold
Cranham	451	7.74	Stroud Rural District	Stroud
Cromhall	1,231	9.76	Thornbury Rural District	South Gloucestershire
Cutsdean			North Cotswold Rural District	Cotswold
Daglingworth	265	8.75	Cirencester Rural District	Cotswold
Deerhurst	906	12.69	Cheltenham Rural District	Tewkesbury
Didmarton	415	11.89	Tetbury Rural District	Cotswold
Dodington	8,206	16.44	Sodbury Rural District	South Gloucestershire
Donnington			North Cotswold Rural District	Cotswold
Dowdeswell	134	8.04	Northleach Rural District	Cotswold
Down Ampney	644	11.23	Cirencester Rural District	Cotswold
Down Hatherley	419	3.45	Gloucester Rural District	Tewkesbury
Downend and Bromley Heath	12,125	2.95	Mangotsfield Urban District	South Gloucestershire
Doynton	320	8.07	Sodbury Rural District	South Gloucestershire
Driffield	171	7.64	Cirencester Rural District	Cotswold
Drybrook	3,052	8.00	East Dean Rural District	Forest of Dean
Dumbleton	576 (including Wormington)	17.08	Cheltenham Rural District	Tewkesbury
Duntisbourne Abbots	225	9.43	Cirencester Rural District	Cotswold
Duntisbourne Rouse			Cirencester Rural District	Cotswold
Dursley (town)	6,697	4.62	Dursley Rural District	Stroud
Dymock	1,214	31.63	Newent Rural District	Forest of Dean
Dyrham and Hinton	296	12.87	Sodbury Rural District	South Gloucestershire
Eastington	1,567	8.16	Gloucester Rural District	Stroud
Eastleach	306	18.23	Northleach Rural District	Cotswold
Ebrington	570	14.50	North Cotswold Rural District	Cotswold
Edgeworth	165	15.53	Cirencester Rural District	Cotswold
Elkstone	248	8.54	Cirencester Rural District	Cotswold
Elmore	219	7.44	Gloucester Rural District	Stroud
Elmstone Hardwicke	296	7.07	Cheltenham Rural District	Tewkesbury
Emersons Green (town) (Renamed from Mangotsfield Rural in 2015)	12,439	4.29	Warmley Rural District	South Gloucestershire
English Bicknor	408	11.95	West Dean Rural District	Forest of Dean
Evenlode	144	6.55	North Cotswold Rural District	Cotswold
Fairford (town)	3,236	17.81	Cirencester Rural District	Cotswold
Falfield	762	9.38	Thornbury Rural District	South Gloucestershire
Farmington	112	9.16	Northleach Rural District	Cotswold
Filton (town)	10,607	4.07	Sodbury Rural District	South Gloucestershire
Forthampton	144	5.08	Gloucester Rural District	Tewkesbury
Frampton Cotterell	6,520	8.45	Sodbury Rural District	South Gloucestershire
Frampton on Severn	1,432	9.51	Gloucester Rural District	Stroud
Fretherne with Saul	701	4.58	Gloucester Rural District	Stroud
Frocester	155	7.56	Gloucester Rural District	Stroud
Gorsley and Kilcot	273	3.59	Newent Rural District	Forest of Dean
Gotherington	995	6.63	Cheltenham Rural District	Tewkesbury
Great Rissington	367	10.07	North Cotswold Rural District	Cotswold
Great Oldbury				Stroud
Great Witcombe			Cheltenham Rural District	Tewkesbury
Gretton	443	4.27	Cheltenham Rural District	Tewkesbury
Guiting Power	296	8.89	North Cotswold Rural District	Cotswold
Ham and Stone	711	17.91	Thornbury Rural District	Stroud
Hamfallow	1,064	15.43	Thornbury Rural District	Stroud
Hampnett			Northleach Rural District	Cotswold
Hanham Abbots	5,845	4.28	Warmley Rural District	South Gloucestershire
Hanham	6,128	1.57	Kingswood Urban District	South Gloucestershire
Hardwicke	3,901	8.14	Gloucester Rural District	Stroud
Harescombe	247	5.48	Gloucester Rural District	Stroud
Haresfield	378	9.52	Gloucester Rural District	Stroud
Hartpury	1,642	14.84	Newent Rural District	Forest of Dean
Hasfield	131	5.85	Gloucester Rural District	Tewkesbury
Hatherop	192	5.50	Cirencester Rural District	Cotswold
Hawkesbury	1,263	23.75	Sodbury Rural District	South Gloucestershire
Hawling	224	29.59	Cheltenham Rural District	Tewkesbury
Hazleton	168	12.00	Northleach Rural District	Cotswold
Hewelsfield and Brockweir	484	8.03	Lydney Rural District	Forest of Dean
Highnam	1,936	10.42	Gloucester Rural District	Tewkesbury
Hill	117	8.40	Thornbury Rural District	South Gloucestershire
Hillesley and Tresham	350	2.61	Sodbury Rural District	Stroud
Hinton	1,083	7.80	Thornbury Rural District	Stroud
Horsley	820	12.39	Stroud Rural District	Stroud
Horton	355	14.50	Sodbury Rural District	South Gloucestershire
Hucclecote	1,332	0.88	Gloucester Rural District	Tewkesbury
Huntley	1,105	5.78	East Dean Rural District	Forest of Dean
Hunts Grove			Gloucester Rural District	Stroud
Icomb	202	9.89	North Cotswold Rural District	Cotswold
Innsworth	2,468	3.43	Gloucester Rural District	Tewkesbury
Iron Acton	1,346	13.30	Sodbury Rural District	South Gloucestershire
Kemble and Ewen	1,036	14.26	Cirencester Rural District	Cotswold
Kempley	280	6.81	Newent Rural District	Forest of Dean
Kempsford	1,123	17.31	Cirencester Rural District	Cotswold
King's Stanley	2,359	6.71	Stroud Rural District	Stroud
Kingscote	273	15.76	Tetbury Rural District	Cotswold
Kingswood (South Gloucestershire)			Kingswood Urban District	South Gloucestershire
Kingswood (Stroud)	1,395	9.56	Dursley Rural District	Stroud
Lechlade (town)	2,850	16.22	Cirencester Rural District	Cotswold
Leckhampton with Warden Hill	4,409	1.81	Cheltenham Rural District	Cheltenham
Leigh	303	6.08	Cheltenham Rural District	Tewkesbury
Leonard Stanley	1,446	3.34	Stroud Rural District	Stroud
Little Rissington	280	4.28	North Cotswold Rural District	Cotswold
Littledean	1,296	6.47	East Dean Rural District	Forest of Dean
Long Newnton	211	8.85	Tetbury Rural District	Cotswold
Longborough	471	12.25	North Cotswold Rural District	Cotswold
Longford	1,218	1.97	Gloucester Rural District	Tewkesbury
Longhope	1,489	12.27	East Dean Rural District	Forest of Dean
Longney and Epney	285	7.46	Gloucester Rural District	Stroud
Lower Slaughter	223	3.94	North Cotswold Rural District	Cotswold
Lydbrook	2,192	4.94	West Dean Rural District	Forest of Dean
Lydney (town)	8,776	20.90	Lydney Rural District	Forest of Dean
Maisemore	458	7.52	Gloucester Rural District	Tewkesbury
Maiseyhampton	566	8.23	Cirencester Rural District	Cotswold
Marshfield	1,716	23.89	Sodbury Rural District	South Gloucestershire
Maugersbury	136	7.08	North Cotswold Rural District	Cotswold
Mickleton	1,676	10.51	North Cotswold Rural District	Cotswold
Minchinhampton	5,267	19.09	Stroud Rural District	Stroud
Minsterworth	444	7.33	Gloucester Rural District	Tewkesbury
Miserden	449	11.29	Stroud Rural District	Stroud
Mitcheldean (town)	2,783	10.39	East Dean Rural District	Forest of Dean
Moreton Valence	151	6.60	Gloucester Rural District	Stroud
Moreton in Marsh (town)	3,493	6.09	North Cotswold Rural District	Cotswold
Nailsworth (town)	5,794	6.03	Nailsworth Urban District	Stroud
Naunton	352	13.47	North Cotswold Rural District	Cotswold
Newent (town)	5,207	26.45	Newent Rural District	Forest of Dean
Newland	1,033	19.30	West Dean Rural District	Forest of Dean
Newnham	1,296	8.20	Gloucester Rural District	Forest of Dean
North Cerney	582	16.83	Cirencester Rural District	Cotswold
North Nibley	883	13.20	Dursley Rural District	Stroud
Northleach with Eastington (town)	1,854	21.96	Northleach Rural District	Cotswold
Northway	5,080	1.76	Cheltenham Rural District	Tewkesbury
Norton	439	7.97	Gloucester Rural District	Tewkesbury
Notgrove	184	15.76	Northleach Rural District	Cotswold
Nympsfield	382	9.54	Dursley Rural District	Stroud
Oddington	417	7.34	North Cotswold Rural District	Cotswold
Oldbury-upon-Severn	780	18.94	Thornbury Rural District	South Gloucestershire
Oldland	15,100	3.60	Warmley Rural District	South Gloucestershire
Olveston	2,033	16.46	Thornbury Rural District	South Gloucestershire
Owlpen			Dursley Rural District	Stroud
Oxenhall	243	9.08	Newent Rural District	Forest of Dean
Oxenton	162	7.72	Cheltenham Rural District	Tewkesbury
Ozleworth			Tetbury Rural District	Cotswold
Painswick	3,026	25.47	Stroud Rural District	Stroud
Patchway (town)	10,511	4.34	Thornbury Rural District	South Gloucestershire
Pauntley	307	7.72	Newent Rural District	Forest of Dean
Pilning and Severn Beach	3,647	15.36	Thornbury Rural District	South Gloucestershire
Pitchcombe	232	2.03	Stroud Rural District	Stroud
Poole Keynes	188	4.92	Cirencester Rural District	Cotswold
Poulton	408	6.48	Cirencester Rural District	Cotswold
Prescott			Cheltenham Rural District	Tewkesbury
Prestbury	6,981	5.70	Cheltenham Rural District	Cheltenham
Preston	327	8.17	Cirencester Rural District	Cotswold
Pucklechurch	2,904	9.15	Sodbury Rural District	South Gloucestershire
Quedgeley	17,519	5.76	Gloucester Rural District	Gloucester
Quenington	603	8.68	Cirencester Rural District	Cotswold
Randwick	1,423	1.98	Stroud Rural District	Stroud
Rangeworthy	675	6.72	Thornbury Rural District	South Gloucestershire
Redmarley D'Abitot	756	15.31	Newent Rural District	Forest of Dean
Rendcomb	354	10.68	Cirencester Rural District	Cotswold
Rockhampton	166	4.06	Thornbury Rural District	South Gloucestershire
Rodborough	5,334	4.95	Stroud Rural District	Stroud
Rodmarton	333	13.16	Cirencester Rural District	Cotswold
Ruardean	1,399	5.94	East Dean Rural District	Forest of Dean
Rudford and Highleadon	288	5.28	Newent Rural District	Forest of Dean
Ruspidge and Soudley	2,472	14.85	East Dean Rural District	Forest of Dean
Saintbury			North Cotswold Rural District	Cotswold
Sandhurst	469	8.78	Gloucester Rural District	Tewkesbury
Sapperton	412	15.86	Cirencester Rural District	Cotswold
Sevenhampton	333	11.62	Northleach Rural District	Cotswold
Sezincote			North Cotswold Rural District	Cotswold
Sherborne	309	18.47	Northleach Rural District	Cotswold
Shipton Moyne	265	9.47	Tetbury Rural District	Cotswold
Shipton	365	10.93	Northleach Rural District	Cotswold
Shurdington	1,936	8.61	Cheltenham Rural District	Tewkesbury
Siddington	1,249	8.62	Cirencester Rural District	Cotswold
Siston	4,552	8.15	Warmley Rural District	South Gloucestershire
Slimbridge	1,136	16.36	Dursley Rural District	Stroud
Snowshill	164	9.39	Cheltenham Rural District	Tewkesbury
Sodbury (town)	5,045	15.53	Sodbury Rural District	South Gloucestershire
Somerford Keynes	479	7.80	Cirencester Rural District	Cotswold
South Cerney	3,464	12.44	Cirencester Rural District	Cotswold
Southam	1,175	21.66	Cheltenham Rural District	Tewkesbury
Southrop	245	6.40	Northleach Rural District	Cotswold
St Briavels	1,192	18.60	Lydney Rural District	Forest of Dean
Standish	227	11.72	Gloucester Rural District	Stroud
Stanton	198	7.34	Cheltenham Rural District	Tewkesbury
Stanway	343	18.29	Cheltenham Rural District	Tewkesbury
Staple Hill and Mangotsfield			Mangotsfield Urban District	South Gloucestershire
Staunton Coleford	287	6.19	West Dean Rural District	Forest of Dean
Staunton	793	6.03	Newent Rural District	Forest of Dean
Staverton	572	4.18	Cheltenham Rural District	Tewkesbury
Stinchcombe	480	7.79	Dursley Rural District	Stroud
Stoke Gifford	15,494	7.01	Sodbury Rural District	South Gloucestershire
Stoke Lodge and The Common			Thornbury Rural District	South Gloucestershire
Stoke Park and Cheswick			Thornbury Rural District	South Gloucestershire
Stoke Orchard	435	10.05	Cheltenham Rural District	Tewkesbury
Stonehouse (town)	7,725	4.94	Stroud Rural District	Stroud
Stow on the Wold (town)	2,042	1.50	North Cotswold Rural District	Cotswold
Stroud (town)	13,259	7.35	Stroud Urban District	Stroud
Sudeley			Cheltenham Rural District	Tewkesbury
Swell	389	14.48	North Cotswold Rural District	Cotswold
Swindon	1,778	3.07	Cheltenham Rural District	Cheltenham
Syde			Cirencester Rural District	Cotswold
Taynton	438	10.29	Newent Rural District	Forest of Dean
Teddington	393	7.03	Cheltenham Rural District	Tewkesbury
Temple Guiting	463	44.87	North Cotswold Rural District	Cotswold
Tetbury Upton	309	15.42	Tetbury Rural District	Cotswold
Tetbury (town)	5,472	1.95	Tetbury Rural District	Cotswold
Tewkesbury (town)	10,704	12.38	Tewkesbury Municipal Borough	Tewkesbury
Thornbury (town)	12,063	16.88	Thornbury Rural District	South Gloucestershire
Tibberton	565	5.67	Newent Rural District	Forest of Dean
Tidenham	5,486	26.25	Lydney Rural District	Forest of Dean
Tirley	428	7.77	Gloucester Rural District	Tewkesbury
Toddington	419	11.52	Cheltenham Rural District	Tewkesbury
Todenham	364	16.94	North Cotswold Rural District	Cotswold
Tormarton	348	16.41	Sodbury Rural District	South Gloucestershire
Tortworth	147	6.38	Thornbury Rural District	South Gloucestershire
Turkdean			Northleach Rural District	Cotswold
Twigworth	309	2.00	Gloucester Rural District	Tewkesbury
Twyning	1,560	12.90	Cheltenham Rural District	Tewkesbury
Tytherington and Itchington	666	9.06	Thornbury Rural District	South Gloucestershire
Uckington	605	3.57	Cheltenham Rural District	Tewkesbury
Uley	1,151	6.12	Dursley Rural District	Stroud
Up Hatherley	6,072	1.28	Cheltenham Rural District	Cheltenham
Upleadon	276	6.44	Newent Rural District	Forest of Dean
Upper Rissington	1,046	1.68	North Cotswold Rural District	Cotswold
Upper Slaughter	177	12.30	North Cotswold Rural District	Cotswold
Upton St. Leonards	2,276	9.83	Gloucester Rural District	Stroud
West Dean	10,242	45.09	West Dean Rural District	Forest of Dean
Westbury on Severn	1,792	33.63	Gloucester Rural District	Forest of Dean
Westcote	208	6.26	North Cotswold Rural District	Cotswold
Westerleigh and Coalpit Heath	3,399	15.65	Sodbury Rural District	South Gloucestershire
Weston Subedge	431	10.50	North Cotswold Rural District	Cotswold
Westonbirt with Lasborough	190	10.42	Tetbury Rural District	Cotswold
Wheatpieces	3,577	2.44	Cheltenham Rural District	Tewkesbury
Whiteshill and Ruscombe	1,161	1.71	Stroud Rural District	Stroud
Whitminster	881	4.82	Gloucester Rural District	Stroud
Whittington	224	6.90	Northleach Rural District	Cotswold
Wick and Abson	1,989	8.40	Sodbury Rural District	South Gloucestershire
Wick Rissington			North Cotswold Rural District	Cotswold
Wickwar	1,978	13.82	Sodbury Rural District	South Gloucestershire
Willersey	816	5.09	North Cotswold Rural District	Cotswold
Winchcombe (town)	4,538	18.22	Cheltenham Rural District	Tewkesbury
Windrush			Northleach Rural District	Cotswold
Winson			Northleach Rural District	Cotswold
Winstone	270	8.57	Cirencester Rural District	Cotswold
Winterbourne	8,965	12.39	Sodbury Rural District	South Gloucestershire
Withington	532	23.93	Northleach Rural District	Cotswold
Woodchester	1,206	5.08	Stroud Rural District	Stroud
Woodmancote	3,029	3.58	Cheltenham Rural District	Tewkesbury
Woolaston	1,206	11.50	Lydney Rural District	Forest of Dean
Wormington			Cheltenham Rural District	Tewkesbury
Wotton-under-Edge (town)	5,627	18.92	Dursley Rural District	Stroud
Yanworth	112	8.56	Northleach Rural District	Cotswold
Yate (town)	21,603	8.62	Sodbury Rural District	South Gloucestershire

== See also ==
- List of civil parishes in England
