= Cirencester and Tewkesbury =

Former parliamentary constituency in the United Kingdom

- Former county constituency for the House of Commons
- County: Gloucestershire
- Major settlements: Cirencester, Tewkesbury

1918–1997
- Seats: One
- Created from: Cirencester and Tewkesbury
- Replaced by: The Cotswolds; Tewkesbury

Cirencester and Tewkesbury was a parliamentary constituency in Gloucestershire which returned one Member of Parliament (MP) to the House of Commons of the Parliament of the United Kingdom. It was created for the 1918 general election and abolished for the 1997 general election when it was partly replaced by the new constituencies of Cotswold and Tewkesbury.

== History ==
The only party to have returned an MP for this constituency was the Conservatives, who represented it for most of the seat's existence. The exception was the period from 1951 to 1959, when William Morrison, first elected as a Conservative, became the Speaker of the House of Commons, a role in which the incumbent is traditionally unaffiliated to a party. The seat centred on the towns of Cirencester and Tewkesbury, covering much of the Cotswolds, a picturesque rolling landscape designated an Area of Outstanding Natural Beauty (AONB) in 1966. The seat was divided between the Cotswold (later renamed The Cotswolds) and Tewkesbury constituencies. Its last MP, Geoffrey Clifton-Brown, went on to represent the Cotswold constituency upon its 1997 creation. At elections contested by the major parties, Cirencester and Tewkesbury generally elected Conservatives with large majorities, and thus could usually have been classed as a safe seat for the party.

== Boundaries ==
1918–1950: The Borough of Tewkesbury, the Urban Districts of Cirencester, Stow-on-the-Wold, and Tetbury, the Rural Districts of: Campden, Cirencester, Marston Sicca, Northleach, and Pebworth, and parts of the Rural Districts of Cheltenham, Faringdon, Stow-on-the-Wold, Tetbury, Tewkesbury, and Winchcombe.

1950–1955: The Borough of Tewkesbury, the Urban District of Cirencester, and the Rural Districts of Cheltenham, Cirencester, North Cotswold, Northleach, and Tetbury.

1955–1974: The Borough of Tewkesbury, the Urban District of Cirencester, and the Rural Districts of Cheltenham, Cirencester, North Cotswold, and Northleach.

1974–1983: As prior but with redrawn boundaries.

1983–1997: The District of Cotswold wards of Ampneys, Beacon, Blockley, Bourton-on-the-Water, Campden, Churn Valley, Cirencester Abbey, Cirencester Beeches, Cirencester Chesterton, Cirencester Stratton, Cirencester Watermoor, Coln, Ermin, Evenlode Vale, Fairford, Fossehill, Fosseridge, Hampton, Kempsford, Lechlade, Mickleton, Moreton-in-Marsh, Northleach, Sandywell, Sherborne Brook, Stow-on-the-Wold, Thames Head, Three Rivers, Vale, and Water Park, and the Borough of Tewkesbury wards of Ashchurch, Bishop's Cleeve East, Bishop's Cleeve North, Bishop's Cleeve South, Cleeve Hill, Coombe Hill, Crickley, Dumbleton, Gotherington, Shurdington, Swindon, Tewkesbury Mitton, Tewkesbury Newtown, Tewkesbury Prior's Park, Tewkesbury Town, Twyning, and Winchcombe.

== Members of Parliament ==
Election	Member	Party
1918	Sir Thomas Davies	Conservative
1929	William Morrison	Conservative
1951	William Morrison	Speaker
1959	Nicholas Ridley	Conservative
1992	Geoffrey Clifton-Brown	Conservative
1997	constituency abolished	

== Elections ==
=== Elections in the 1990s ===
General election 1992: Cirencester and Tewkesbury
Party	Candidate	Votes	%	±%
Conservative	Geoffrey Clifton-Brown	40,258	55.6	+0.2
Liberal Democrats	Edward J. Weston	24,200	33.4	−2.6
Labour	Trevor A. Page	7,262	10.0	+1.8
Natural Law	R. Clayton	449	0.6	New
Independent	P. A. Trice-Rolph	287	0.4	New
Majority		16,058	22.2	+2.8
Turnout		72,456	82.1	+4.2
Registered electors		88,299		+5.0
Conservative hold		Swing	+1.4	

=== Elections in the 1980s ===
General election 1987: Cirencester and Tewkesbury
Party	Candidate	Votes	%	±%
Conservative	Nicholas Ridley	36,272	55.4	−1.8
Liberal	Philip Beckerlegge	23,610	36.0	+1.9
Labour	Doug Naysmith	5,342	8.2	−0.5
Male OAP	MacDonald Curtis	283	0.4	New
Majority		12,662	19.4	−3.7
Turnout		65,507	77.9	+3.0
Registered electors		84,071		+5.0
Conservative hold		Swing	−1.9	

General election 1983: Cirencester and Tewkesbury
Party	Candidate	Votes	%	±%
Conservative	Nicholas Ridley	34,282	57.2	+1.2
Liberal	Philip T Beckerlegge	20,455	34.1	+7.3
Labour	Terence JR Penny	5,243	8.7	−8.5
Majority		13,827	23.1	−6.1
Turnout		59,980	74.9	−5.8
Registered electors		80,067		+8.6
Conservative hold		Swing	−3.0	

=== Elections in the 1970s ===
General election 1979: Cirencester and Tewkesbury
Party	Candidate	Votes	%	±%
Conservative	Nicholas Ridley	37,651	56.0	+9.1
Liberal	Philip T Beckerlegge	18,057	26.8	−3.6
Labour	RS Trafford	11,575	17.2	−5.5
Majority		19,594	29.2	+12.7
Turnout		67,283	78.7	+2.0
Registered electors		85,444		+6.3
Conservative hold		Swing	+6.3	

General election October 1974: Cirencester and Tewkesbury
Party	Candidate	Votes	%	±%
Conservative	Nicholas Ridley	28,930	46.9	−0.4
Liberal	RG Otter	18,770	30.4	−1.4
Labour	JR Booth	13,973	22.7	+1.8
Majority		10,160	16.5	+1.0
Turnout		61,673	76.7	−5.9
Registered electors		80,388		+0.8
Conservative hold		Swing	+0.5	

General election February 1974: Cirencester and Tewkesbury
Party	Candidate	Votes	%	±%
Conservative	Nicholas Ridley	31,163	47.3	−8.7
Liberal	RG Otter	20,962	31.8	+17.7
Labour	RG Fox	13,775	20.9	−9.0
Majority		10,201	15.5	−10.6
Turnout		65,900	82.6	+8.7
Registered electors		79,739		
Conservative hold		Swing		

General election 1970: Cirencester and Tewkesbury
Party	Candidate	Votes	%	±%
Conservative	Nicholas Ridley	30,217	56.0	−2.2
Labour	Howard G Lovell	16,131	29.9	−11.9
Liberal	Denys Robinson	7,593	14.1	New
Majority		14,086	26.1	+9.7
Turnout		53,941	73.9	−1.0
Registered electors		72,980		+14.8
Conservative hold		Swing	+4.9	

=== Elections in the 1960s ===
General election 1966: Cirencester and Tewkesbury
Party	Candidate	Votes	%	±%
Conservative	Nicholas Ridley	27,690	58.2	+6.7
Labour	Michael George Dalling	19,919	41.8	+9.5
Majority		7,771	16.4	−2.8
Turnout		47,609	74.9	−3.1
Registered electors		63,568		+3.2
Conservative hold		Swing	−1.5	

General election 1964: Cirencester and Tewkesbury
Party	Candidate	Votes	%	±%
Conservative	Nicholas Ridley	24,786	51.5	−11.8
Labour	John M Bowyer	15,518	32.3	−4.4
Liberal	Arnold Geoffroy de Montmorency	7,790	16.2	New
Majority		9,268	19.2	−7.4
Turnout		48,094	78.0	+1.4
Registered electors		61,626		+6.1
Conservative hold		Swing	−3.7	

=== Elections in the 1950s ===
General election 1959: Cirencester and Tewkesbury
Party	Candidate	Votes	%	±%
Conservative	Nicholas Ridley	28,169	63.3	N/A
Labour	John M Bowyer	16,314	36.7	New
Majority		11,855	26.6	N/A
Turnout		44,483	76.6	+8.3
Registered electors		58,099		+5.1
Conservative gain from Speaker				

General election 1955: Cirencester and Tewkesbury
Party	Candidate	Votes	%	±%
Speaker	William Morrison	25,372	67.2	+7.7
Independent Labour	Douglas C Cox	12,394	32.8	New
Majority		12,978	34.4	+15.4
Turnout		37,766	68.3	−9.7
Registered electors		55,305		−4.8
Speaker gain from Conservative				

General election 1951: Cirencester and Tewkesbury
Party	Candidate	Votes	%	±%
Conservative	William Morrison	26,978	59.5	+7.6
Labour	Albert E Sumbler	18,353	40.5	+6.5
Majority		8,625	19.0	+1.0
Turnout		45,331	78.0	−3.3
Registered electors		58,103		+2.4
Conservative hold		Swing	+0.5	

General election 1950: Cirencester and Tewkesbury
Party	Candidate	Votes	%	±%
Conservative	William Morrison	23,942	51.9	
Labour	R.M Bennett	15,660	33.9	
Liberal	Norman Wilburn Gillett	6,102	13.2	
Communist	Wogan Philipps	423	0.9	
Majority		8,282	18.0	
Turnout		46,127	81.3	
Registered electors		56,763		
Conservative hold				

=== Election in the 1940s ===
General election 1945: Cirencester and Tewkesbury
Party	Candidate	Votes	%	±%
Conservative	William Morrison	19,490	48.1	N/A
Labour	Alan Ernest Gwynn Hawkins	12,380	30.5	New
Liberal	Christopher Money Harris	8,681	21.4	New
Majority		7,110	17.6	N/A
Turnout		40,551	67.7	N/A
Registered electors		59,890		N/A
Conservative hold				

=== Elections in the 1930s ===
General Election 1939–40: Another General Election was required to take place before the end of 1940. The political parties had been making preparations for an election to take place and by the Autumn of 1939, the following candidates had been selected;

- Conservative: William Morrison
- Popular Front: William Robert Robins

General election 1935: Cirencester and Tewkesbury
Party	Candidate	Votes	%	±%
Conservative	William Morrison	Unopposed		
Conservative hold				

General election 1931: Cirencester and Tewkesbury
Party	Candidate	Votes	%	±%
Conservative	William Morrison	28,170	82.8	+27.2
Labour	John Griffin	5,868	17.2	−2.6
Majority		22,302	65.6	+34.5
Turnout		34,038	71.7	−4.6
Registered electors		47,467		+2.9
Conservative hold		Swing	+17.6	

=== Elections in the 1920s ===
General election 1929: Cirencester and Tewkesbury
Party	Candidate	Votes	%	±%
Unionist	William Morrison	19,584	55.6	−16.4
Liberal	Christopher a'Beckett Williams	8,629	24.5	New
Labour	E.W. Fredman	6,987	19.8	−8.2
Majority		10,955	31.1	−12.9
Turnout		35,200	76.3	+7.9
Registered electors		46,109		+24.8
Unionist hold				

General election 1924: Cirencester and Tewkesbury
Party	Candidate	Votes	%	±%
Unionist	Thomas Davies	18,201	72.0	+5.8
Labour	Joseph Alpass	7,078	28.0	−5.8
Majority		11,123	44.0	+11.6
Turnout		25,279	68.4	+4.8
Unionist hold		Swing	+5.8	

General election 1923: Cirencester and Tewkesbury
Party	Candidate	Votes	%	±%
Unionist	Thomas Davies	15,406	66.2	+2.0
Labour	William Robert Robins	7,849	33.8	−2.0
Majority		7,557	32.4	+4.0
Turnout		23,255	63.6	−7.7
Registered electors		36,573		+1.6
Unionist hold		Swing	+2.1	

General election 1922: Cirencester and Tewkesbury
Party	Candidate	Votes	%	±%
Unionist	Thomas Davies	16,463	64.2	+7.5
Labour	William Robert Robins	9,195	35.8	New
Majority		7,268	28.4	+15.0
Turnout		25,658	71.3	+15.0
Registered electors		36,008		+2.7
Unionist hold				

=== Election in the 1910s ===
General election 1918: Cirencester and Tewkesbury
Party		Candidate	Votes	%	±%
C	Unionist	Thomas Davies	11,171	56.7	
	Independent Labour	Joseph Alpass	8,546	43.3	
Majority			2,625	13.4	
Turnout			19,717	56.3	
Registered electors			35,049		
	Unionist win (new seat)				
C indicates candidate endorsed by the coalition government.

== See also ==
- List of parliamentary constituencies in Gloucestershire

Parliament of the United Kingdom
Preceded by Hexham	Constituency represented by the speaker 1951–1959	Succeeded by Cities of London and Westminster
