= Barton Regis =

Barton Regis may refer to:

- Barton Regis Hundred, an ancient subdivision of Gloucestershire, England
- Barton Regis Rural District, a local government unit in Gloucestershire from 1894 to 1904
