= Great Oldbury =

Coordinates: 51.7566°N 2.3072°W

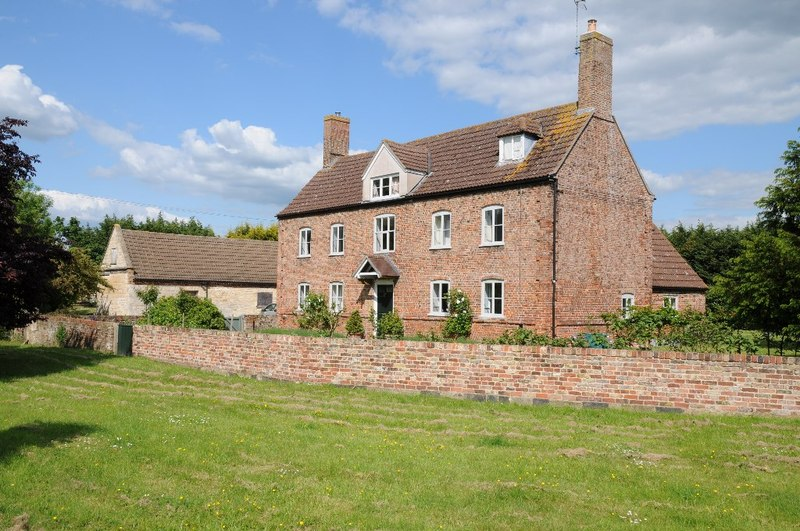
- Nastend Farmhouse

- Location within Gloucestershire
- Civil parish: Great Oldbury
- District: Stroud
- Shire county: Gloucestershire
- Region: South West
- Country: England
- Sovereign state: United Kingdom
- Police: Gloucestershire
- Fire: Gloucestershire
- Ambulance: South Western

Great Oldbury is a civil parish in the Stroud district, in Gloucestershire, England. The parish was formed on 1 April 2024 from Eastington, Standish and Stonehouse.

Schools in the parish include Great Oldbury Primary Academy.
