= Gloucester Rural District =

Former local government area in the UK

Coordinates: 51.867°N 2.249°W

Gloucester
- Area
  - 1911: 30,680 acres (124.2 km^{2})
  - 1961: 70,817 acres (286.59 km^{2})
- Population
  - 1901: 10,779
  - 1931: 14,840
  - 1971: 37,397
- History
  - Created: 1894
  - Abolished: 1974
  - Succeeded by: Forest of Dean, Stroud, Tewkesbury
- Status: Rural district
  - HQ: Gloucester

Gloucester was, from 1894 to 1974, a rural district in the administrative county of Gloucestershire, England. The district did not include the City of Gloucester, which was a separate county borough. In 1935, Gloucester RD was more than doubled in size.

== Formation ==
The Rural District was created by the Local Government Act 1894 as successor to Gloucester Rural Sanitary District. It was governed by a directly elected Rural District Council (RDC), which replaced the Rural Sanitary Authority that had comprised the poor law guardians for the area.

== Boundary Changes ==
Under the Local Government Act 1929 County Councils were given the duty of reviewing all urban and rural districts within their area. In Gloucestershire, there were a number of very small districts, and under the County of Gloucester Review Order 1935, Gloucester RD was enlarged by the transfer of the whole or parts of five abolished districts.

Between 1951 and 1967, a number of suburban areas adjacent to Gloucester were removed from the Rural District, when the city boundary was expanded.

== Parishes ==
The district comprised the following civil parishes:

Parish	Notes
Arlingham	Transferred from abolished Wheatenhurst Rural District in 1935.
Ashleworth	
Barnwood	Abolished in 1967 with most of area passing to Gloucester County Borough
Brockworth	
Brookthorpe, renamed Brookthorpe with Whaddon 1956	Transferred from abolished Wheatenhurst Rural District in 1935.
Chaceley	Transferred from abolished Tewkesbury Rural District 1935.
Churchdown	
Down Hatherley	
Eastington	Transferred from abolished Wheatenhurst Rural District in 1935.
Elmore	
Forthampton	Transferred from abolished Tewkesbury Rural District 1935.
Frampton on Severn	Transferred from abolished Wheatenhurst Rural District in 1935.
Fretherne with Saul	Transferred from abolished Wheatenhurst Rural District in 1935.
Frocester	Transferred from abolished Wheatenhurst Rural District in 1935.
Hardwicke	Transferred from abolished Wheatenhurst Rural District 1935.
Harescombe	Transferred from abolished Wheatenhurst Rural District 1935.
Haresfield	Transferred from abolished Wheatenhurst Rural District 1935.
Hasfield	Transferred from abolished Tewkesbury Rural District 1935.
Hempsted	Absorbed by Gloucester County Borough 1967.
Highnam	Formed 1935 by union of Highnam Over, Lassington parishes.
Highnam Over	Became part of Highnam parish 1935.
Hucclecote	
Innsworth: renamed from Longlevens 1967	
Lassington	Became part of Highnam parish 1935.
Longford	Transferred from abolished Wheatenhurst Rural District 1935.
Longlevens: renamed Innsworth 1967	Created 1935 from part of Wotton St Mary Without
Longney	
Maisemore	
Matson	Absorbed by Gloucester County Borough 1935.
Minsterworth	Transferred from abolished East Dean and United Parishes Rural District 1935
Moreton Valence	Transferred from abolished Wheatenhurst Rural District 1935.
Newnham	Formerly an urban district, abolished 1935
Norton	
Prinknash Park	Absorbed by Upton St Leonards parish 1935
Quedgeley	
Sandhurst	
Standish	Transferred from abolished Wheatenhurst Rural District 1935.
Tirley	Transferred from abolished Tewkesbury Rural District 1935.
Twigworth	
Upton St Leonards	Absorbed Prinknash Park parish 1935
Westbury on Severn	Formerly an urban district, abolished 1935
Whaddon	Abolished 1935: split between Gloucester County Borough and Brookthorpe parish
Wheatenhurst: renamed Whitminster 1945	Transferred from abolished Wheatenhurst Rural District 1935.
Wotton St Mary Without	Abolished 1935, part to create Longlevens parish, part to Gloucester County Borough.
Wotton Vill	Absorbed by Gloucester County Borough 1951.

== Abolition ==
The rural district was abolished on 1 April 1974 under the Local Government Act 1972. Its territory was split between three new non-metropolitan districts: Tewkesbury (17 parishes), Stroud (16 parishes) and Forest of Dean (Newnham and Westbury-on-Severn parishes).
