= Tetbury Rural District =

Abolished District in England

Tetbury Rural District was a district in Gloucestershire. It was founded with the Local Government Act 1894 and was abolished in 1974 to create Cotswold District. Its records are held by the Gloucestershire Archives.

It included the parishes of Avening, Beverstone, Boxwell with Leighterton, Cherington, Didmarton (which, until parts of the parish of Hawkesbury were transferred under the County of Gloucester Review Order 1935 to the parish of Didmarton, was an exclave separated from the district's main area by Hawkesbury in Sodbury Rural District), Kingscote, Newington Bagpath, Ozleworth, Shipton Moyne, Tetbury Upton and Westonbirt.

After 1930 it also included the parishes of Ashley and Long Newnton which were transferred from Wiltshire under an adjustment of the Local Government Act 1929.

In 1935, it absorbed Tetbury Urban District Council, which had also been created by the 1894 Act, when this was dissolved under the County of Gloucester Review Order 1935. From 1966 it formed part of the Cotswold AONB.
