= Twigworth =

- Village
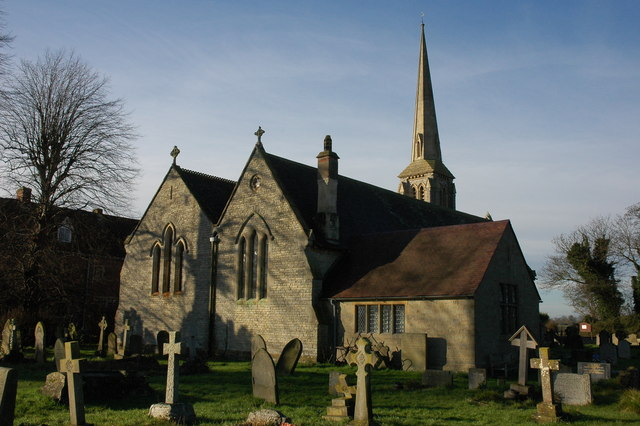
- St Matthew's Church, Twigworth

- Location of Twigworth in Gloucestershire
- Coordinates: 51.8984°N 2.2244°W
- Sovereign state: United Kingdom
- Constituent country: England
- Region: South West England
- Non-metropolitan county: Gloucestershire
- Status: Civil parish

Government
  - Body: Tewkesbury Borough

Population (2014)
  - Total: 340
- Time zone: UTC0 (GMT)
  - Summer (DST): UTC+1 (BST)
- Postcodes: GL1-GL4
- Area code: 01452
- Website: www.twigworthpc.co.uk

Twigworth is a small village near Gloucester in the Borough of Tewkesbury, Gloucestershire, England. The population of Twigworth Parish was 340 people in mid-2014 in 170 households. A housing development called "Twigworth Green" has been planned by three housing groups, Bloor Homes, Linden Homes and Bovis Homes, which includes a primary school and a secondary school.

The place name Twigworth is thought to derive from a personal name, Twicga, so an enclosure belonging to Twicga. The name was first recorded as Tuiggewrthe in 1216.

== Parish church ==
Twigworth parish church, consecrated in 1844, is dedicated to St Matthew.

The poet and composer Ivor Gurney is buried in the churchyard. Next to Gurney's grave is that of Michael Howells, son of the composer Herbert Howells, who died in 1935 of polio aged nine. Howells later wrote a hymn tune entitled Twigworth for the hymn "God is love, let heaven adore him", one of two hymn tunes he composed in memory of his son (the other being Michael — "All my hope on God is founded").

In 2019, following a decision by the Diocese of Gloucester, St Matthew's Church was closed for public worship and the ecclesiastical parish of Twigworth was dissolved and merged into the parish of Sandhurst.

St Matthew's Churchyard

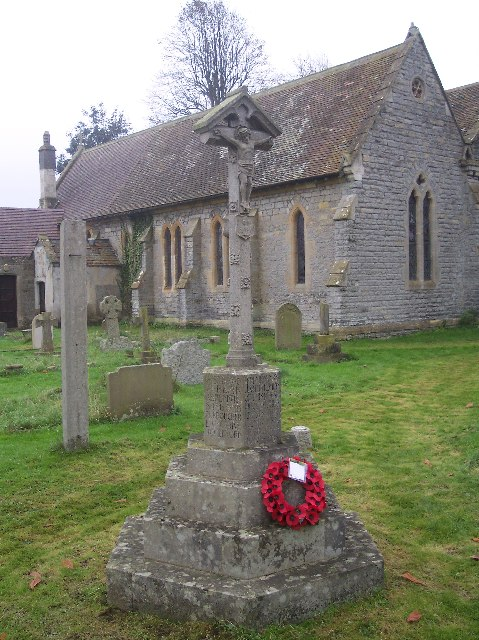
Twigworth War Memorial

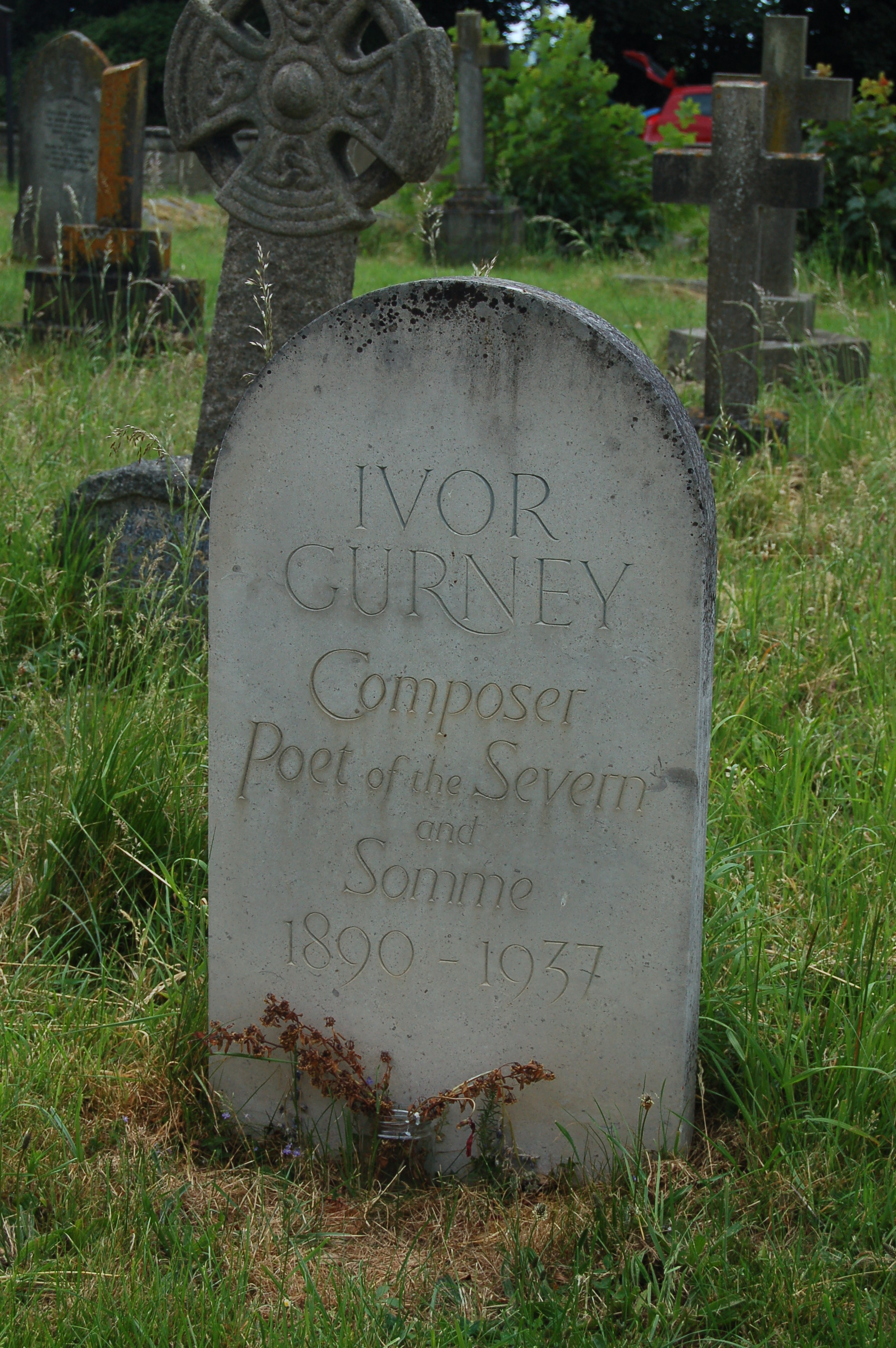
Grave of war poet and composer Ivor Gurney
