= Hunts Grove =

Village in Gloucestershire, England

Coordinates: 51.809°N 2.270°W

- Civil parish
- Location within the United Kingdom
- Area: 1.77 km^{2} (0.68 sq mi)
- Civil parish: Hunts Grove
- District: Stroud District
- Shire county: Gloucestershire
- Country: England
- Sovereign state: United Kingdom
- UK Parliament: North Cotswolds

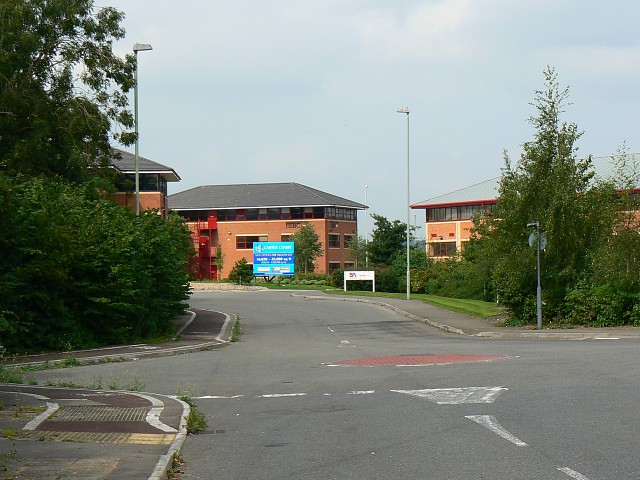

Hunts Grove is a civil parish on the southern edge of the city of Gloucester. It almost entirely comprises a new build development being built on land formerly part of Colethrop Farm, but also includes the older area of Four Mile Elm on the Bristol Road and Bath Road.

The development and the parish are named Hunts Grove after the small historic woodland on the site.

Building began in 2010 and is expected to continue into the 2030s.

On 1 April 2020, Hunts Grove became a parish in its own right having previously straddled the parishes of Hardwicke and Haresfield.

== Planning ==
Planning permission was granted in 2008 by Stroud District Council, the relevant planning authority. Gloucester City Council formally objected but a government planning inspector confirmed the permission in 2009. Further objections were raised when Stroud District Council proposed an extension to include a further 750 new homes.

On 25 May 2014, Gloucestershire County Council announced that a new primary school in the village would serve the 1,750 new homes being built.

== Phases and Developers ==
- PHASE 1 (Complete)
  - Crest Nicholson - Development name "Whitstone Hundred"
  - David Wilson Homes - Development name "Haresfield Chase"
- PHASE 2 (Complete)
  - Crest Nicholson - Development name "Hunts Grove Gate"
  - Crest Nicholson - Development name "The Ridings"
  - David Wilson Homes - Development name "Rosewood Grange"
  - Bellway Homes - Development name "Springfields"
- PHASE 3 (Complete)
  - Bovis Homes - Development name "Oaklands"
  - Linden Homes
- PHASE 4 (Under construction)
  - Crest Nicholson
  - Bellway - Development name "Blackthorn Walk"
- FARMHOUSE TRIANGLE (planned)
  - Colethrop Farm Limited (the original landowner)
- HUNTS GROVE EXTENSION (planned)
  - A further development of approx 700 homes is included in Stroud District Council's Local Plan and initial planning work is underway.

== Hunts Grove Primary Academy ==
Hunts Grove Primary Academy is operated by Robinswood Academy Trust and opened in September 2019. Construction of the school was contracted by Crest Nicholson to Willmott Dixon Construction Ltd with the build commencing September 3, 2018.
