= Barton Regis Hundred =

Former administrative division in Gloucestershire, England

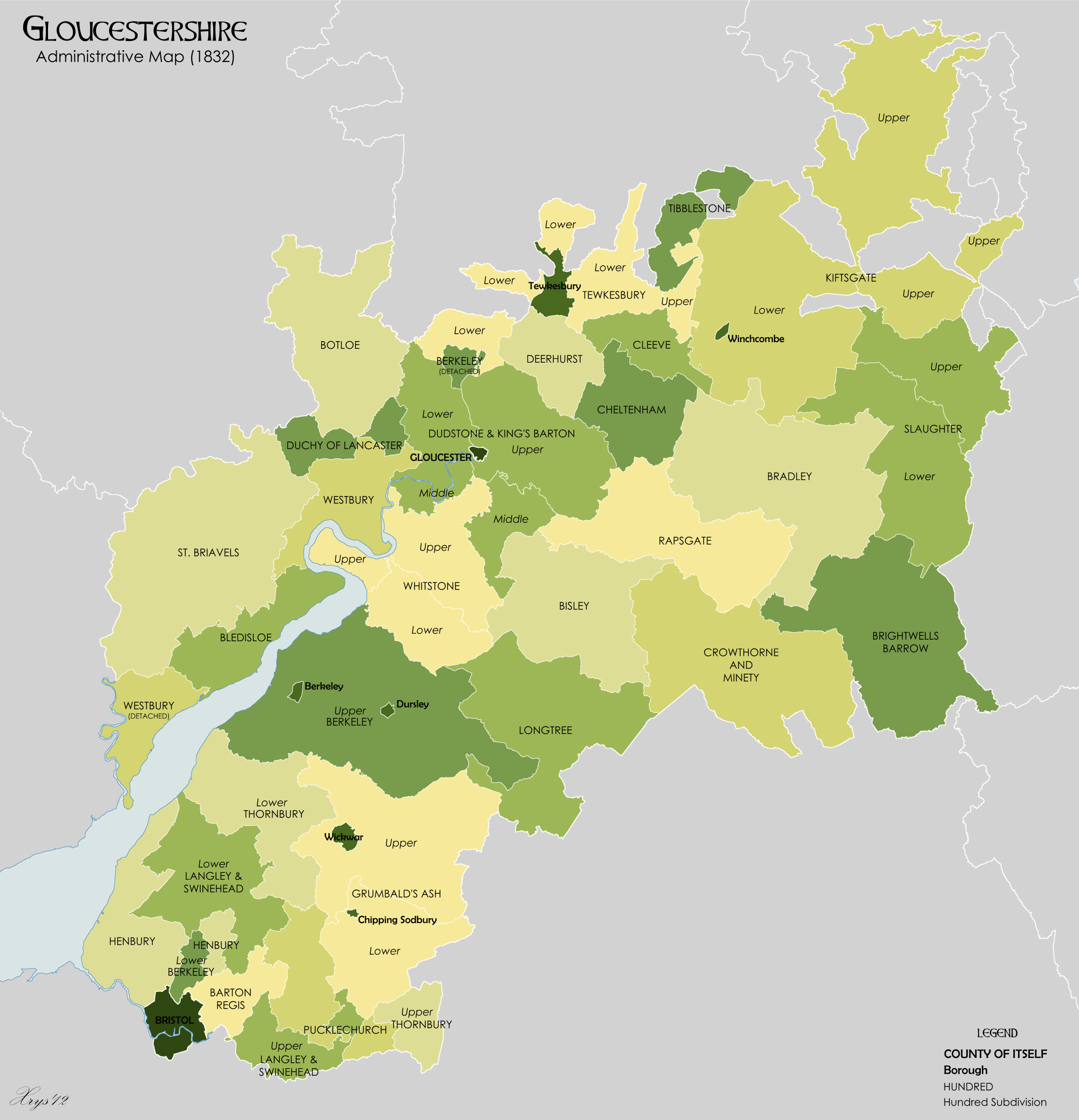
Gloucestershire Hundreds in 1832

Barton Regis was an ancient hundred of Gloucestershire, England. Hundreds originated in the late Saxon period as a subdivision of a county and lasted as administrative divisions until the 19th century.

It comprised the three ancient parishes of Clifton, Mangotsfield and Stapleton, all on the outskirts of the city of Bristol, plus the Bristol parishes of St George, St Philip & St Jacob and St James Out. The hundred took its name from the manor of Barton just outside Bristol, mentioned in the Domesday Book as Bertune apud Bristov, and later in 1220 as Berton Bristoll. In Saxon and early Norman times the manor was held by the king, and was known as Barton Regis. The name Barton itself is derived from the Old English bere-tun, signifying a barley farm or an enclosure for threshing corn. At the time of the Domesday Book, Barton Regis was part of the neighbouring hundred of Swineshead.

In local records dating from the 16th and 17th centuries, such as wills, the term Barton Regis was often used as a residence location. In this specific context, it typically referred to the area that later became the out-parish of St Philip and St Jacob. A portion of this area was used to form the new parish of St George in 1756.

In 1836 the hundred became the basis of a new Poor Law Union, which also included additional parishes north and west of Bristol. The Poor Law Union did not include Mangotsfield (part of Keynsham Union), or the central areas of Bristol (exempted from the 1836 poor law changes as an existing Incorporation). The Poor Law Union was initially named Clifton Union, but was changed in 1877 to Barton Regis Union, because the residents of Clifton objected to the poor mortality statistics associated with the name of Clifton resulting from the inclusion of poorer areas in east Bristol. The Registrar-General published quarterly mortality league tables, and the inclusion of these poorer parishes negatively impacted Clifton's reputation as a health resort and spa destination. In 1875, the parts of the Poor Law Union outside Bristol formed the basis of the Barton Regis rural sanitary district, which was replaced by Barton Regis Rural District in 1894. The rural district was abolished in 1904, when it was split between Bristol City Council, Chipping Sodbury RD and Thornbury RD.

In 1877 Clifton registration district, used for the registration of births, marriages and deaths, was replaced by Barton Regis Registration District. The Barton Regis Registration District included most of the area of the Barton Regis Poor Law Union, and therefore included Bristol north of the Avon, outside the central area. The district was abolished in 1905, when most of it became part of Bristol Registration District.

The name survives in the district of Barton Hill.
