= Malswick =

Coordinates: 51.9267°N 2.3809°W

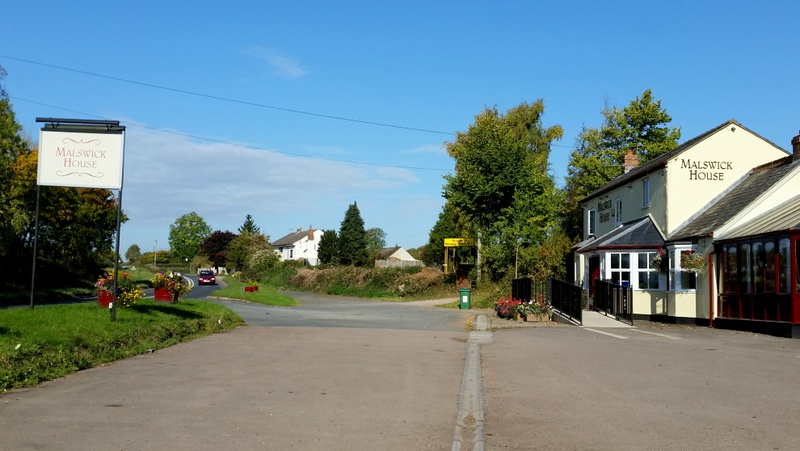
- Malswick House

- Location within Gloucestershire
- Civil parish: Newent
- District: Forest of Dean
- Shire county: Gloucestershire
- Region: South West
- Country: England
- Sovereign state: United Kingdom
- Police: Gloucestershire
- Fire: Gloucestershire
- Ambulance: South Western

Malswick is a village in the civil parish of Newent, in the Forest of Dean district, in the county of Gloucestershire, England. It contains the ground for the Newent FC.

The village formerly had a railway station, Malswick Halt, a request stop on the former Ledbury and Gloucester Railway.

In 2022, the Herefordshire and Gloucestershire Canal Trust began a project to restore the canals at the village.

In 1870-72 the tything had a population of 225.
