= Lydney Rural District =

Former local government area in the UK

Coordinates: 51.725°N 2.514°W

Lydney was a rural district in Gloucestershire, England from 1894 to 1974. It covered an area on the Welsh border by the Severn estuary.

It was formed under the Local Government Act 1894 from that part of the Chepstow rural sanitary district which was in Gloucestershire (and England), the rest forming Chepstow Rural District in Monmouthshire.

The district consisted of the following parishes :

- Alvington
- Aylburton
- Hewelsfield
- Lancaut
- Lydney
- St. Briavels
- Tidenham
- Woolaston

It survived until 1974, when it was merged with other districts to form the Forest of Dean district.
