= North Cotswold Rural District =

Former local government area in the UK

Coordinates: 51.989°N 1.703°W

North Cotswold
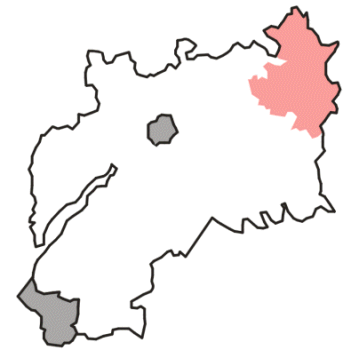
- Area
  - 1951: 86,203 acres (348.85 km^{2})
- Population
  - 1931: 15,761
  - 1971: 20,421
- History
  - Created: 1935
  - Abolished: 1974
  - Succeeded by: Cotswold
- Status: Rural district
- Government
  - HQ: Moreton-in-Marsh
  - Motto: Montes Excelsi Refugio

North Cotswold was, from 1935 to 1974, a rural district in the administrative county of Gloucestershire, England.

== Formation ==
Under the Local Government Act 1929 county councils were given the duty of reviewing the districts within their county. Gloucestershire contained a large number of very small urban and rural districts, and it was decided to reduce the number by amalgamation. This was carried out by The County of Gloucester Review Order 1935, which came into effect on 1 April 1935. North Cotswold Rural District was formed by the amalgamation of the whole or part of four districts:

- Campden Rural District (less 3 parishes transferred to Stratford-on-Avon Rural District, Warwickshire)
- Stow on the Wold Urban District
- Stow on the Wold Rural District (less 2 parishes to Northleach Rural District)
- Winchcombe Rural District (part only, most passed to Cheltenham Rural District)

== Parishes ==
The district consisted of the following parishes:

- Adlestrop
- Aston Subedge
- Batsford
- Bledington
- Blockley
- Bourton-on-the-Hill
- Bourton-on-the-Water
- Broadwell
- Chipping Campden
- Clapton
- Condicote
- Cutsdean
- Donnington
- Ebrington
- Evenlode
- Great Rissington
- Guiting Power
- Icomb
- Little Rissington
- Longborough
- Lower Slaughter
- Maugersbury
- Mickleton
- Moreton-in-Marsh
- Naunton
- Oddington
- Saintbury
- Sezincote
- Stow-on-the-Wold
- Swell
- Temple Guiting
- Todenham
- Upper Slaughter
- Westcote
- Weston Subedge
- Wick Rissington
- Willersey

== Coat of arms and motto ==
North Cotswold Rural District Council was granted armorial bearings by letters patent dated 9 September 1955. The grant consisted of arms and crest, which were blazoned as follows:

Vert a pallet argent over all a fleece Or ringed and banded gules on a chief enarched of the second two mitres also gules, and for a crest, out of a coronet composed of four fleurs-de-lys set upon a rim Or, a swan rousant proper gorged with a ducal coronet pendent therefrom an escutcheon gules charged with a sun gold.

The green field and "enarched" chief or top third of the shield represented the curve of a hill. The fleece was a symbol of the traditional woollen industry of the area. The Latin motto chosen by the council: Montes Excelsi Refugio or "the high hills for a refuge" was adapted from Psalm 104.

== Abolition ==
The district was abolished in 1974 under the Local Government Act 1972, which completely reorganised council boundaries throughout England and Wales. North Cotswold RD was merged with four neighbouring districts to form the non-metropolitan district of Cotswold, one of six districts in Gloucestershire.
