= Cherington, Gloucestershire =

Village in Gloucestershire, England

Coordinates: 51.6872°N 2.138°W

Cherington
- Location within Gloucestershire
- Population: 224 (2011)
- District: Cotswold
- Shire county: Gloucestershire
- Region: South West
- Country: England
- Sovereign state: United Kingdom
- Post town: Tetbury
- Postcode district: GL8
- Police: Gloucestershire
- Fire: Gloucestershire
- Ambulance: South Western
- UK Parliament: South Cotswolds
- Website: Cotswold Parish Council

Cherington is a village and civil parish in the Cotswold District of Gloucestershire, England. It lies about 3 miles (4.8 km) south east of Minchinhampton and about 4 miles (6.4 km) north of Tetbury. The population of the civil parish at the 2011 Census was 224.

== St Nicholas's Church ==
The Anglican parish church of St Nicholas is a Grade I listed building. It is part of the Avening with Cherington benefice.

The church was founded in the 12th century and had its chancel rebuilt in the mid-13th century. There were other later medieval alterations and two 19th-century restorations, one minor in 1816, and one major in 1881. Members of the British Royal Family have been christened at St Nicholas's Church, due to its close proximity to Princess Anne's Gatcombe Park Estate.

=== Architecture ===
The north doorway has a 12th-century tympanum above it.

== Cherington Park ==
Cherington Park is a Grade II listed building. Earliest records of a manor house in Cherington date back to 1074, when it was owned by Robert D’Oyly, Lord of Wallingford.

In 1740 this manor house was replaced with Cherington Park, as it stands today, by John Neale MP. Neale died in 1749 passing Cherington to his daughter Frances and her husband, Sir John Turner, 3rd Baronet MP. By 1766 Turner sold Cherington to Samuel Smith of Smith's Bank and brother of Abel Smith MP. Cherington was then passed on to Smith's son, Samuel Smith MP, a director of the East India Company and cousin of Robert Smith, 1st Baron Carrington. The estate was then sold by Smith’s widow, Mary, to John George. George added Coxes Farm and glebe land to the estate, passing it to his son, William, in 1824. William George inherited Westrip Farm and Hazleton Farm from his uncle, also William, in 1832. Over the course of the George family's ownership Cherington Park was greatly enlarged by the addition of three service ranges around a courtyard. William George left the Cherington Estate to his two grandchildren, Constance and Gertrude who, in 1934, sold it to Edward Tarlton, of Bird & Co. a jute, railroad and mining company, now Ministry of Steel India.
