= Tirley =

Village in Gloucestershire, England

Coordinates: 51.95°N 02.24°W

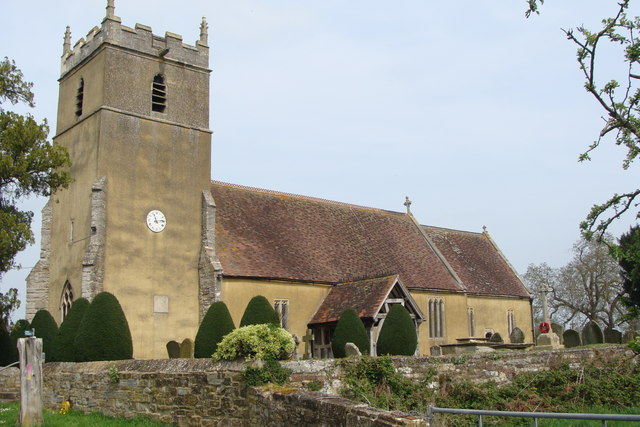
- Parish church of St Michael and All Angels

- Location within Gloucestershire
- Population: 428 (2011 census)
- District: Tewkesbury
- Shire county: Gloucestershire
- Region: South West
- Country: England
- Sovereign state: United Kingdom
- Post town: Gloucester
- Postcode district: GL19
- Dialling code: 01452
- Police: Gloucestershire
- Fire: Gloucestershire
- Ambulance: South Western
- UK Parliament: Forest of Dean

Tirley is a village and civil parish in Gloucestershire, England. It is located in the Borough of Tewkesbury district, 4 miles (6 km) south-west of Tewkesbury town and 6 miles (10 km) north of Gloucester. The village is situated on a low limestone ridge just above the flood plain of the River Severn. It is on the B4213 road, half a mile west of Haw Bridge, a crossing point on the Severn since the 13th century.

The parish population at the 2011 census was 428.

It has a parish church dedicated to St Michael and All Angels.
