= Newent Rural District =

Former rural district in Gloucestershire, England

Newent Rural District was a district in Gloucestershire, England. It was founded in 1894 and was abolished on 1 April 1974 to form the Forest of Dean non-metropolitan district.
