= Oxenhall =

Village in Gloucestershire, England

Coordinates: 51.938550°N 2.4215895°W

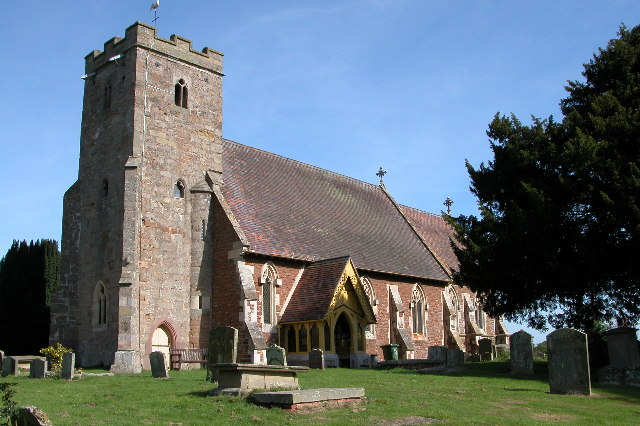

- Location within Gloucestershire
- Area: 9.084 km^{2} (3.507 sq mi)
- Population: 243 (2011 census)
  - Density: 27/km^{2} (70/sq mi)
- Civil parish: Oxenhall
- District: Forest of Dean
- Shire county: Gloucestershire
- Region: South West
- Country: England
- Sovereign state: United Kingdom
- Police: Gloucestershire
- Fire: Gloucestershire
- Ambulance: South Western

Oxenhall is a village and civil parish 10 miles (16 km) north west of Gloucester, in the Forest of Dean district, in the county of Gloucestershire, England. In 2011 the parish had a population of 243. The parish touches Dymock, Gorsley and Kilcot, Kempley, Newent and Upton Bishop. Oxenhall has a parish meeting.

== Landmarks ==
There are 18 listed buildings in Oxenhall. Oxenhall has a church called St Anne's Church and a parish hall.

== History ==
The name "Oxenhall" means 'Nook of land where oxen are kept'. Oxenhall was recorded in the Domesday Book as Horsenehal. On 25 March 1883 a detached part of Pauntley parish was transferred to Oxenhall.
