= Barton Regis Rural District =

Former local government area in the UK

Coordinates: 51.472°N 2.558°W

Barton Regis
- Population
  - 1891: 13,828
- History
  - Created: 1894
  - Abolished: 1904
- Status: Rural district
  - HQ: Eastville, Bristol

Barton Regis was, from 1894 to 1904, a rural district in the English administrative county of Gloucestershire, adjacent to the City of Bristol.

== Formation ==
The rural district was formed by the Local Government Act 1894 as successor to the Barton Regis Rural Sanitary District, which had taken its name from the ancient hundred of Barton Regis, albeit with quite different boundaries. A directly elected rural district council (RDC) replaced the rural sanitary authority consisting of the poor law guardians for the area. The RDC was based in the offices of the poor law guardians in the Eastville area of Bristol.

== Parishes ==
The rural district consisted of six civil parishes:

- Filton
- Henbury
- Shirehampton
- Stoke Gifford
- Westbury-on-Trym
- Winterbourne

== Abolition ==
In November 1903 Bristol Corporation promoted a local act of Parliament to extend the area of the city to include the parishes of Shirehampton and Westbury-on-Trym, and part of the parish of Henbury, as well as the neighbouring Horfield Urban District. As a consequence it was proposed to dissolve the Barton Regis Rural District and distribute its area between the Chipping Sodbury and Thornbury rural districts.

The Bristol Corporation Act 1904 (4 Edw. 7. c. ccxxiii) took effect on 1 October 1904. Shirehampton and Westbury-on-Trym were added to the city, Filton, Stoke Gifford and Winterbourne parishes were transferred to Chipping Sodbury Rural District, while the parish of Henbury was transferred to Thornbury Rural District.
