= Gorsley and Kilcot =

- Civil parish
- Interactive map of Gorsley and Kilcot
- Coordinates: 51°55′30″N 2°27′30″W
- Country: England
- Primary council: Forest of Dean
- County: Gloucestershire
- Region: South West England
- Status: Parish
- Main settlements: Kilcot, Gorsley

Government
  - Type: Parish Council
  - UK Parliament: Forest of Dean

Population (2011)
  - Total: 273

Gorsley and Kilcot is a civil parish forming part of the district of the Forest of Dean in the English county of Gloucestershire.

The single parish of Gorsley and Kilcot came into being in 2000; until then it had been part of Newent civil parish. The parish, which contained 166 households in 2011, borders on the county of Herefordshire and is bisected by the B4221 road.

Adjoining parishes are Oxenhall to the north; Newent to the east; Aston Ingham to the south; Linton to the west; and Upton Bishop to the north-west. Of these, Oxenhall and Newent are in the Forest of Dean district, the others are in Herefordshire.

The main settlements are Gorsley and the hamlet of Kilcot. The similarly named settlement of Little Gorsley is across the county border in Herefordshire.

Kilcot is the home of The Kilcot Inn. The name Kilcot has historically been given as Killicote (1283), Kyllicote, Kylcote (1281), Killecote, Kylcot, and Kulkotte (1307) It has been suggested that the name originates from "Cyllingcocotan" meaning the cots (dwellings) of the people of Cylla.
