= Stroud District =

Coordinates: 51.748°N 2.216°W

- Non-metropolitan district
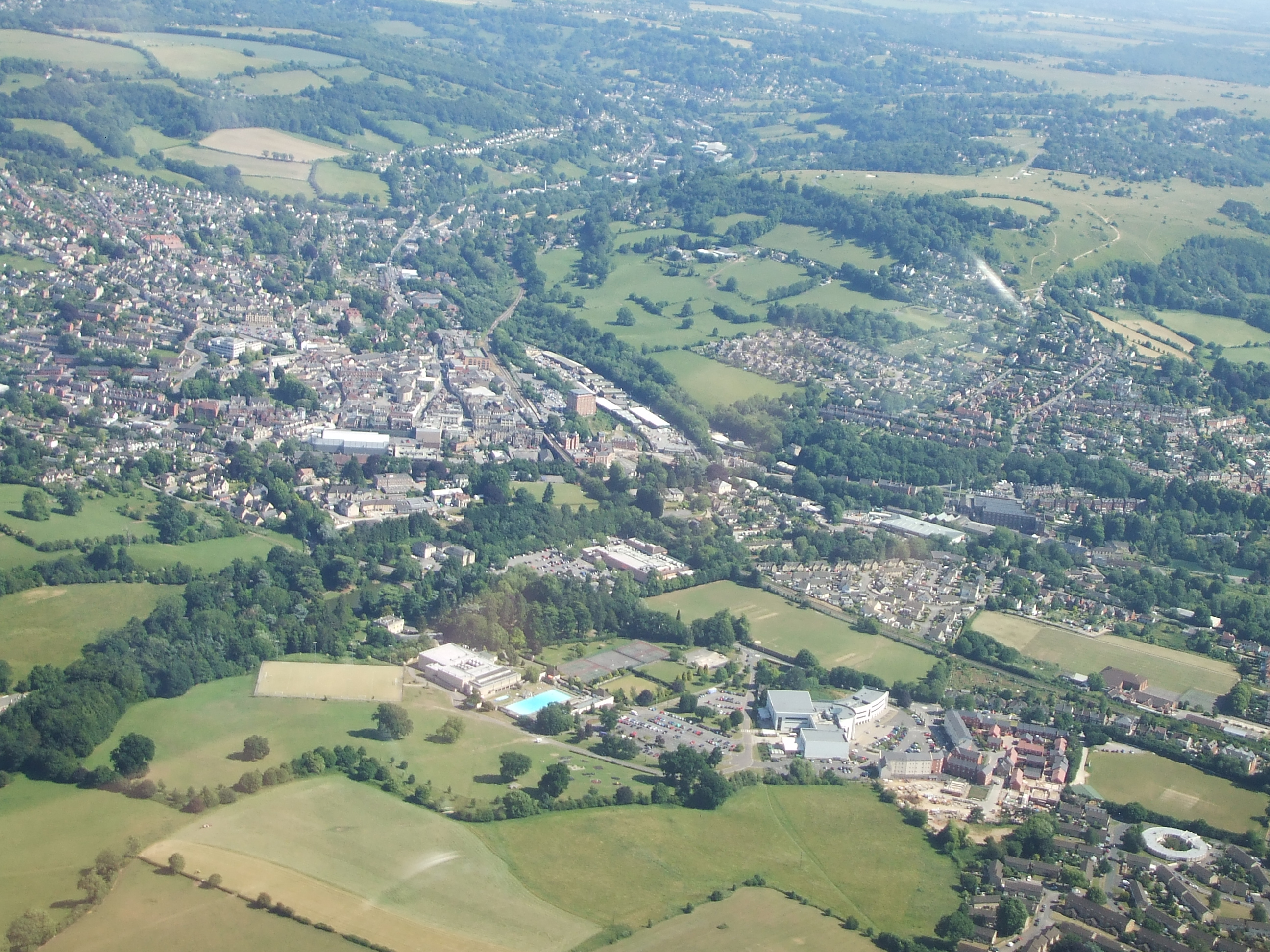
- Stroud from the air

- Stroud shown within Gloucestershire
- Sovereign state: United Kingdom
- Constituent country: England
- Region: South West England
- Non-metropolitan county: Gloucestershire
- Status: Non-metropolitan district
- Admin HQ: Ebley
- Incorporated: 1 April 1974

Government
  - Type: Non-metropolitan district council
  - Body: Stroud District Council
  - MPs: Simon Opher Stroud Constituency; Geoffrey Clifton-Brown North Cotswolds Constituency; Roz Savage South Cotswolds Constituency

Area
  - Total: 177.9 sq mi (460.7 km^{2})
  - Rank: 82nd (of 296)

Population (2025)
  - Total: 126,418
  - Rank: 196th (of 296)
  - Density: 710.7/sq mi (274.4/km^{2})

Ethnicity (2021)
  - Ethnic groups: List: 96.4% White; 1.8% Mixed; 1% Asian; 0.4% Black; 0.4% other

Religion (2021)
  - Religion: List: 47.5% Christianity; 44.1% no religion; 8.1% other; 0.3% Islam
- Time zone: UTC0 (GMT)
  - Summer (DST): UTC+1 (BST)
- ONS code: 23UF (ONS); E07000082 (GSS)
- OS grid reference: SO8508905550

Stroud District is a local government district in Gloucestershire, England, it is due to be abolished and replaced by a new countywide unitary council, which the government is minded to establish in April 2029. All future elections, including byelections, are expected to be cancelled from October 2027.

The district is named after its largest town of Stroud. The council is based at Ebley Mill in the parish of Cainscross, west of central Stroud. The district also includes the towns of Berkeley, Dursley, Nailsworth, Stonehouse and Wotton-under-Edge, along with numerous villages, including new neighbourhoods on the fringe of Gloucester Hardwicke, Hunts Grove and Coopers Edge. The latter straddles the boundary with Tewkesbury Borough. The three parishes covering this neighbourhood are seeking the establishment of a single parish to cover the neighbourhood.

Over half of the district lies within the Cotswolds Area of Outstanding Natural Beauty. A large swathe of district is within the Severn tidal flood plain.

The neighbouring districts are Forest of Dean, Tewkesbury, Gloucester, Cotswold and South Gloucestershire.

== History ==
The area is rich in Iron Age and Roman remnants and is of particular interest to archaeologists for its Neolithic burial grounds, of which there are over a hundred. Much of its wealth was built on the cloth industry, and its many mills, most of which are now listed buildings, survive as testament to this. Much of the landscape in this area is designated as an Area of Outstanding Natural Beauty. The Cotswold Way walk leads through the area. There are gliding clubs at Aston Down and Nympsfield.

The district was formed on 1 April 1974 under the Local Government Act 1972. It covered the whole area of four former districts and parts of another three, which were all abolished at the same time:

- Dursley Rural District
- Gloucester Rural District (part, rest split between Forest of Dean and Tewkesbury)
- Nailsworth Urban District
- Sodbury Rural District (parish of Alderley only, rest went to Northavon)
- Stroud Rural District
- Stroud Urban District
- Thornbury Rural District (parishes of Alkington, Berkeley, Ham and Stone, Hamfallow and Hinton only, rest went to Northavon)

The new district was named Stroud after its largest town.

Boundary reviews in 1991 saw the district gain the parish of Hillesley and Tresham from Northavon and cede the parish of Quedgeley to Gloucester.

Under current local government reorganisation plans, the council will be abolished from 2028, with a single council for all of the current Gloucestershire County Council area. That decision was withdrawn in October 2026, when the government said it was minded to establish the single council with elections in May 2028 and vesting in April 2029.

== Governance ==
Stroud District Council

Type
- Type: Non-metropolitan district

Leadership
- Chair: Kate Kay, Green since 23 May 2024
- Leader: Chloe Turner, Green since 22 May 2025
- Chief Executive: Kathy O'Leary since November 2018

Structure
- Seats: 51 councillors
- Graph of the party split among 51 seats.
- Political groups: Administration (24) Green (24) Other parties (27) Labour (17) Conservative (6) Liberal Democrats (2) Independent (2)

Elections
- Voting system: First past the post
- Last election: 2 May 2024

Meeting place
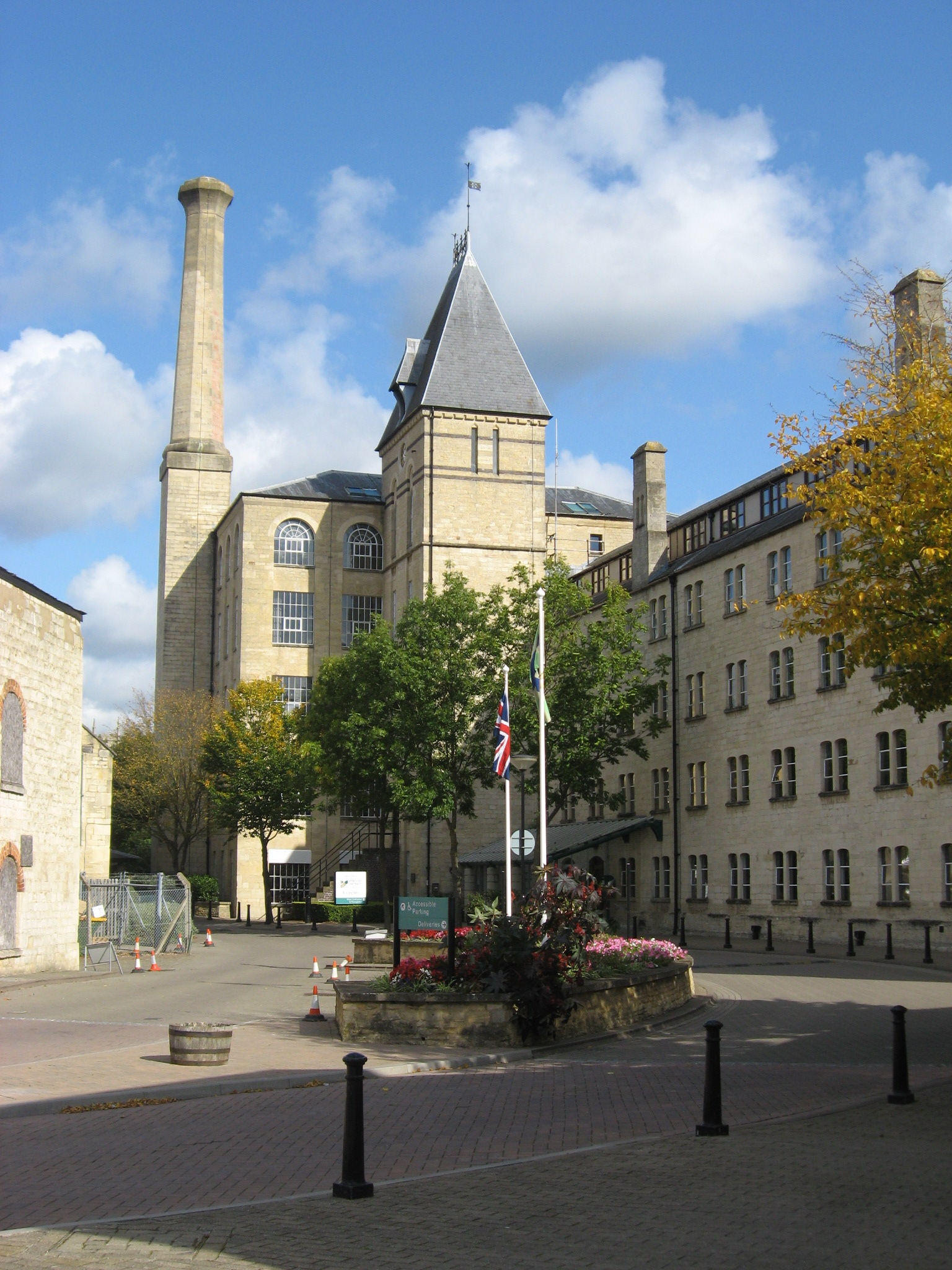
- Ebley Mill, Ebley Wharf, Stroud, GL5 4UB

Website
- www.stroud.gov.uk

Stroud District Council provides district-level services. County-level services are provided by Gloucestershire County Council. The whole district is also covered by civil parishes, which form neighbourhood and community governance.

=== Political control ===
The council has been under no overall control since 2011 and operates under the committee system (rather than the Leader and Cabinet model). Following the 2024 election a Green minority administration continues to run the council.

The first election to the council was held in 1973, initially operating as a shadow authority alongside the outgoing authorities until the new arrangements took effect on 1 April 1974. Political control of the council since 1974 has been as follows:

Party in control	Years
No overall control	1974–1976
Conservative	1976–1984
No overall control	1984–1996
Labour	1996–1998
No overall control	1998–2002
Conservative	2002–2011
No overall control	2011–present

=== Leadership ===
The leaders of the council since 2001 have been:

Councillor	Party	From	To
John Stephenson-Oliver	Conservative	10 May 2001	29 Jul 2004
Chas Fellows	Conservative	29 Jul 2004	12 Nov 2009
Frances Roden	Conservative	12 Nov 2009	17 May 2012
Geoff Wheeler	Labour	17 May 2012	May 2016
Steve Lydon	Labour	19 May 2016	Jan 2018
Doina Cornell	Labour	25 Jan 2018	30 Jun 2022
Doina Cornell	Independent	30 Jun 2022	21 Jul 2022
Catherine Braun	Green	21 Jul 2022	22 May 2025
Chloe Turner	Green	22 May 2025	

=== Composition ===
Following the 2024 election, and subsequent by-elections and changes of allegiance up to June 2026 the composition of the council was:

Party	Councillors
Green	24
Labour	17
Conservative	6
Liberal Democrats	2
Independent	2
Total	51

=== Premises ===
The council is based at Ebley Mill in the parish of Cainscross, a suburban town adjoining the west side of the town of Stroud. The mill was built as a woollen mill in 1818 and is a grade II* listed building. It was converted to become the council's offices between 1987 and 1990.

== Elections ==
Since the last full review of boundaries in 2016 the council has comprised 51 councillors representing 27 wards, with each ward electing one, two or three councillors. Elections are held every four years.

== Towns and parishes ==
The district is covered by 54 civil parishes with no unparished areas. The councils for Berkeley, Cainscross, Dursley, Nailsworth, Stonehouse, Stroud and Wotton-under-Edge take the style "town council". 45 have the status of parish, with none styled as village or neighbourhood councils.

Two of the smaller parishes, Alderley and Owlpen have a parish meeting rather than a parish council.

Wotton Under Edge is a former charter town, granted in 1252, but the municipal corporation was abolished in 1886.

Nailsworth and Stroud prior to 1974 were urban districts, although Stroud covered the town, Cainscross and the urban part of Rodborough as a result of a 1936 boundary change.

== Notable Members of Stroud District Council (and predecessors) ==
Margaret Hills (née Robertson) was the first woman elected to Stroud Urban District Council in 1928. where she stood as a representative of the Stroud Women's Citizens Association (SWCA). She remained a member until 1936 when the council was expanded to cover Cainscross and Rodborough.

David Drew is also a former member of the council originally representing the Stonehouse ward, then Paganhill and Farmhill ward and most recently Stroud Central ward. Tom Levitt is also a former member and served for a short time before moving to High Peak in the early 1990s.
