= Tetbury Upton =

Village in Gloucestershire, England

Coordinates: 51.654°N 2.172°W

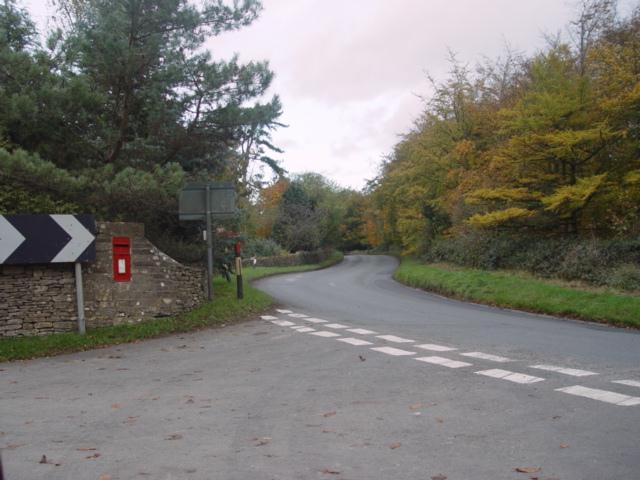

- Location within Gloucestershire
- Population: 309 (2011 Census)
- OS grid reference: ST880950
- Civil parish: Tetbury Upton
- District: Cotswold
- Shire county: Gloucestershire
- Region: South West
- Country: England
- Sovereign state: United Kingdom
- Post town: TETBURY
- Postcode district: GL8
- Dialling code: 01666
- Police: Gloucestershire
- Fire: Gloucestershire
- Ambulance: South Western
- UK Parliament: South Cotswolds

Tetbury Upton is a small village and civil parish in the Cotswolds area of Gloucestershire, England. The parish extends in an arc around the north, west, and south of the town of Tetbury, and includes the village of Tetbury Upton on the B4014 road 1.5 miles (2 km) north of the town and the village of Doughton on the A433 road 1.2 miles (1.9 km) southwest of the town. Upton and Doughton were historically things in the ancient parish of Tetbury, and the area became a separate civil parish in 1894. By 1901 Tetbury Upton's total population reached 905, but by 2011 the population had declined to 309.

Upton House is a Neoclassical country house built in 1752, whose design is usually attributed to William Halfpenny, of Bristol. The parish also includes Highgrove House near Doughton.

Despite its small size, the parish is the most populous in 'Grumbolds Ash' electoral ward. This ward starts in the south west at Didmarton passes Tetbury Upton, and ends in the north west at Kingscote. The total ward population taken at the 2011 census was 1,887.
