= Warmley Rural District =

District in Gloucestershire, England

Warmley Rural District was a district in Gloucestershire, England, named for the village of Warmley. It was created in 1894 and was dissolved in 1974 to form Kingswood. In 1996 the area became part of South Gloucestershire.
