= Stroud Rural District =

Abolished District in England

Stroud Rural District was a district in Gloucestershire. It was founded in 1894 and abolished in 1974 to form the Stroud District.
