= Aylburton =

Village in Gloucestershire, England

Coordinates: 51.71271°N 2.55574°W

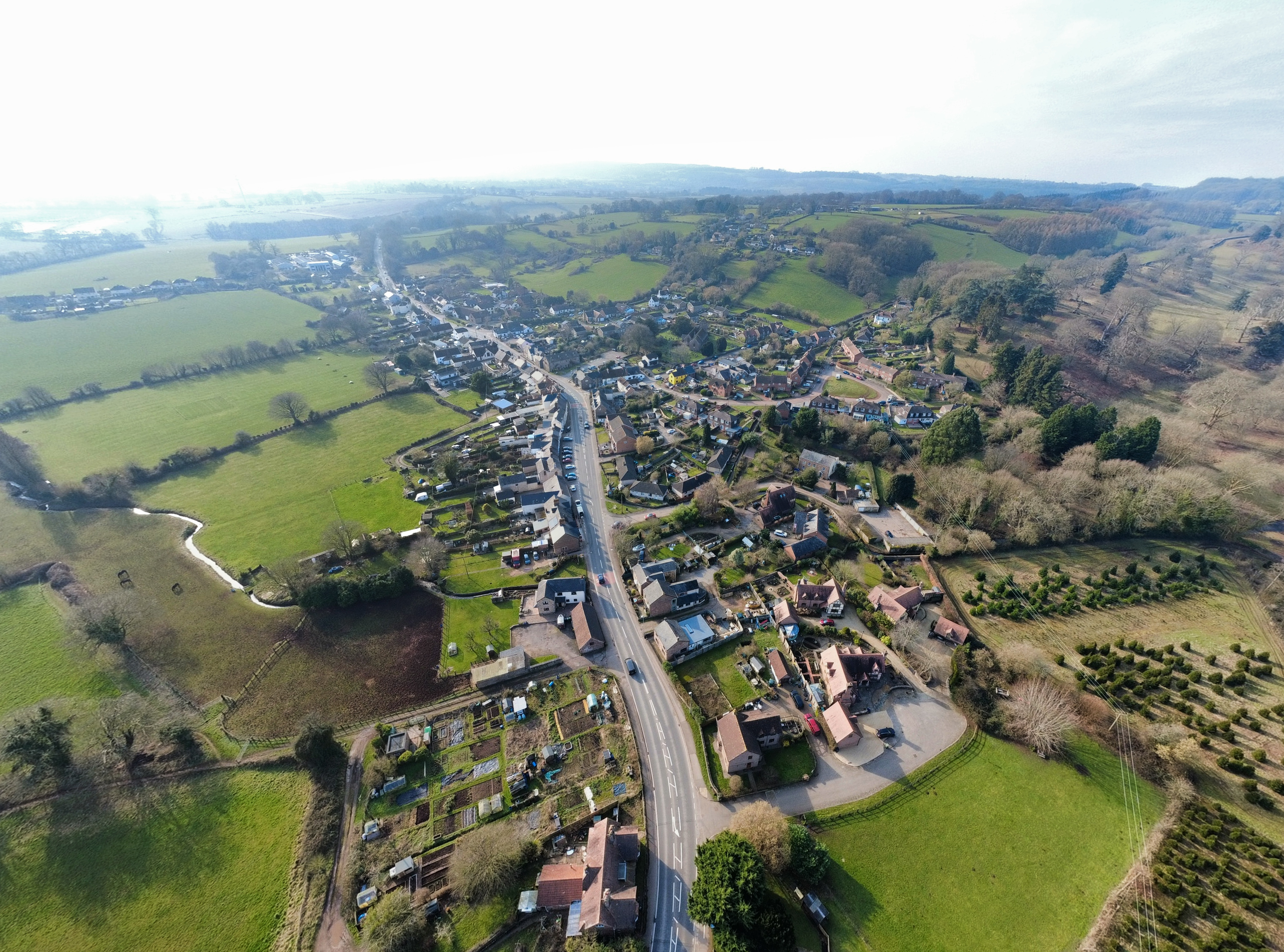
- Aylburton, looking west-southwest.

- Location within Gloucestershire
- OS grid reference: SO617017
- Civil parish: Aylburton
- District: Forest of Dean
- Shire county: Gloucestershire
- Region: South West
- Country: England
- Sovereign state: United Kingdom
- Post town: Lydney
- Postcode district: GL15
- Dialling code: 01594
- Police: Gloucestershire
- Fire: Gloucestershire
- Ambulance: South Western
- UK Parliament: Forest of Dean

Aylburton is a village and civil parish in the Forest of Dean district of Gloucestershire, England, on the A48 road about two miles south-west of Lydney. According to the 2001 census it had a population of 689, increasing to 711 at the 2011 census.

The centre of the Village is a Conservation area. There are elements of medieval buildings in The Cross, and a Cruck frame hall was later converted to a terrace of cottages.

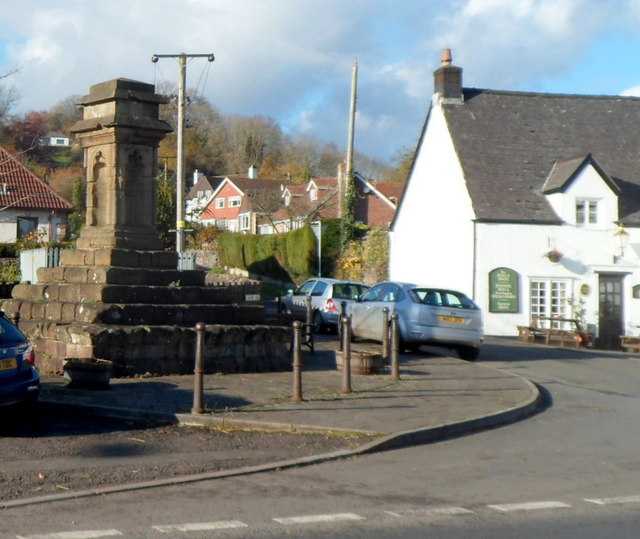
Aylburton Cross

== History of Aylburton ==
Aylburton lies on the line of the old Roman and medieval road. Limited archaeological excavations during permitted developments and the signs of garden soil improvement (compared to neighbouring fields, including the playing field) show long standing occupation.

During the Roman period most of the slopes of the parish were originally covered in woodland and the bank of the River Severn was more than 1 km closer to the main road, with around half of the current "levels" being reclaimed before about 450 AD. The area would have been dominated by the Roman villa and temple in the grounds behind what is now the Lydney Park House. At this time the Forest (of Dean) was just inside the territory known as Britannia Secunda (Secondary Britain), which covered Wales and whose eastern border was the River Severn. Thereafter, the Forest varied between Welsh and English possession at least until King Offa (8th C) built his famous dyke; at that point all of Gloucestershire came within England (n.b. the Dyke is fairly permeable this far South).

The land on which Aylburton (originally Æþelbeorhtes-tun or Ethelbert's farmstead) stands became part of a single manor of Lydney under the Earl of Hereford, William FitzOsbern (the builder of Chepstow Castle and founder of Lire Abbey in Normandy) in 1066, who then gifted it to Lire Abbey. Llanthony Priory became lord of both Aylburton and Alvington (but not Lydney) manors in 1277. They took iron and coal from the land above the current village and carried it down Darken Lane and Stockwell Lane to Aylburton Warth, where it was put onto ships. This carried on a tradition probably started by the Romans.

By 1219 Aylburton had its own chapel situated on Chapel Hill attributed to St. John (it became St. Mary's sometime before 1750). In the same year, Lire Abbey granted Lydney church to the dean and chapter of Hereford. Following the dissolution of the monasteries under Henry VIII, William Wyntour purchased the manor from the Crown in 1599. It remained in Wyntour hands (apart from a period covering the "Commonwealth") until purchased by the Bathurst family in 1723.

The Prior's Mesne estate (including outlying lands at Newlands and St. Briavels) was based at Prior's Lodge (also known as Prior's Mesne Lodge or Bream Lodge.) It was cleared of trees by Llanthony Priory in 1306 and largely converted to agricultural land, and they allowed their tenants rights of common there. Prior's Pool was a fishpond dating from this time. The market cross was built in the 14th C. Llanthony Priory had a fulling mill on Ferneyley Brook in 1535 (later called Tucker's Mill or Wood Mill, later to be used as a grist mill until around 1900).

Tudor Britain

By 1600, Aylburton manor had a mill at Millend (now Milling Green) on Park Brook. Housing was built around this time at Stockwell Lane and Millend. By 1608 there were 14 tradesmen in Aylburton, including a nailer, a parchment-maker, and a tucker (as in Tucker's Mill.) Aylburton Pill (Warth) was still used for shipping in 1608. There was much fishing in the Severn, with the Wyntour estate being granted the right to catch royal fish in 1640. By the mid 17th C, a new park had been formed to the SE of the original one, and was used mainly for raising deer. Parts of a small medieval hall are still visible at No. 32 High Street.

Stuart Britain

The building which now houses the Cross Inn was built in the 17th C, although there are wall elements from the 11th C. Old Court House was also a smallholding of similar age. Cross Farm incorporated part of an early house too. The short row of cottages at the bottom of Church Road are also probably 17th C. A hamlet called Overstreet once existed on the main road, roughly where Taurus Crafts now is. Sir Charles Wyntour built his new manor house there in 1692, the hamlet becoming tenancies and outbuildings thereof. The poor and needy were not forgotten, in 1680, Christopher Willoughby set up a trust so that £16 could be distributed annually among the poor of Aylburton, a practice which continues to this day.

By 1710, the north western part of the Parish boundary had been resolved into its current form. The boundary had followed what was called the Forest Ditch (probably Collier's brook), but can now be seen to follow the huge walls just to the south of Aylburton Lodge, built to finalise the, often bitter, boundary dispute that had existed between Aylburton and Alvington since Llanthony Priory lost ownership.

Georgian Britain

In 1717 there was an anvil works at the mill in Millend, but this had been replaced by a grist mill by 1759. Lodge Farm was established before 1717 by the Lydney estate. Prior's (Mesne) Lodge was built around the same time. In 1718, Wyntour's manor included (in Aylburton) 16 leasehold farms, ranging in size from 7-64 acres, which were almost entirely based on a number of smallholdings on the high street between Stockwell Lane and Millend, but then lands were sold off by the Wyntours to pay mounting debts left from repurchasing the estate, including the bulk of their tenant land in Aylburton, which was sold to John Lawes. He did not last long as the Bathurst family bought the estate in 1723. They moved the road slightly to the SE away from the then site of the main house.

In 1778, the lessee of the ironworks was given the right to work quarries at Aylburton Common. In 1784, Aylburton ratepayers resisted attempts by Lydney church to levy church rates on them, and this was the beginning of their becoming their own parish.

"The Hare and Hounds" inn opened in 1796 at the NE end of the village. Rockwood (at Heavens Gate) was built ca.1815 during the Regency period. By 1818 many of the smallholdings had merged into larger farms. These included: Home Farm (later Park Farm), Cross Farm (at Aylburton Cross), Redhill Farm. The New Grounds was still separate then, but was later added to Dairy Farm (on Church Road, Lydney). At the same time a few houses had been built on the Common (now Upper Common.) In 1818 the A48 was again moved to its present route S of Park Farm, which was built around the same time.

Victorian Britain

In the 1830s, the coney (rabbit) warren on Prior's Mesne estate was sold and houses (including the Warren) were built there. At about this time four almshouses were built alongside the Cross Inn. These were later regarded as church property, the occupants being chosen by the vestry. There was a church Sunday school in Aylburton chapel from 1847.

The railway line (owned by the South Wales Railway until 1863 and then GWR) was built in 1851. By 1851 there were 60 tradesmen in Aylburton (not including tinplate and iron-workers of whom there were many) including two solicitors and a doctor. Most employment was by now tinplate and iron-workers, as well as some miners and quarrymen.

In 1856, the medieval chapel was taken down and reconstructed on its present site, the cost being borne by Charles Bathurst. At this time, several windows were replaced, and the present graveyard created. Aylburton Lodge (then Devonshire Villa, on the Alvington/Bream Road) was built in 1858, demolishing a house built there in 1843.

An act of parliament in 1864 forced the enclosure of the common lands of Aylburton Common, Stockwell Green, the Bitterns, Lydney Mead, Aylburton Mead, Rodmore Mead, and Aylburton Warth (then Cow Pastures.) 278 acres were awarded to Rev. W.H. Bathurst, and 45 acres of Prior's Mesne common land went to James Croome. A few more houses were built on Upper Common after the enclosure in 1864, and the New Road was created sometime thereafter. Other houses were built at the same time on Lower Common, including the Traveller's Rest (or Besom, opened by 1880, closed late 1980s.) In 1866, there was a weir for fishing, with 650 putchers, at Aylburton Warth.

Aylburton C. of E. School opened in 1870 in a schoolhouse built opposite Aylburton chapel, mainly at the expense of Rev. W.H. Bathurst. In 1885, it was a mixed school with on average 96 pupils (it had a capacity of 160.) "The George" and "The Cross" were both open as pubs by 1870. The Cottage Hospital was opened in Aylburton in 1882 by Mary Bathurst.

In 1877, the current Lydney Park manor was built. The original was then demolished in 1883. During the 19th C, most farmland was consolidated into two or three large farms, the population becoming largely tradesmen and tinplate workers. At this time, the row of cottages from opposite Church Road to the Park Brook was built. Between 1890 and 1910, pairs of stone cottages were built further along the road by the Park estate.

In 1894 the parish council of Aylburton was created, the Playing Field coming into use in 1898, including vehicle access for matches and events. By 1903, the assistant curate of Lydney church was based at Aylburton at the request of the villagers and Charles Bathurst. Sandford Terrace was built in 1907 and a year later the Cottage Hospital was moved to the present site of Lydney Hospital. By 1910, Aylburton School had a separate infants department. Parts of Aylburton were supplied with water from before 1912 from a spring above the village, and this supply remains working today for approximately 80 houses (Aylburton Water Committee) operated by a co-operative.

In 1910, Wesleyan Methodists held open-air meetings at the Cross. A temporary building was later used, until 1915 when the Methodist chapel was built. In 1919 the "Butchers Arms" pub behind the Methodist Chapel was closed and used as a caretaker's cottage. The Village Hall was built in 1920-1 as a memorial to the fallen of World War I. Electricity was supplied to Lydney from 1925.

The building now used by the Millingbrook Hotel was a "Roller Skating Rink" in the early 20th Century.

Modern Britain

In 1936–8, Lydney Rural District built council houses on Stockwell Lane and in 1944, the almshouses were sold and demolished. In 1949, Aylburton School became state controlled and in 1950–1, Lydney Rural District Council built Milling Crescent. Mains water did not reach Aylburton until the 1950s. A reservoir was built near Lodge Farm, but was replaced by the one on Chapel Hill in 1956. "The Hare and Hounds" inn was demolished in the mid 20th C. The coal tips and their railways were finally closed in 1960. In 1974, Lydney Rural District became part of the new Forest of Dean District.

High Street still clearly shows many converted shopfronts which have gradually become purely residential during the 20th Century.

The derogatory nickname "Ducktown" is thought to be applied to Aylburton by outside elements (Lydney Football Team?) due to the former streams which ran alongside High Street (before culverts were built) leading to there being a highly visible duck population.

The Parish Newsletter is now the "Ducktown Echo".

Tolkien in Aylburton

During the late 1920s Lydney Park was excavated by Mortimer Wheeler. Local rumour had it that little folk, possibly Pwca, lived in the old mine workings that dot the area. J. R. R. Tolkien came to visit the site. He spent time in the Cross and supposedly modelled the Prancing Pony in Bree on it. He may also have used the Pwca in developing the Hobbits.

== Society and Amenities ==
The village lies at the edge of the Forest of Dean, and many workers historically worked at Lydney Docks and the Tinplate works. There is a strong agricultural influence in the village today, although historically this would have been more evident and many of the population now work outside of the village and its immediate surroundings.

Aylburton Church of England School is thriving.

The Memorial Hall is a centre piece of the village. The Annual Carnival on the second Saturday in July closes the A48 between 1400 and 1500 much to the enjoyment of local residents (it was suspended in 2020 due to COVID-19). The Fruit and Veg Show on the Saturday of the August Bank Holiday is a keen struggle between local notables.

Aylburton has two successful pubs, The Cross and The George.

Local activities can be found here

St. Mary's Church is of 14th Century origin and originally stood on nearby Chapel Hill - a position of prominence. At that stage, in the 15th Century, it was dedicated to St. John the Baptist. Its site proved to be neither sheltered nor convenient for parishioners and the building fell into a poor state of repair. To overcome all these problems, it was moved stone by stone and rebuilt in its current location - centrally in the village - in 1855–56. The rebuilding was paid for by Charles Bathurst. There is a low tower at the West end with a pyramid roof. The font and pulpit date from the 15th Century, with the latter being one of only sixty left in England today.

The tiny Mission church at Aylburton Common was built in 1867 and underwent repairs and restoration in 1951. The church to this day has great rustic charm and is still in regular use.

Aylburton Methodist Church is situated on the High Street and is currently undergoing extensive modernisation. It remains open.

== Transport ==
Aylburton lies on the A48 road, which runs from Chepstow in Monmouthshire, Wales, to Gloucester, England. The road is detrunked, but still used as a major route. It does suffer from water running down from the Common and disrupting traffic during heavy rain. There is no pedestrian crossing in the Village. The nearest railway station is Lydney which is a longish walk, or muddy by lanes.

== Politics ==
Aylburton is represented by the county councillor for Lydney division and the two district councillors for Alvington, Aylburton and West Lydney ward in the Forest of Dean District Council. The Forest of Dean is represented in Parliament by Mark Harper MP (Conservative Party).

There has recently been active debate in the village on wind turbines in the neighbouring village of Alvington which would have little impact on Aylburton residents.

== Sport ==
Aylburton Rovers FC traditionally played on the Memorial Field but are now resting. Bream AFC have also played here. Forest Exiles Cricket Club have been based at the Memorial Field since 2016.

Aylburton Cricket Club plays one match per year against Primrose Hill.
