= Cirencester Rural District =

Abolished district in England

Cirencester Rural District was a rural district based around Cirencester in Gloucestershire. It was created in 1894 and abolished in 1974 after merging with other districts to form the Cotswold District.
