= Thornbury Rural District =

Former local government area in the UK

Coordinates: 51.608°N 2.528°W

Thornbury Rural District was a rural district council centred on Thornbury in the south of Gloucestershire. It was originally formed as a Poor Law Union on 5 April 1836 with 26 Guardians representing the 21 parishes in the Union and the Guardians of the Poor became the Rural Sanitary Authority for the District in 1872. The Rural District Council became a separate body in 1894 although the District Councillors had a dual mandate as members of both the council and the Board of Guardians.The District was enlarged in 1904 when Henbury was transferred from the abolished Barton Regis Rural District. In 1930 the Guardians were abolished when their functions were transferred to the Rural District Council. The arms of the Council featured a "Thorn-berry" tree for Thornbury and a pair of gold wings for the important aircraft industry at Filton and Patchway. It was abolished in 1974 and the majority of it transferred into the new county of Avon, as part of the new district of Northavon.

However a group of parishes in the north of the district, around Berkeley, wished not to transfer into the new county, but chose instead to remain with Gloucestershire, under the new Stroud District Council. These were the parishes of Hinton, Hamfallow, Ham and Stone, Alkington, and Berkeley itself, and all except Stone were part of the ancient ecclesiastical parish of Berkeley.

With the demise of Avon, in 1996, the 'Berkeley parishes' were not re-united with the Thornbury area in the new unitary authority of South Gloucestershire, but remained with the main county of Gloucestershire.

== Records of the RDC ==
The records of Thornbury RDC between 1872 and 1974 are held at Gloucestershire Archives in Gloucester, ref. DA38. A copy of the list may be seen at the National Archives in London, ref. NRA 37079 Thornbury RDC.
