= Borough of Tewkesbury =

Coordinates: 52°0′0″N 2°10′0″W

Tewkesbury Borough
- Non-metropolitan district and borough
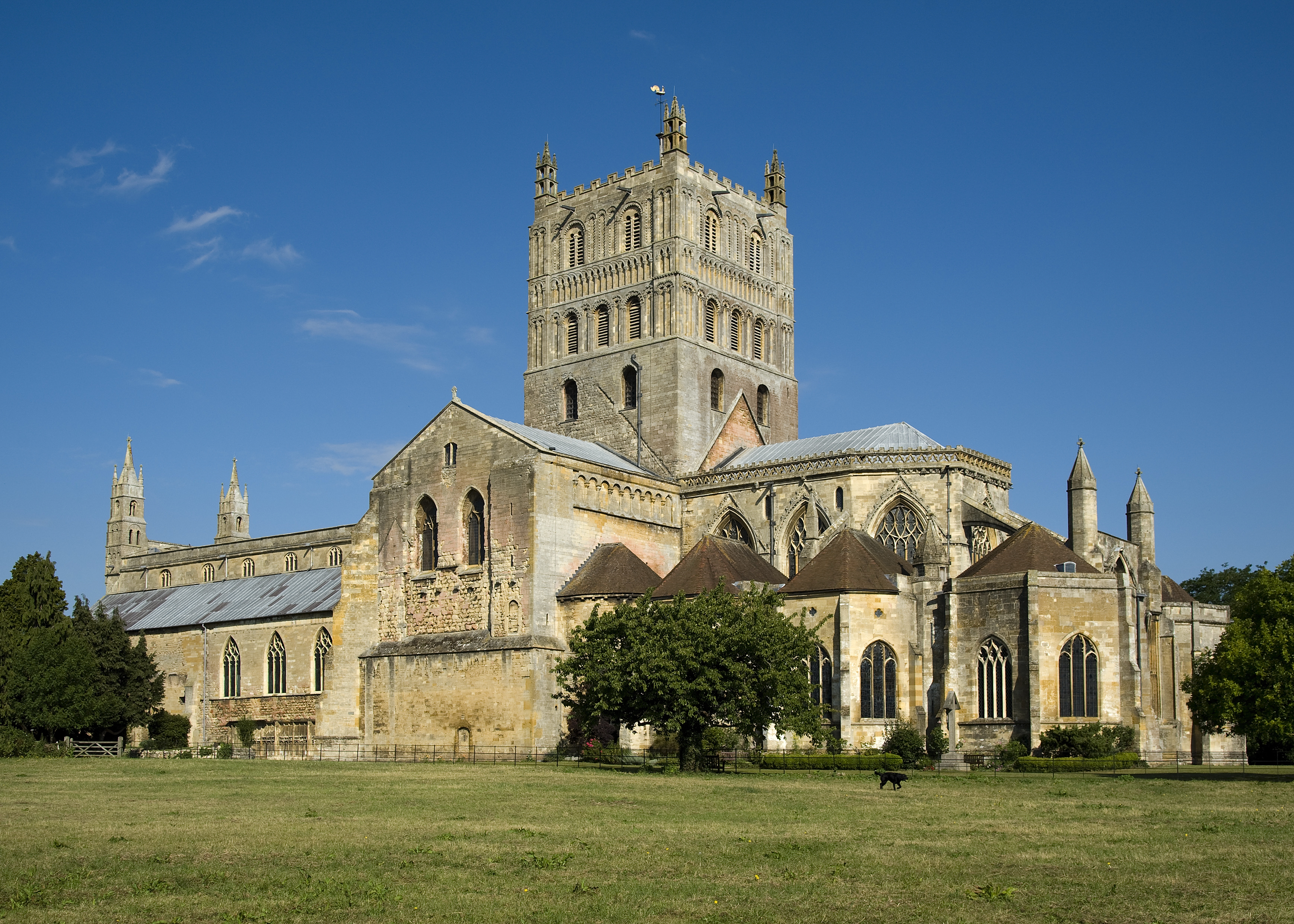
- Tewkesbury Abbey in the town of Tewkesbury which the district is named after and governed from

- Tewkesbury shown within Gloucestershire
- Sovereign state: United Kingdom
- Constituent country: England
- Region: South West England
- Non-metropolitan county: Gloucestershire
- Status: Non-metropolitan district
- Admin HQ: Tewkesbury
- Incorporated: 1 April 1974

Government
  - Type: Non-metropolitan district council
  - Body: Tewkesbury Borough Council
  - MPs: Matt Bishop; Geoffrey Clifton-Brown; Cameron Thomas

Area
  - Total: 160.0 sq mi (414.4 km^{2})
  - Rank: 83rd (of 296)

Population (2025)
  - Total: 103,753
  - Rank: 240th (of 296)
  - Density: 648.5/sq mi (250.4/km^{2})

Ethnicity (2021)
  - Ethnic groups: List: 95.1% White; 2% Asian; 1.8% Mixed; 0.6% Black; 0.5% other

Religion (2021)
  - Religion: List: 51% Christianity; 40.8% no religion; 7.7% other; 0.5% Islam
- Time zone: UTC0 (GMT)
  - Summer (DST): UTC+1 (BST)
- ONS code: 23UG (ONS); E07000083 (GSS)
- OS grid reference: SO8855933566

The Borough of Tewkesbury is a local government district with borough status in Gloucestershire, England. The borough is named after its largest town, Tewkesbury where the council is based. The district also includes the town of Winchcombe and numerous villages including Bishops Cleeve, Ashchurch, Churchdown, Innsworth and Brockworth as well as other hamlets and surrounding rural areas. Parts of the district lie within the Cotswolds Area of Outstanding Natural Beauty.

The neighbouring districts are Cotswold, Cheltenham, Stroud, Gloucester, Forest of Dean, Malvern Hills and Wychavon.

== History ==
Prior to 1974 the borough of Tewkesbury only covered the town itself. The town was an ancient borough, having been granted a charter of incorporation by Elizabeth I in 1575. The town was reformed in 1836 to become a municipal borough under the Municipal Corporations Act 1835, governed by a body formally called the "mayor, aldermen and burgesses of the borough of Tewkesbury", but generally known as the corporation or town council.

The modern district was formed on 1 April 1974 under the Local Government Act 1972, and covered the whole area of Tewkesbury Municipal Borough and Cheltenham Rural District plus part of Gloucester Rural District; all three of which were abolished.

The new district was named Tewkesbury after its main town. The new district was awarded borough status from its creation, allowing the council to take the name Tewkesbury Borough Council and letting the chair of the council take the title of mayor. A successor parish was created at the same time covering the area of the former municipal borough of Tewkesbury, with the parish council taking the name Tewkesbury Town Council.

In 1991, the parishes of Leckhampton, Prestbury, Swindon and Up Hatherley were transferred to the neighbouring borough of Cheltenham.

In 2024, the council consulted its residents on whether the borough's name should be changed to "North Gloucestershire". The council voted to make the change at a meeting on 3 September 2024. The new name was to be brought into use from December 2024, but was delayed because of the potential implications for local government arising from a White Paper to be issued on devolution for England.

On 29 January 2025, the council had decided to scrap the proposed name change, owing to the aforementioned proposals on devolution, which would see the council merge with other Gloucestershire authorities, in a form yet to be agreed.

Under current local government reorganisation plans, the council will be abolished from 2028, with a single council for all of the current Gloucestershire County Council area.

== Governance ==
Tewkesbury Borough Council

Type
- Type: Non-metropolitan district

Leadership
- Mayor: George Porter, Liberal Democrat since 12 May 2026
- Leader: Richard Stanley, Liberal Democrat since 13 May 2023
- Chief Executive: Alistair Cunningham since 13 June 2022

Structure
- Seats: 38 councillors
- Graph of the party split among 38 seats.
- Political groups: All parties (38) Liberal Democrats (16) Conservative (8) Green (4) TTI (2) Reform (1) Independent (7)

Elections
- Voting system: First past the post
- Last election: 4 May 2023

Meeting place
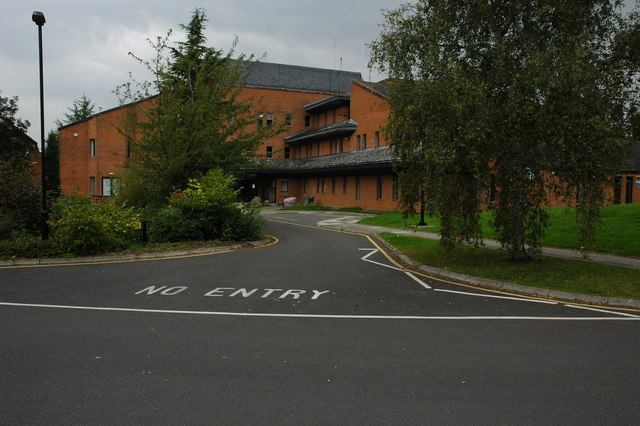
- Council Offices, Gloucester Road, Tewkesbury, GL20 5TT

Website
- www.tewkesbury.gov.uk

Tewkesbury Borough Council provides district-level services. County-level services are provided by Gloucestershire County Council. The whole district is also covered by civil parishes, which form a third tier of local government.

=== Political control ===
The council has been under no overall control since the 2023 election, with leadership roles shared between the Liberal Democrats, Greens and independent councillors.

The first election to the modern council was held in 1973, initially operating as a shadow authority alongside the outgoing authorities until the new arrangements took effect on 1 April 1974. Political control of the council since 1974 has been as follows:

| Party in control | Years |
|---|---|
| No overall control | 1974–1976 |
| Independent | 1976–1987 |
| No overall control | 1987–1991 |
| Independent | 1991–1995 |
| No overall control | 1995–2011 |
| Conservative | 2011–2023 |
| No overall control | 2023–present |

=== Leadership ===
The role of mayor is largely ceremonial. Political leadership is provided instead by the leader of the council. The leaders since 2007 have been:

| Councillor | Party | From | To |
|---|---|---|---|
| Robert Vines | Conservative | 2007 | 16 May 2017 |
| Dave Waters | Conservative | 16 May 2017 | May 2018 |
| Rob Bird | Conservative | 15 May 2018 | May 2023 |
| Richard Stanley | Liberal Democrats | 17 May 2023 | |

=== Composition ===
Following the 2023 election, and subsequent by-elections and changes of allegiance up to August 2026, the composition of the council was:

| Party | Councillors |
|---|---|
| Liberal Democrats | 16 |
| Conservative | 8 |
| Green | 4 |
| Tewkesbury and Twyning Independents | 2 |
| Reform | 1 |
| Independent | 7 |
| Total | 38 |

Of the independent councillors, two sit together as the "Isbourne and Winchcombe Independents", four sit with local party the Tewkesbury and Twyning Independents as a group called "The Independents", and the other is not aligned to a group.

=== Premises ===
The council is based at the Council Offices on Gloucester Road in Tewkesbury. The building was purpose-built for the council, being completed in 1976.

== Towns and parishes ==
The whole district is covered by civil parishes. The parish councils for Tewkesbury and Winchcombe take the style "town council". Some of the smaller parishes have a parish meeting rather than a parish council.

== Transport ==
Gloucestershire Airport is in the borough, near to Gloucester and Cheltenham. The borough is also served by Ashchurch for Tewkesbury railway station on the mainline. Heritage railway the Gloucestershire Warwickshire Railway also has a number of stations in the borough.

== Media ==
=== Television ===
The area is served by BBC West Midlands and ITV Central with television signals received from either the Ridge Hill or Sutton Coldfield TV transmitters. However, BBC West and ITV West Country are also received through cable and satellite television such as Freesat and Sky.

=== Radio ===
Radio stations for the area are:

- BBC Radio Gloucestershire
- Heart West
- Greatest Hits Radio South West
- Gloucester FM
- Radio Winchcombe (serving Winchcombe)

=== Newspapers ===
The area is served by these local newspapers:

- Gloucestershire Echo
- Evesham Journal.

== Elections ==
Since the last full review of boundaries in 2019 the council has comprised 38 councillors representing 20 wards, with each ward electing one, two or three councillors. Elections are held every four years.

As of May 2023, the councillors were:

| Ward | Councillor | Party |
|---|---|---|
| Badgeworth | Robert Vines | Conservative |
| Brockworth East | Charlotte Mills | Independent |
| Brockworth East | Jason Mills | Independent |
| Brockworth West | Craig Carter | Independent |
| Brockworth West | Deborah Harwood | Independent |
| Churchdown Brookfield with Hucclecote | Paul Smith | Liberal Democrats |
| Churchdown Brookfield with Hucclecote | Richard Smith | Liberal Democrats |
| Churchdown Brookfield with Hucclecote | Ian Yates | Liberal Democrats |
| Churchdown St John's | Stewart Dove | Liberal Democrats |
| Churchdown St John's | Mary Jordan | Liberal Democrats |
| Churchdown St John's | Liz Skelt | Liberal Democrats |
| Cleeve Grange | Thomas Budge | Liberal Democrats |
| Cleeve Hill | Nigel Adcock | Liberal Democrats |
| Cleeve Hill | Cheryl Agg | Liberal Democrats |
| Cleeve St Michael's | Alex Hegenbarth | Liberal Democrats |
| Cleeve St Michael's | Kashan Pervaiz | Liberal Democrats |
| Cleeve West | Richard Stanley | Liberal Democrats |
| Cleeve West | Murray Stewart | Liberal Democrats |
| Highnam with Haw Bridge | Paul McLain | Conservative |
| Highnam with Haw Bridge | Jill Smith | Conservative |
| Innsworth | Sarah Hands | Liberal Democrats |
| Innsworth | Paul Ockelton | Liberal Democrats |
| Isbourne | Christopher Coleman | Independent |
| Isbourne | Mel Gore | Conservative |
| Northway | Pauline Godwin | Conservative |
| Northway | Elaine MacTiernam | Independent |
| Severn Vale North | Heather McLain | Conservative |
| Severn Vale South | Mark Williams | Conservative |
| Shurdington | George Porter | Liberal Democrats |
| Tewkesbury East | Hilarie Bowman | Green |
| Tewkesbury East | Helena Sundarajoo | Green |
| Tewkesbury North and Twyning | Mike Sztymiak | Tewkesbury and Twyning Independents |
| Tewkesbury North and Twyning | Philip Workman | Tewkesbury and Twyning Independents |
| Tewkesbury South | Matt Dimond-Brown | Green |
| Tewkesbury South | Cate Cody | Green |
| Winchcombe | David Gray | Conservative |
| Winchcombe | Gemma Madle | Independent |
| Winchcombe | Jim Mason | Conservative |
