= Northleach Rural District =

Former local government area in the UK

Northleach Rural District was a rural district based around Northleach in Gloucestershire. It was founded in 1894 and was abolished in 1974 to found the Cotswold District.
