= Cotswold District =

Coordinates: 51.719°N 1.968°W

- Non-metropolitan district
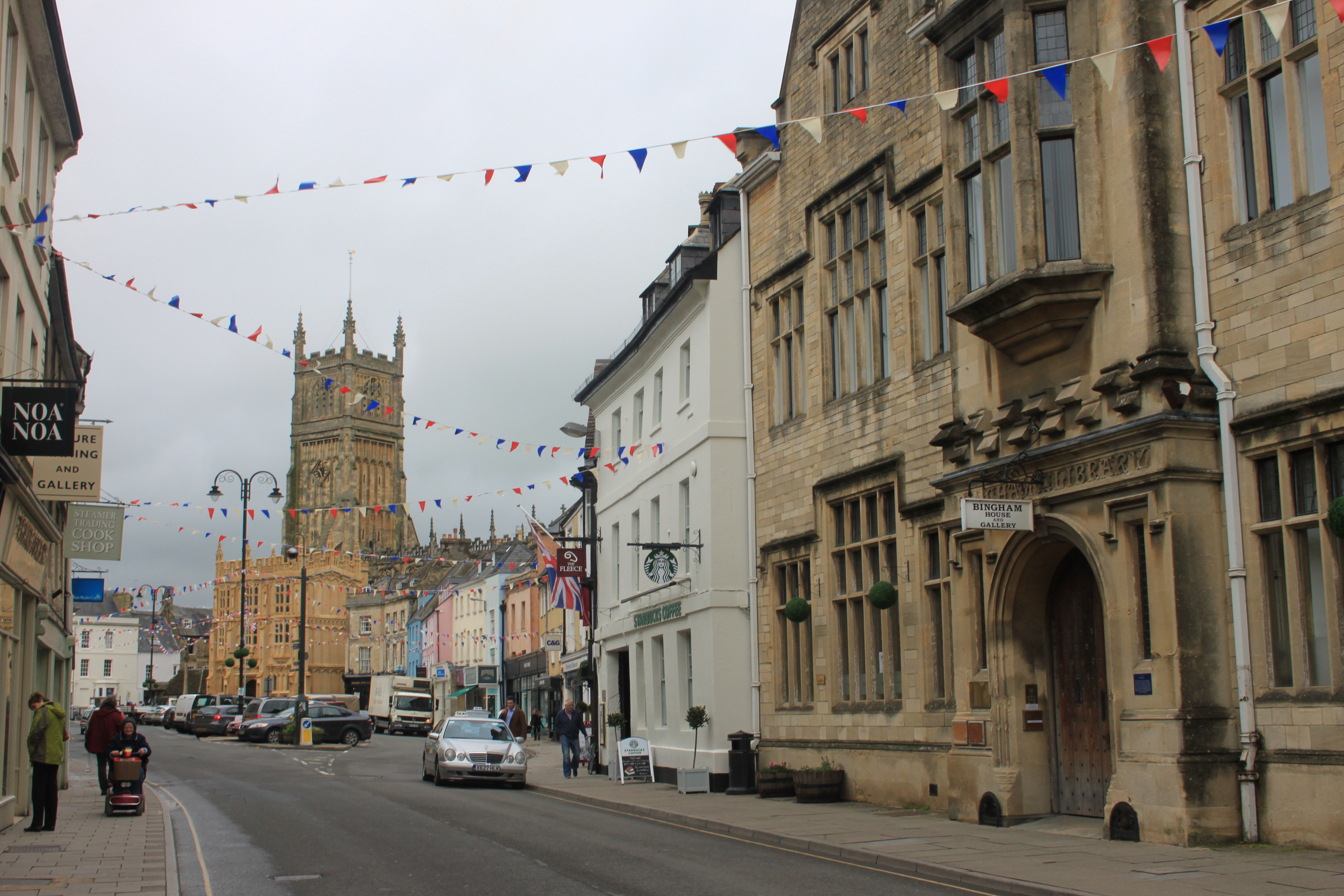
- Cirencester, the administrative centre of the Cotswold District

- Cotswold shown within Gloucestershire
- Sovereign state: United Kingdom
- Constituent country: England
- Region: South West England
- Non-metropolitan county: Gloucestershire
- Status: Non-metropolitan district
- Admin HQ: Cirencester
- Incorporated: 1 April 1974

Government
  - Type: Non-metropolitan district council
  - Body: Cotswold District Council
  - MPs: Geoffrey Clifton-Brown (C); Roz Savage (LD)

Area
  - Total: 449.6 sq mi (1,164.5 km^{2})
  - Rank: 20th (of 296)

Population (2025)
  - Total: 91,563
  - Rank: 266th (of 296)
  - Density: 203.65/sq mi (78.629/km^{2})

Ethnicity (2021)
  - Ethnic groups: List: 96.3% White; 1.5% Mixed; 1.3% Asian; 0.4% Black; 0.4% other

Religion (2021)
  - Religion: List: 55.7% Christianity; 36.7% no religion; 7.3% other; 0.3% Islam
- Time zone: UTC0 (GMT)
  - Summer (DST): UTC+1 (BST)
- ONS code: 23UC (ONS); E07000079 (GSS)
- OS grid reference: SP0221002304

Cotswold is a local government district in Gloucestershire, England. It is named after the wider Cotswolds region and range of hills. The council is based in the district's largest town of Cirencester. The district also includes the towns of Chipping Campden, Fairford, Lechlade, Moreton-in-Marsh, Northleach, Stow-on-the-Wold and Tetbury, along with numerous villages and surrounding rural areas.

In 2021 the district had a population of 91,125. The district covers nearly 450 square miles (1,200 km^{2}), with some 80% of the land located within the Cotswolds Area of Outstanding Natural Beauty. The much larger area referred to as the Cotswolds encompasses nearly 800 square miles, spanning five counties: Gloucestershire, Oxfordshire, Warwickshire, Wiltshire, and Worcestershire. This large Area of Outstanding Natural Beauty had a population of 139,000 in 2016.

Eighty per cent of the district lies within the River Thames catchment area, with the Thames itself and several tributaries including the River Windrush and River Leach running through the district. Lechlade is an important point on the river as the upstream limit of navigation. In the 2007 floods in the UK, rivers were the source of flooding of 53 per cent of the locations affected and the Thames at Lechlade reached record levels with over 100 reports of flooding.

The neighbouring districts are South Gloucestershire, Stroud, Tewkesbury, Cheltenham, Wychavon, Stratford-on-Avon, West Oxfordshire, Vale of White Horse, Swindon and Wiltshire.

== History ==
The district was formed on 1 April 1974 under the Local Government Act 1972. The new district covered the area of five former districts, which were all abolished at the same time:

- Cirencester Rural District
- Cirencester Urban District
- North Cotswold Rural District
- Northleach Rural District
- Tetbury Rural District

The new district was named Cotswold, reflecting its central position within the hills and wider region of that name.

Under current local government reorganisation plans, the council will be abolished from 2028, with a single council for all of the current Gloucestershire County Council area.

== Governance ==
Cotswold District Council

Type
- Type: Non-metropolitan district

Leadership
- Chair: Mark Harris, Liberal Democrat since 21 May 2025
- Leader: Mike Evemy, Liberal Democrats since 21 May 2025
- Chief Executive: Jane Portman since June 2025

Structure
- Seats: 34 councillors
- Graph of the party split among 34 seats.
- Political groups: Administration (22) Liberal Democrats (22) Other parties (12) Conservative (11) Independent (1)

Elections
- Voting system: First past the post
- Last election: 4 May 2023

Meeting place
- Council Offices, Trinity Road, Cirencester, GL7 1PX

Website
- www.cotswold.gov.uk

Cotswold District Council provides district-level services. County-level services are provided by Gloucestershire County Council. The whole district is also covered by civil parishes, which form a third tier of local government.

=== Political control ===
The council has been under Liberal Democrat majority control since the 2019 election.

The first election to the council was held in 1973, initially operating as a shadow authority alongside the outgoing authorities until the new arrangements took effect on 1 April 1974. Political control of the council since 1974 has been as follows:

Party in control	Years
Independent	1974–1999
No overall control	1999–2003
Conservative	2003–2019
Liberal Democrats	2019–present

=== Leadership ===
The council has a ceremonial chair of the council who presides at council meetings and acts as the district's first citizen. Political leadership is instead provided by the leader of the council. The leaders since 2003 have been:

Councillor	Party	From	To
Julie Girling	Conservative	May 2003	May 2006
Lynden Stowe	Conservative	May 2006	16 May 2017
Mark Annett	Conservative	16 May 2017	Sep 2018
Tony Berry	Conservative	11 Dec 2018	14 May 2019
Joe Harris	Liberal Democrats	14 May 2019	20 May 2025
Mike Evemy	Liberal Democrats	21 May 2025	

=== Composition ===
At the 2023 election the Liberal Democrats extended their majority. Following subsequent by-elections and a resignation up to July 2026, the composition of the council was:

Party	Councillors
Liberal Democrats	22
Conservative	10
Green	1
Independent	1
Total	34

=== Premises ===
The council is based at the Council Offices on Trinity Road in Cirencester. The building was built in 1837 as the Cirencester Union Workhouse, later serving as Watermoor Hospital following the creation of the National Health Service in 1948. After the hospital closed the building was converted to become the council's headquarters, being formally opened by Prince Charles on 21 May 1981.

== Towns and parishes ==
The whole district is covered by civil parishes. The parish councils for Chipping Campden, Cirencester, Fairford, Lechlade, Moreton-in-Marsh, Northleach with Eastington, Stow-on-the-Wold and Tetbury take the style "town council". Some of the smaller parishes have a parish meeting rather than a parish council.

== Media ==
In terms of television, the area receives various transmitters from different regions:

- Mendip (BBC West/ITV West Country) covering Cirencester and Tetbury.
- Oxford (BBC South/ITV Meridian) covering Stow-on-the-Wold, Lechlade, Northleach and Fairford.
- Sutton Coldfield (BBC West Midlands/ITV Central) covering Chipping Campden and Moreton-in-Marsh.

Radio stations for the area are:

- BBC Radio Gloucestershire
- BBC Radio Wiltshire
- BBC CWR
- Heart West
- Capital Mid-Counties
- Greatest Hits Radio South West
- Corinium Radio (serving Cirencester)
- North Cotswold Community Radio (serving North Cotswolds)
- Cotswolds Radio

The district is served by the weekly local newspaper, Wilts and Gloucestershire Standard.

== Elections ==
Since the last full review of boundaries in 2015 the council has comprised 34 councillors representing 32 wards, with two wards electing two councillors and the rest electing one each. Elections are held every four years.

=== Councillors ===
There are 34 councillors. After the 2023 election, there were 18 Liberal Democrats, 14 Conservatives, one independent and one Green.

This table reflects the changes following several by-elections since 2023.

Ward	Councillor	Party
Abbey	Mark Harris	Liberal Democrats
Blockley	Clare Turner	Green
Bourton Vale	Len Wilkins	Conservative
Bourton Village	Jon Wareing	Liberal Democrats
Campden and Vale	Gina Blomefield	Conservative
Campden and Vale	Tom Stowe	Conservative
Chedworth and Churn Valley	Paul Hodgkinson	Liberal Democrats
Chesterton	Andrea Ann Pellegram	Liberal Democrats
Coln Valley	John Fowles	Conservative
Ermin	Julia Judd	Conservative
Fairford North	Michael Vann	Liberal Democrats
Fosseridge	David Cunningham	Conservative
Four Acres	Ray Brassington	Liberal Democrats
Grumbolds Ash with Avening	Tony Slater	Conservative
Kemble	Mike McKeown	Liberal Democrats
Lechlade, Kempsford and Fairford South	Tristan Wilkinson	Liberal Democrats
Lechlade, Kempsford and Fairford South	Helene Mansilla	Liberal Democrats
Moreton East	Angus Jenkinson	Liberal Democrats
Moreton West	Daryl Corps	Conservative
New Mills	Claire Bloomer	Liberal Democrats
Northleach	Tony Dale	Liberal Democrats
Sandywell	Jeremy Theyer	Conservative
Siddington and Cerney Rural	Mike Evemy	Liberal Democrats
South Cerney Village	Juliet Layton	Liberal Democrats
St Michael's	Naomi Bloomer	Liberal Democrats
Stow	Dilys Neill	Liberal Democrats
Stratton	Patrick Coleman	Liberal Democrats
Tetbury East and Rural	Nikki Ind	Independent
Tetbury Central	Ian Watson	Liberal Democrats
Tetbury with Upton	Laura Hall-Wilson	Conservative
The Ampneys and Hampton	Lisa Spivey	Liberal Democrats
The Beeches	Paul Evans	Liberal Democrats
The Rissingtons	Craig Thurling	Liberal Democrats
Watermoor	Nick Bridges	Liberal Democrats

=== Chairs of the Council ===
Councillor	Party	From	To
D C Leadbeater	Independent	1973	1976
C Staite	Independent	1976	1977
J Clark	Independent	1977	1981
I Lamb	Conservative	1981	1983
H Groves	Independent	1983	1986
P Cutts	Independent	1986	1989
I Maitland Hume	Independent	1989	1991
D Godman	Independent	1991	1993
M Brown	Independent	1993	1995
Sue Herdman	Independent	1995	1998
P Pretty	Independent	1998	1999
B Evans	Independent	1999	2001
Tim Royle	Conservative	2001	2004
Sue Jepson	Conservative	2004	2007
Sheila Jeffery	Conservative	2007	2009
Ben Jeffrey	Conservative	2009	2010
Carolyn Nicolle	Conservative	2010	2012
Edward Horsfall	Conservative	2012	2014
Clive Bennett	Conservative	2014	2015
Mark Annett	Conservative	2015	2017
Julian Beale	Conservative	2017	2019
Nigel Robbins	Liberal Democrats	2019	2021
Dilys Neill	Liberal Democrats	2021	2023
Nikki Ind	Independent	2023	2025
Mark Harris	Liberal Democrats	2025	
