= Cheltenham Rural District =

District in Gloucestershire, England

Cheltenham Rural District was a district in Gloucestershire. It was founded in 1894 and abolished in 1974 after being merged into the new Tewkesbury District.
