= Sodbury Rural District =

Former local government area in the UK

Sodbury Rural District was a district in Gloucestershire. It was founded in 1935 and abolished in 1974 to form Northavon.
