= Forest of Dean District =

Coordinates: 51°47′N 2°33′W

- Non-metropolitan district
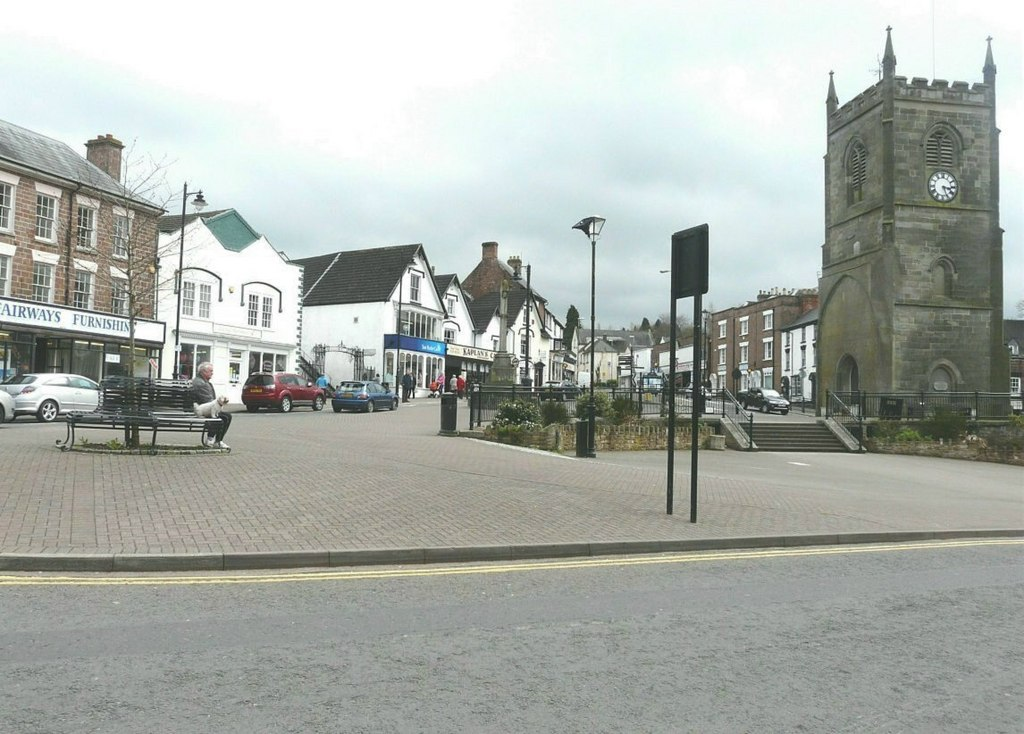
- Coleford Market Place, the town where Forest of Dean District Council is based

- Forest of Dean shown within Gloucestershire
- Sovereign state: United Kingdom
- Constituent country: England
- Region: South West England
- Non-metropolitan county: Gloucestershire
- Status: Non-metropolitan district
- Admin HQ: Coleford
- Incorporated: 1 April 1974

Government
  - Type: Non-metropolitan district council
  - Body: Forest of Dean District Council
  - Leadership: Leader & Cabinet
  - MP: Matt Bishop

Area
  - Total: 203.2 sq mi (526.4 km^{2})
  - Rank: 75th (of 296)

Population (2025)
  - Total: 90,157
  - Rank: 271st (of 296)
  - Density: 443.6/sq mi (171.3/km^{2})

Ethnicity (2021)
  - Ethnic groups: List: 97.5% White; 1.1% Mixed; 0.7% Asian; 0.4% other; 0.3% Black

Religion (2021)
  - Religion: List: 50.5% Christianity; 41.6% no religion; 7.6% other; 0.3% Islam
- Time zone: UTC0 (GMT)
  - Summer (DST): UTC+1 (BST)
- ONS code: 23UD (ONS); E07000080 (GSS)
- OS grid reference: SO6206309601

Forest of Dean is a local government district in west Gloucestershire, England, named after the Forest of Dean. Its council is based in Coleford. Other towns and villages in the district include Blakeney, Cinderford, Drybrook, English Bicknor, Huntley, Littledean, Longhope, Lydbrook, Lydney, Mitcheldean, Newnham and Newent.

== History ==
The district was formed on 1 April 1974 under the Local Government Act 1972. The new district covered the whole area of four former districts and part of a fifth, which were all abolished at the same time:

- East Dean Rural District
- Gloucester Rural District (parishes of Newnham and Westbury-on-Severn only)
- Lydney Rural District
- Newent Rural District
- West Dean Rural District

The new district was named Forest of Dean after the ancient woodland which covers much of the district.

Under current local government reorganisation plans, the council will be abolished from 2028, with a single council for all of the current Gloucestershire County Council area.

== Governance ==
Forest of Dean District Council

Type
- Type: Non-metropolitan district

Leadership
- Chair: Di Martin, Labour since 25 May 2023
- Leader: Adrian Birch, Green since 18 April 2024
- Chief Executive: Nigel Brinn since November 2023

Structure
- Seats: 38 councillors
- Graph of the party split among 38 seats.
- Political groups: Administration (15) Green (15) Other parties (23) Conservative (6) Labour (4) Liberal Democrats (1) Reform (1) Independent (11)

Elections
- Voting system: First past the post
- Last election: 4 May 2023

Meeting place
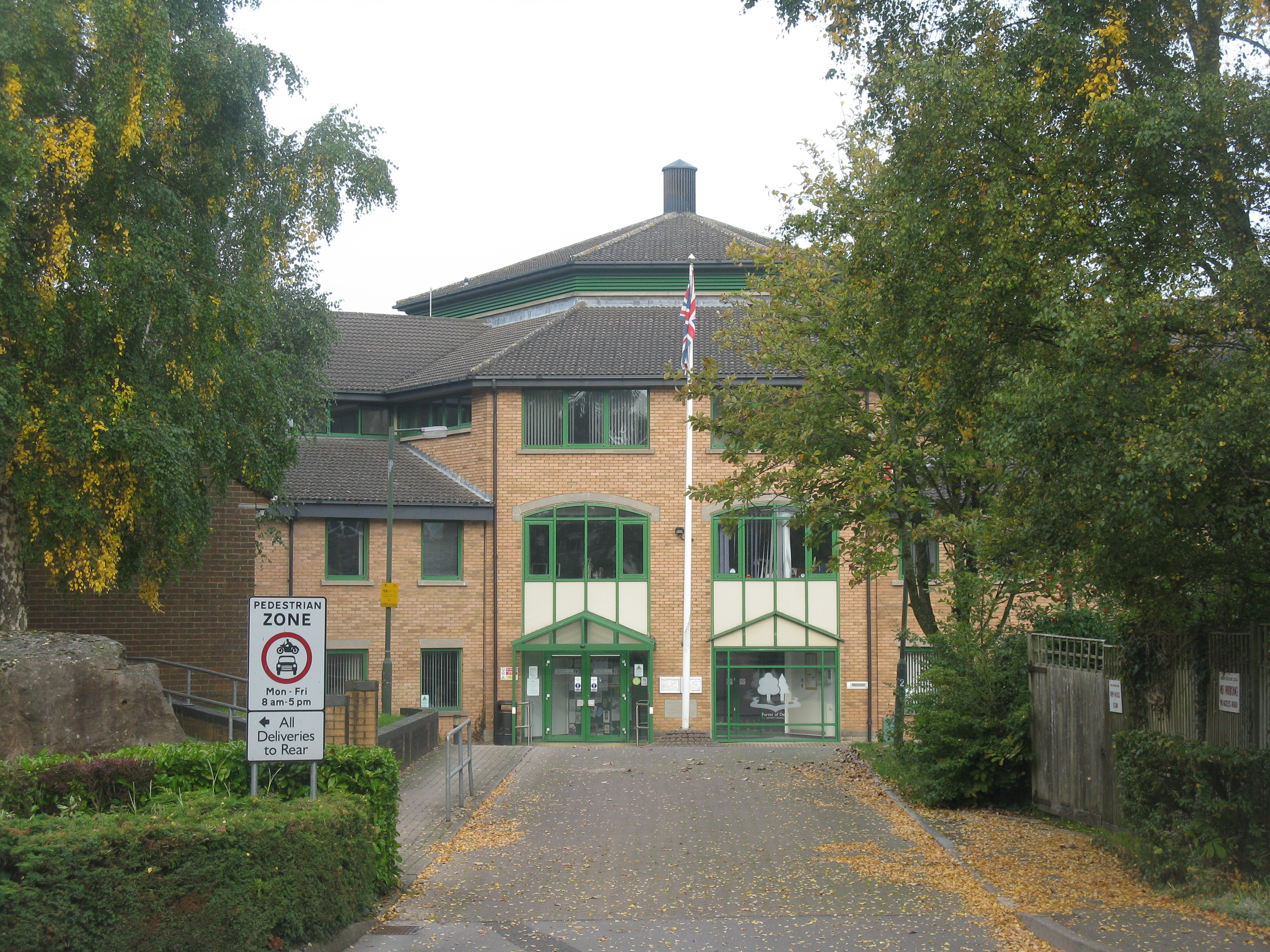
- Council Offices, High Street, Coleford, GL16 8HG

Website
- www.fdean.gov.uk

Forest of Dean District Council provides district-level services. County-level services are provided by Gloucestershire County Council. The whole district is also covered by civil parishes, which form a third tier of local government.

=== Political control ===
Since the 2023 election the council has been run by a Green minority administration with support from Labour on a confidence and supply basis.

The first election to the council was held in 1973, initially operating as a shadow authority alongside the outgoing authorities until the new arrangements came into effect on 1 April 1974. Political control of the council since 1974 has been as follows:

Party in control	Years
Independent	1974–1976
No overall control	1976–1991
Labour	1991–2003
No overall control	2003–present

=== Leadership ===
The leaders of the council since 2007 have been:

Councillor	Party	From	To
Marion Winship	Conservative	24 May 2007	Sep 2009
Peter Amos	Conservative	11 Sep 2009	May 2011
Patrick Molyneux	Conservative	26 May 2011	13 Jul 2017
Tim Gwilliam	Independent	13 Jul 2017	25 May 2023
Mark Topping	Green	25 May 2023	18 Apr 2024
Adrian Birch	Green	18 Apr 2024	

=== Composition ===
Following the 2023 election, and subsequent by-elections and changes of allegiance up to May 2026 the composition of the council was:

Party	Seats
Green	15
Conservative	6
Labour	4
Liberal Democrats	1
Reform	1
Independent	11
Total	38

Of the independent councillors, six sit together as the "Independent Group", four form the "Progressive Independent Group", and the other is not aligned to a group.

=== Premises ===
The council is based at the Council Offices on High Street in Coleford.

== Elections ==
Since the last boundary changes in 2019, the council has comprised 38 councillors elected from 21 wards, with each ward electing one, two or three councillors. Elections are held every four years.

== Parishes and settlements ==
The whole district is divided into civil parishes. The parish councils of Cinderford, Coleford, Lydney and Newent take the style "town council".

Settlements include:

- Alvington, Awre, Aylburton
- Blaisdon, Birdwood, Bream, Brockweir, Bromsberrow, Blakeney
- Churcham, Cinderford, Coleford
- Drybrook, Dymock
- Ellwood, English Bicknor
- Gorsley and Kilcot
- Hartpury, Hewelsfield, Highleadon, Huntley
- Kempley
- Littledean, Little London, Longhope, Lydbrook, Lydney
- Malswick, Mitcheldean
- Newent, Newland, Newnham
- Oxenhall
- Pauntley, Parkend
- Redmarley D'Abitot, Ruardean, Rudford, Ruspidge
- Soudley, St. Briavels, Staunton (near Coleford), Symonds Yat
- Taynton, Tibberton, Tidenham
- Upleadon
- Westbury-on-Severn, West Dean, Woolaston

== Media ==
=== Television ===
The district is served by BBC West and ITV West Country with television signals received from the Mendip TV transmitter. Northern parts of the district is served by BBC West Midlands and ITV Central with television signals received from the Ridge Hill transmitter.

=== Radio ===
Radio stations for the area are:

- BBC Radio Gloucestershire on 104.7 FM and 1413 AM.
- BBC Hereford and Worcester can also be received on 94.7 FM.
- Heart West on 102.4 FM.
- Greatest Hits Radio South West on 107.5 FM.
- Dean Radio, a community radio station which broadcast on 95.7 FM and 105.6 FM.

=== Newspapers ===
The district's local newspaper is The Forester.
