= Grade I listed buildings in Cotswold (district) =

Gloucestershire shown in England

There are over 9,000 Grade I listed buildings in England. This page is a list of these buildings in the Cotswold district in Gloucestershire.

== List of buildings ==
Name	Location	Type	Completed (Note: The date given is the date used by Historic England as significant for the initial building or that of an important part in the structure's description.)	Date designated	Grid ref. (Note: The grid reference is based on the British national grid reference system, sometimes known as OSGB36, used by the Ordnance Survey.) Geo-coordinates	Entry number (Note: The "List Entry Number" is a unique number assigned to each listed building and scheduled monument by Historic England.)	Image
Church of St Peter	Daylesford Village, Adlestrop	Church	1860	25 August 1960	SP242258; 51°55′52″N 1°38′53″W	1341122	Church of St Peter More images
Daylesford House	Daylesford House, Adlestrop	Country house	1787–83	25 August 1960	SP254264; 51°56′10″N 1°37′53″W	1303879	Daylesford House More images
Daylesford House Orangery	Adlestrop	Orangery	Early 19th century	25 August 1960	SP255264; 51°56′10″N 1°37′50″W	1089834	Upload Photo
Church of St Bartholomew	Aldsworth	Anglican church	1842–43	26 January 1961	SP153099; 51°47′18″N 1°46′42″W	1340781	Church of St Bartholomew More images
Church of the Holy Rood	Ampney Crucis	Church	Saxon	26 November 1958	SP065018; 51°42′57″N 1°54′26″W	1172051	Church of the Holy Rood More images
Cross in churchyard of Church of the Holy Rood	Ampney Crucis	Cross	Late 14th/early 15th century	26 November 1958	SP065018; 51°42′56″N 1°54′26″W	1090016	Cross in churchyard of Church of the Holy Rood More images
Church of St Mary	Ampney St Mary	Church	Early 12th century	26 November 1958	SP075015; 51°42′45″N 1°53′31″W	1089958	Church of St Mary More images
Church of the Holy Cross	Avening	Church	Late 11th century	6 September 1954	ST879979; 51°40′50″N 2°10′32″W	1341564	Church of the Holy Cross More images
Church of St Margaret	Bagendon	Anglican church	Early–late 12th century	26 November 1958	SP011066; 51°45′31″N 1°59′06″W	1090271	Church of St Margaret More images
Barnsley Park	Barnsley Park Estate, Barnsley	Country house	1720	4 June 1952	SP080058; 51°45′04″N 1°53′06″W	1155256	Barnsley Park More images
Barrington Park	Barrington	Country house	1736–38	23 January 1952	SP203135; 51°49′13″N 1°42′20″W	1172292	Barrington Park More images
Church of St Peter	Little Barrington, Barrington	Anglican church	Late 12th century	26 January 1961	SP208127; 51°48′47″N 1°41′54″W	1152539	Church of St Peter More images
Church of St Leonard	Lower Lemington, Batsford	Anglican church	12th century	25 August 1960	SP218345; 52°00′32″N 1°40′57″W	1089543	Church of St Leonard More images
Beverston Castle	Beverston	Castle	c.1225	6 September 1954	ST861939; 51°38′39″N 2°12′05″W	1304508	Beverston Castle More images
Gatehouse to Beverston Castle	Beverston	Gatehouse	14th century	16 March 1987	ST861939; 51°38′39″N 2°12′04″W	1089720	Gatehouse to Beverston Castle More images
Chavenage House and Chapel	Beverston	Manor house	1576	16 March 1987	ST871951; 51°39′19″N 2°11′11″W	1152854	Chavenage House and Chapel More images
Ablington Manor	Ablington, Bibury	Manor house	1590	23 January 1952	SP103076; 51°46′01″N 1°51′05″W	1341833	Ablington Manor More images
Arlington Row	Bibury	House	Late 14th century	23 January 1952	SP114066; 51°45′31″N 1°50′05″W	1155677	Arlington Row More images
Bibury Court Hotel	Bibury	Country house/Hotel	Late 16th century	23 January 1952	SP118064; 51°45′25″N 1°49′46″W	1155708	Bibury Court Hotel More images
Church of St Mary	Bibury	Parish church	Mid–late 11th century	26 January 1961	SP118065; 51°45′26″N 1°49′48″W	1155770	Church of St Mary More images
Church of St Leonard	Bledington	Church	12th century	25 August 1960	SP245225; 51°54′03″N 1°38′43″W	1089811	Church of St Leonard More images
Northwick Park	Blockley	Country house	Early 17th century	25 August 1960	SP167363; 52°01′32″N 1°45′25″W	1088590	Northwick Park More images
Church of St Lawrence	Bourton-on-the-Hill	Church	12th century	25 August 1960	SP175325; 51°59′27″N 1°44′46″W	1341241	Church of St Lawrence More images
Tithe Barn, Bourton House	Bourton-on-the-Hill	Tithe barn	1570	11 January 1985	SP177324; 51°59′24″N 1°44′32″W	1172027	Tithe Barn, Bourton House More images
Church of St Michael	Brimpsfield	Parish church	Early 12th century	26 November 1958	SO942128; 51°48′51″N 2°05′08″W	1088482	Church of St Michael More images
Shayler Monument in the churchyard of the Church of St Paul about 4m east of the vestry	Broadwell	Table tomb	17th century	30 January 1987	SP200277; 51°56′51″N 1°42′35″W	1341112	Shayler Monument in the churchyard of the Church of St Paul about 4m east of the vestry More images
Church of St Andrew	Chedworth	Anglican church	Late 12th century and later	26 January 1961	SP051121; 51°48′28″N 1°55′35″W	1090247	Church of St Andrew More images
Church of St Nicholas	Cherington	Parish church	12th century foundation	6 September 1954	ST902985; 51°41′08″N 2°08′31″W	1088838	Church of St Nicholas More images
Almshouses	Chipping Campden	Almshouse	1612	25 August 1960	SP153393; 52°03′08″N 1°46′38″W	1078454	Almshouses More images
Church of St James	Chipping Campden	Church	Predominantly mid–late 15th century	25 August 1960	SP154394; 52°03′12″N 1°46′33″W	1341977	Church of St James More images
Grevel's House	Chipping Campden	House	Late 16th century	25 August 1960	SP152393; 52°03′07″N 1°46′45″W	1342004	Grevel's House More images
Market Hall	Chipping Campden	Market hall	1627	25 August 1960	SP151391; 52°03′03″N 1°46′51″W	1078442	Market Hall More images
Woolstaplers' Hall	Chipping Campden	House	Largely 15th century	25 August 1960	SP152392; 52°03′06″N 1°46′44″W	1172611	Woolstaplers' Hall More images
Church of St John the Baptist and attached railings and gates	Cirencester	Church	Chancel c.1115	14 June 1948	SP023020; 51°43′03″N 1°58′04″W	1206356	Church of St John the Baptist and attached railings and gates More images
Hospital of St John	Cirencester	House	1133	14 June 1948	SP021023; 51°43′12″N 1°58′13″W	1280130	Hospital of St John More images
Spital Gate and attached cottage	Cirencester	Abbey	Late 12th century	14 June 1948	SP023024; 51°43′16″N 1°58′02″W	1187492	Spital Gate and attached cottage More images
Church of St Andrew	Cold Aston	Anglican church	12th century	26 January 1961	SP127199; 51°52′39″N 1°48′56″W	1089877	Church of St Andrew More images
Church of St Andrew	Coln Rogers, Coln St. Dennis	Anglican church	11th century	26 January 1961	SP087096; 51°47′09″N 1°52′29″W	1340898	Church of St Andrew More images
Church of St James	Coln St. Dennis	Anglican church	12th century	26 January 1961	SP085109; 51°47′49″N 1°52′36″W	1340914	Church of St James More images
Church of the Holy Rood	Daglingworth	Anglican church	11th century	26 November 1958	SO993049; 51°44′37″N 2°00′40″W	1090207	Church of the Holy Rood More images
Church of St Laurence	Didmarton	Church	Possibly 13th-century core	6 September 1954	ST822874; 51°35′08″N 2°15′28″W	1089699	Church of St Laurence More images
Worcester Lodge to Badminton Park, with flanking quadrant walls and terminal projections	Didmarton	Gate	1746	6 September 1954	ST810871; 51°34′58″N 2°16′31″W	1153252	Worcester Lodge to Badminton Park, with flanking quadrant walls and terminal projections More images
Church of Saint Michael and All Saints	Lower Dowdeswell, Dowdeswell	Parish church	12th century	26 January 1961	SP001199; 51°52′40″N 1°59′59″W	1154480	Church of Saint Michael and All Saints More images
Church of All Saints	Down Ampney	Church	1265	26 November 1958	SU098965; 51°40′03″N 1°51′33″W	1089941	Church of All Saints More images
Down Ampney House	Down Ampney	House	c.1779	4 June 1952	SU097965; 51°40′05″N 1°51′36″W	1341033	Down Ampney House More images
Church of St Michael	Duntisbourne Rouse	Parish church	Late 11th or early 12th century	26 November 1958	SO985060; 51°45′12″N 2°01′22″W	1088429	Church of St Michael More images
Church of St Andrew	Eastleach Turville, Eastleach	Parish church	12th century	26 January 1961	SP202053; 51°44′47″N 1°42′32″W	1089225	Church of St Andrew More images
Church of St Michael and St Martin	Eastleach Martin, Eastleach	Parish church	12th century	26 January 1961	SP202052; 51°44′43″N 1°42′30″W	1156545	Church of St Michael and St Martin More images
Church of St Eadburga	Ebrington	Church	Norman	25 August 1960	SP183399; 52°03′29″N 1°44′00″W	1170800	Church of St Eadburga More images
Hidcote Manor	Hidcote Boyce, Ebrington	Manor house	1663	25 August 1960	SP171422; 52°04′42″N 1°45′04″W	1305819	Hidcote Manor More images
Church of St Mary	Edgeworth	Parish church	11th century	26 November 1958	SO948059; 51°45′08″N 2°04′35″W	1305299	Church of St Mary More images
Church of St John the Evangelist	Elkstone	Parish church	12th century	26 November 1958	SO967122; 51°48′33″N 2°02′57″W	1088444	Church of St John the Evangelist More images
Church of St Mary	Fairford	Church	Early 15th century	26 November 1958	SP151011; 51°42′33″N 1°46′56″W	1089998	Church of St Mary More images
Church of St Peter	Farmington	Anglican church	12th century	26 January 1961	SP136152; 51°50′09″N 1°48′12″W	1090503	Church of St Peter More images
Church of St George	Hampnett	Anglican church	12th century	26 January 1961	SP100156; 51°50′23″N 1°51′21″W	1341104	Church of St George More images
Church of St Mary	Icomb	Anglican church	15th century	25 August 1960	SP213226; 51°54′06″N 1°41′26″W	1340841	Church of St Mary More images
Icomb Place	Icomb	Manor house	Rebuilt c.1420	25 August 1960	SP210224; 51°54′00″N 1°41′42″W	1153494	Icomb Place More images
Church of St Mary the Virgin	Kempsford	Anglican church	Early 12th century	26 November 1958	SU161964; 51°40′01″N 1°46′05″W	1089451	Church of St Mary the Virgin More images
Church of St Lawrence	Lechlade	Anglican church	13th century	26 November 1958	SU214995; 51°41′38″N 1°41′26″W	1155874	Church of St Lawrence More images
Church of St James	Longborough	Church	12th century	25 August 1960	SP179297; 51°57′57″N 1°44′27″W	1089762	Church of St James More images
Church of St Lawrence	Mickleton	Anglican church	12th century	25 August 1960	SP161435; 52°05′23″N 1°45′54″W	1088526	Church of St Lawrence More images
Medford House and garden walls	Mickleton	Manor house	c.1694	25 August 1960	SP160435; 52°05′23″N 1°46′00″W	1305720	Medford House and garden walls More images
Church of All Saints	North Cerney	Anglican church	Early 12th century	26 November 1958	SP018077; 51°46′08″N 1°58′28″W	1090185	Church of All Saints More images
Church of St Peter and St Paul	Northleach, Northleach with Eastington	Anglican church	15th century	26 January 1961	SP111145; 51°49′47″N 1°50′20″W	1340797	Church of St Peter and St Paul More images
Church of St Bartholomew	Notgrove	Anglican church	12th century	26 January 1961	SP109199; 51°52′40″N 1°50′33″W	1153880	Church of St Bartholomew More images
Church of St Nicholas	Lower Oddington, Oddington	Church	12th century	25 August 1960	SP234255; 51°55′41″N 1°39′35″W	1155273	Church of St Nicholas More images
Newark Park	Ozleworth	Country house	Early 17th century	6 September 1954	ST781931; 51°38′11″N 2°19′04″W	1227685	Newark Park More images
The Manor House and gatepiers	Poulton	Manor house	Late 17th century	4 June 1952	SP100009; 51°42′27″N 1°51′24″W	1304257	The Manor House and gatepiers More images
Church of St Swithin	Quenington	Church	Recorded by 1100	26 November 1958	SP148039; 51°44′01″N 1°47′12″W	1341036	Church of St Swithin More images
Dovecote at Knights Gate	Quenington	Dovecote	Reputedly 1338	4 June 1952	SP147039; 51°44′01″N 1°47′16″W	1153047	Upload Photo
Knights Hospitallers Gateway at Knights Gate	Quenington	Gatehouse	12th century	4 June 1952	SP148039; 51°44′03″N 1°47′13″W	1089944	Knights Hospitallers Gateway at Knights Gate More images
Church of St Peter	Rendcomb	Anglican church	Rebuilt 16th century	26 November 1958	SP018097; 51°47′12″N 1°58′28″W	1154015	Church of St Peter More images
Rodmarton Manor	Rodmarton	Country house	1909–26	4 June 1952	ST943977; 51°40′41″N 2°05′01″W	1341402	Rodmarton Manor More images
Church of St Nicholas	Saintbury	Church	Norman	25 August 1960	SP117394; 52°03′12″N 1°49′50″W	1088496	Church of St Nicholas More images
Church of St Kenelm	Sapperton	Parish church	Early 12th century	26 November 1958	SO947034; 51°43′46″N 2°04′39″W	1089678	Church of St Kenelm More images
Church of St Andrew	Upper Sevenhampton, Sevenhampton	Parish church	12th century	26 January 1961	SP032217; 51°53′39″N 1°57′14″W	1341334	Church of St Andrew More images
Sezincote House	Sezincote Park, Sezincote	Country house	1800–05	25 August 1960	SP171310; 51°58′41″N 1°45′05″W	1341231	Sezincote House More images
Tent Room and attached accommodation block, Sezincote House	Sezincote Park, Sezincote	Apartment	Mid-19th century	11 January 1985	SP171310; 51°58′41″N 1°45′07″W	1089539	Tent Room and attached accommodation block, Sezincote House
The Orangery, Sezincote House	Sezincote Park, Sezincote	Orangery	1800–05	11 January 1985	SP171310; 51°58′40″N 1°45′07″W	1305074	The Orangery, Sezincote House More images
Lodge Park and adjoining walls and railings	Lodge Park, Sherborne	House	Mid-17th century	23 January 1952	SP145122; 51°48′32″N 1°47′25″W	1340791	Lodge Park and adjoining walls and railings More images
Church of St Mary	Shipton Solars, Shipton	Parish church	13th century	26 January 1961	SP031184; 51°51′54″N 1°57′22″W	1341358	Church of St Mary More images
Church of St Oswald	Shipton Oliffe, Shipton	Parish church	12th century	26 January 1961	SP037185; 51°51′56″N 1°56′51″W	1341338	Church of St Oswald More images
Church of All Hallows	South Cerney	Church	Norman	26 November 1958	SU049973; 51°40′29″N 1°55′45″W	1340977	Church of All Hallows More images
Church of St Peter	Southrop	Parish church	Early 12th century	26 January 1961	SP202034; 51°43′45″N 1°42′32″W	1089198	Church of St Peter More images
Parish Church of St Edward	Stow-on-the-Wold	Parish church	Saxon origins	25 August 1960	SP190257; 51°55′48″N 1°43′25″W	1078369	Parish Church of St Edward More images
Church of St Mary	Upper Swell, Swell	Parish church	12th century	25 August 1960	SP176268; 51°56′23″N 1°44′39″W	1221790	Church of St Mary More images
Church of St Mary the Virgin	Syde	Parish church	Early 12th century	26 November 1958	SO949108; 51°47′46″N 2°04′30″W	1305201	Church of St Mary the Virgin More images
Church of St Faith	Temple Guiting	Anglican church	Saxo-Norman	25 August 1960	SP061290; 51°57′35″N 1°54′43″W	1089514	Church of St Faith More images
Church of St Mary	Temple Guiting	Church	12th century	25 August 1960	SP091278; 51°56′56″N 1°52′06″W	1089478	Church of St Mary More images
Manor Farmhouse and Dovecote	Temple Guiting	Manor house	Early 16th century	25 August 1960	SP091280; 51°57′03″N 1°52′08″W	1089482	Manor Farmhouse and Dovecote More images
Church of St Mary the Virgin	Tetbury	Church	1781	21 March 1985	ST890929; 51°38′07″N 2°09′35″W	1153076	Church of St Mary the Virgin More images
Market House	Tetbury	Timber-framed house	1655	6 September 1954	ST890931; 51°38′12″N 2°09′34″W	1303914	Market House More images
Porch House	Tetbury	Terraced house	Late 16th century	6 September 1954	ST889932; 51°38′18″N 2°09′42″W	1089587	Porch House More images
5, 13 and 15 The Chipping	Tetbury	House	12th/13th century	6 September 1954	ST891932; 51°38′17″N 2°09′29″W	1089690	5, 13 and 15 The Chipping More images
Doughton Manor and gate piers to north	Doughton, Tetbury Upton	Manor house	c.1628–41	6 September 1954	ST880915; 51°37′20″N 2°10′30″W	1155345	Doughton Manor and gate piers to north More images
Church of St Thomas of Canterbury	Todenham	Church	14th century	25 August 1960	SP243363; 52°01′29″N 1°38′49″W	1152576	Church of St Thomas of Canterbury More images
Church of All Saints	Turkdean	Anglican church	12th century	26 January 1961	SP107174; 51°51′19″N 1°50′43″W	1089820	Church of All Saints More images
Manor House	Upper Slaughter	Manor house	Early 17th century	16 July 1986	SP156230; 51°54′21″N 1°46′26″W	1237768	Manor House More images
Westonbirt House with South Terrace	Westonbirt with Lasborough	Country house	1863–70	16 March 1987	ST863896; 51°36′19″N 2°11′54″W	1235736	Westonbirt House with South Terrace More images
Whittington Court	Whittington	Manor house	16th century	23 January 1952	SP012206; 51°53′04″N 1°58′57″W	1341326	Whittington Court More images
Church of St Laurence	Wyck Rissington	Anglican church	12th century	25 August 1960	SP191214; 51°53′30″N 1°43′23″W	1303915	Church of St Laurence More images
Church of St Peter	Willersey	Anglican church	12th century	25 August 1960	SP107396; 52°03′19″N 1°50′43″W	1088473	Church of St Peter More images
Church of St Peter	Windrush	Anglican church	12th century	26 January 1961	SP193130; 51°48′56″N 1°43′16″W	1090415	Church of St Peter More images
Church of St Bartholomew	Winstone	Parish church	Mid–late 11th century	26 November 1958	SO965093; 51°46′59″N 2°03′05″W	1088409	Church of St Bartholomew More images
Church of St Michael	Withington	Parish church	12th century	26 January 1961	SP031156; 51°50′21″N 1°57′22″W	1302954	Church of St Michael More images
Church of St Leonard	Stowell Park, Yanworth	Church	12th century	26 January 1961	SP087130; 51°48′58″N 1°52′28″W	1154236	Church of St Leonard More images

== See also ==
- Grade I listed buildings in Gloucestershire
  - Grade I listed buildings in Cheltenham
  - Grade I listed buildings in Forest of Dean
  - Grade I listed buildings in Gloucester
  - Grade I listed buildings in South Gloucestershire
  - Grade I listed buildings in Stroud (district)
  - Grade I listed buildings in Tewkesbury (borough)
- Grade II* listed buildings in Cotswold (district)
