= Church of St Andrew, Eastleach Turville =

Church in Gloucestershire, England

Coordinates: 51.7465°N 1.7087°W

Church of St Andrew
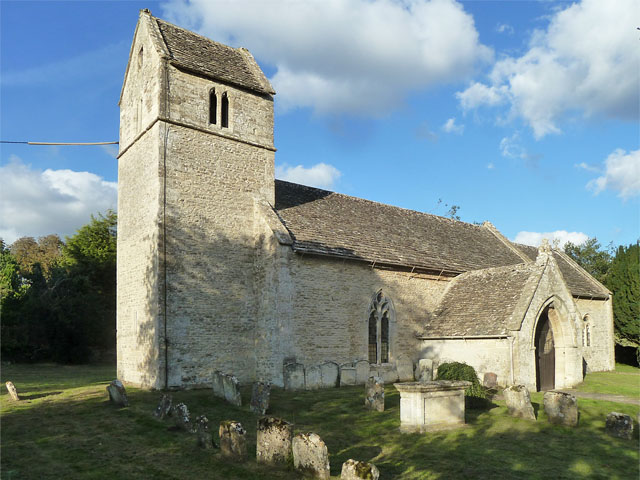

- Denomination: Church of England

Architecture
- Heritage designation: Grade I listed building
- Designated: 26 Jan 1961

Administration
- Province: Canterbury
- Diocese: Gloucester
- Benefice: South Cotswold Team Ministry

The Anglican Church of St Andrew at Eastleach Turville in the Cotswold District of Gloucestershire, England, was built in the 12th century. It is a grade I listed building.

== History ==
The nave, north wall and arch of the chancel were built in the 12th century. In the 13th a north aisle and tower were added. Various restorations and revisions were carried out in the 17th to 19th centuries and the three-bay hammerbeam roof was replaced in 1906 or 1909 in elm.

John Keble was the curate of this church and the neighbouring St Michael and St Martin's Church in 1815. The Keble family had been lords of the manor for generations.

The parish is part of the South Cotswold Team Ministry benefice within the Diocese of Gloucester.

== Architecture ==
The limestone building has stone slate roofs. It consists of a chancel, nave with north transept and a west tower.

The saddleback tower was added in the late 12th or early 13th century. It contains two bells which were recast by Rudhall of Gloucester in 1789.

The Norman doorway, which dates from around 1130, has a carved tympanum with Christ in Majesty in the centre with angels on either side. This is surrounded by enriched chevron mouldings.

The octagonal font was carved in the 15th century and the hexagonal pulpit with its carved panels is Jacobean. The parish chest is from 1678.
