= Church of St Peter, Willersey =

Church in Gloucestershire, England

Coordinates: 52.0552°N 1.84536°W

Church of St Peter
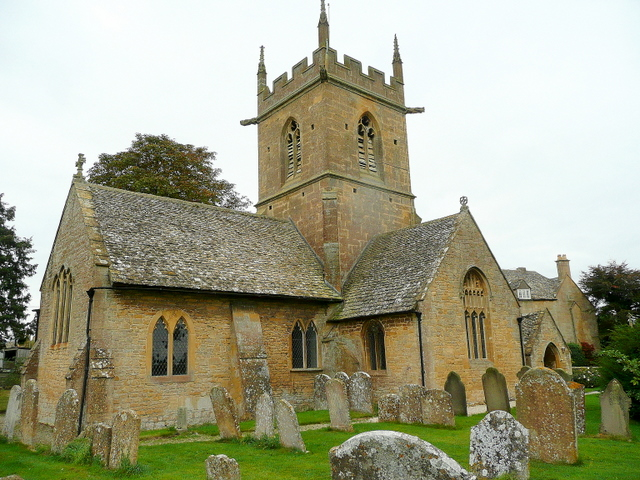

- Denomination: Church of England

Architecture
- Heritage designation: Grade I listed building
- Designated: 25 August 1960

Administration
- Province: Canterbury
- Diocese: Gloucester

The Anglican Church of St Peter at Willersey in the Cotswold District of Gloucestershire, England, was built in the 12th century. It is a grade I listed building. St Peter's has a fifteenth-century bell tower with traditional pinnacles and gargoyles.

== History ==
The church nave was built in the 12th century. In the 13th the aisle was rebuilt and a porch added. The tower was added in the 15th century.

In the 14th and 15th centuries the church was expanded by the Abbots of Evesham who had their summer residence in Willersey.

The six bells within the tower were cast in 1712 from three earlier bells by Rudhall of Gloucester.

A major refurbishment costing £100,000 was completed in 2017.

The parish of Willersey with Saintbury is part of the Vale and Cotswold Edge benefice within the Diocese of Gloucester.

== Architecture ==
The limestone building consists of the nave, chancel, transept and two-stage tower.

The font is Norman, and a piscina from the 14th century.
