= Tetbury Market House =

Municipal building in Tetbury, Gloucestershire, England

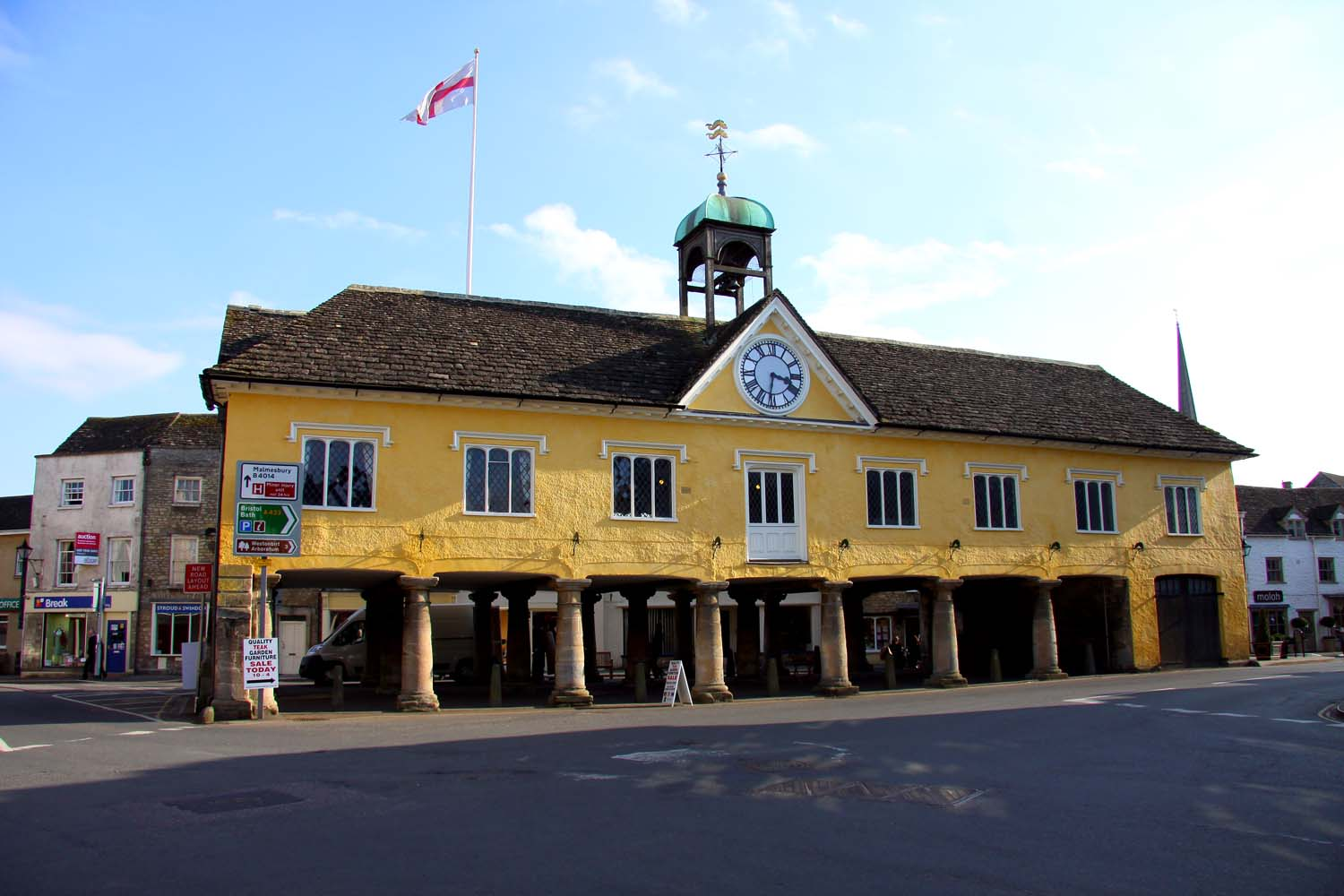
- Tetbury Market House

- Shown in Gloucestershire
- 51.6368°N 2.1594°W
- Location: Market Place, Tetbury

History
- Built: 1655

Site notes
- Architectural style: Neoclassical style

Listed Building – Grade I
- Official name: Market House
- Designated: 6 September 1954
- Reference no.: 1303914

Tetbury Market House, also known as Tetbury Town Hall, is a municipal building in the Market Place, Tetbury, Gloucestershire, England. The building, which was used both as a market house and as a town hall until the late 19th century, is a Grade I listed building.

== History ==
The current building was commissioned by the local feoffees to replace a medieval market house: the new building was designed in the neoclassical style, built with a timber frame and a stucco finish and was completed in 1655. The design involved a symmetrical main frontage with seven bays facing onto the Market Place; it was arcaded on the ground floor, so that wool and yarn markets could be held, with an assembly room on the first floor. On the ground floor, there were three rows of seven Tuscan order columns which supported the first floor, which was fenestrated by two-light mullioned windows and surmounted by a central pediment with a clock in the tympanum.

The building was extended by an extra bay to the south sometime in the 18th century. The south elevation featured a stone staircase leading up to a first-floor doorway with a keystone and a hood mould. The staircase was flanked by small doorways on the ground floor and by two-light mullioned windows on the first floor, and there was a central pediment with a clock in the tympanum on this side as well. Internally, the principal room was the assembly room on the first floor which featured a central row of wooden Ionic order columns.

In the 18th century, the assembly hall on the first floor was used by the feoffees as a town hall and as a courtroom for the manorial court hearings. In 1817, alterations were carried out to a design by William Porter: these included the infilling of the south bay to create accommodation for a horse-drawn fire engine and the removal of an extra floor on the east side of the building.

The assembly room continued to be used as a courthouse, and part of the ground floor continued to be used as a lock-up for the incarceration of petty criminals, until a purpose-built courthouse and police station was erected in Long Street in 1884. A cupola with an ogee-shaped copper roof and a weather vane depicting dolphins was erected on the roof to celebrate the Golden Jubilee of Queen Victoria in 1887. The feoffees continued to administer the town from the assembly room until Tetbury Urban District Council was formed in 1894. The assembly room was subsequently used as a classroom for the teaching of technical subjects and ground floor continued to be used as the venue for markets on Wednesdays.

The annual Tetbury Food and Drink Festival, held in September each year with a farmers style market in the market hall, was first held in September 2007. The Prince of Wales and Duchess of Cornwall stood outside the market hall to turn on the Christmas lights in December 2012.

== See also ==
- Grade I listed buildings in Cotswold (district)
