= Ampney Park =

16th-century building in Gloucestershire, England

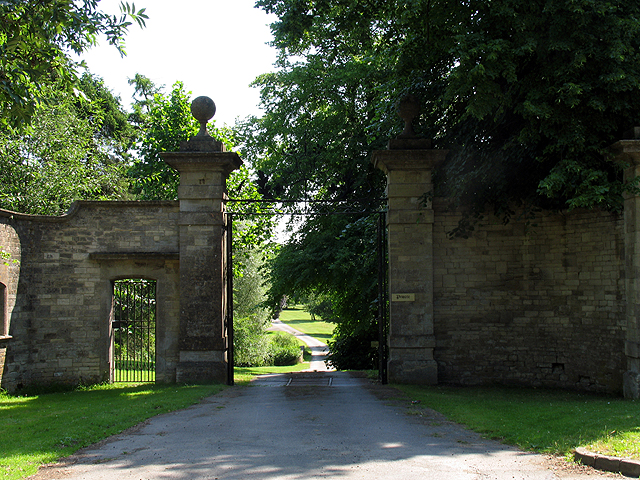
- Entrance to Ampney Park

- Location within Gloucestershire
- 51.7168°N 1.9148°W
- Location: Ampney Crucis, Gloucestershire, England

History
- Built: Late 16th century

Listed Building – Grade II
- Official name: Ampney Park
- Designated: 4 June 1952
- Reference no.: 1090018

Listed Building – Grade II
- Official name: The Lodge, Ampney Park
- Designated: 4 June 1952
- Reference no.: 1305297

Ampney Park is a 16th-century manor house at Ampney Crucis, Cotswolds, in Gloucestershire, England. It is a Grade II-listed building.

== History ==
The estate is attached to the Church of the Holy Rood and lies on Ampney Brook within the area known as the Cotswold Water Park.

The house was built in the late 16th century by John Pleydell. Additions and extensions to the house were carried out in the 18th and 19th centuries. The lodge was built in the mid-17th century and the rear wing was added in 1893. It is now a collection of Jacobean, Georgian and Victorian architecture.

In 1724, the house passed into the family of Viscount Downe of Cowick Hall in Yorkshire. They sold it to Samuel Blackwell in 1765, and his family owned it until 1891. The house was next owned by the Cripps family until 1959, having been bought by Edmund Cripps in the 1890s. Edmund Cripps extended the house including the addition of a billiard room with stained-glass windows depicting the arms of the Cripps, Radcliffe and Brydges families. In the 1960s, the house was used as accommodation for students from the agricultural college in Cirencester (now the Royal Agricultural University) and subsequently redeveloped.

It was a private house until it was turned into a hotel in 1982, before returning to private use. In 1997, the house and estate were bought by businessman Edward Scott and his wife.

== Architecture ==
The stone building has stone slate roofs. The original two-storey block has attic rooms beneath the cornice. The interior includes rooms with oak panels, moulded plaster ceilings and stone fireplaces. The house includes nine bedrooms a gym and an indoor swimming pool.

The 25.5 acres (10.3 ha) grounds were laid out with terracing near the house and the parterre and croquet lawn. There are multiple sculptures. It also has a lake and water gardens. There is also a tennis court. Outbuildings have been converted into a riding school, including seven loose boxes and a sand school.
