= Church of St Mary the Virgin, Syde =

Church in Gloucestershire, England

Coordinates: 51.7961°N 2.0751°W

Church of St Mary the Virgin
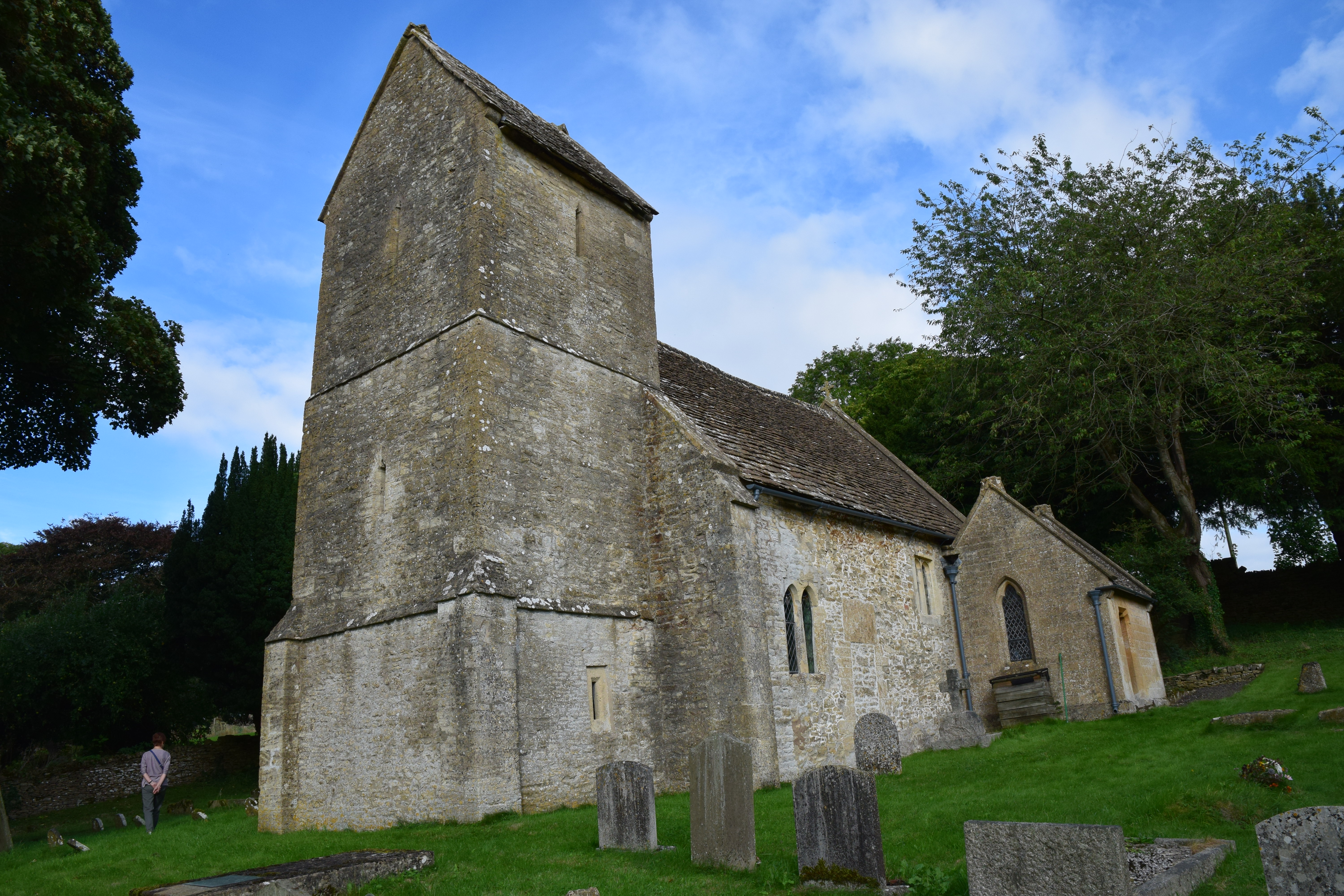

- Denomination: Church of England

Architecture
- Heritage designation: Grade I listed building
- Designated: 26 November 1958

Administration
- Province: Canterbury
- Diocese: Gloucester
- Benefice: Ermin West

The Anglican Church of St Mary the Virgin at Syde in the Cotswold District of Gloucestershire, England, was built in the early 12th century. It is a grade I listed building.

== History ==
The Norman church was built on the site of an earlier Saxon one, from which some fabric, including the lintel over the south doorway, have been incorporated into the current building.

The saddleback tower was added in the 14th century. The chancel was restored in 1850.

The parish is part of the Ermin West benefice within the Diocese of Gloucester.

== Architecture ==
The limestone building has stone slate roofs. It consists of a nave, chancel, porch and vestry and west tower. The nave has a crown post roof. The three-stage saddleback tower has three bells hung by Rudhall of Gloucester. Two are from the 14th century and the other from 1771.

The 15th century font sits on a stem with five chamfered faces. The 18th century box pews remain in situ and there is some 15th century stained glass depicting James the Great.
