= Church of St Bartholomew, Winstone =

Church in Gloucestershire, England

Coordinates: 51.7830°N 2.0513°W

Church of St Bartholomew
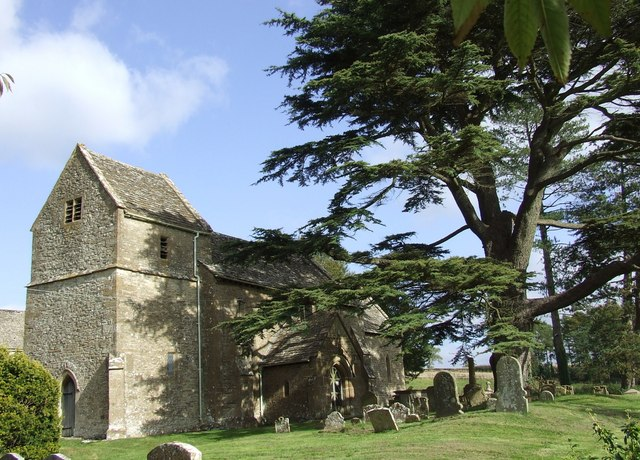

- Denomination: Church of England

Architecture
- Heritage designation: Grade I listed building
- Designated: 26 November 1968

Administration
- Province: Canterbury
- Diocese: Gloucester

The Anglican Church of St Bartholomew at Winstone in the Cotswold District of Gloucestershire, England, was built in the 11th century. It is a grade I listed building.

== History ==
The nave was built in the 11th century with the south porch being added in the 14th and the tower in the 15th.

In 1876 the church underwent Victorian restoration by Frederick S. Waller and further restoration was carried out in the 1950s and 1960s.

The parish is part of a benefice centred on Brimpsfield within the Diocese of Gloucester.

== Architecture ==
The limestone building has a stone slate roof. It consists of a nave, chancel, south porch and a north vestry. The two-stage saddleback west tower has six bells including one dating from 1320.

An Anglo-Saxon door, with a tympanum over it, is now blocked up.

Inside the church is a 15th-century octagonal font.
