= Church of St Mary, Ampney St Mary =

Church in Gloucestershire, England

Coordinates: 51.7125°N 1.8919°W

Church of St Mary
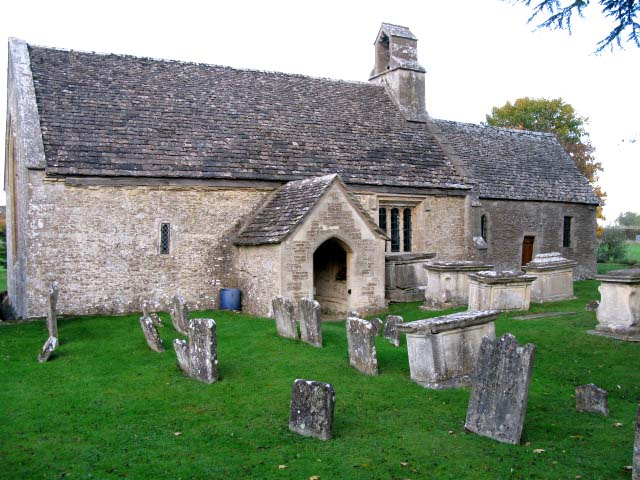

- Denomination: Church of England

Architecture
- Heritage designation: Grade I listed building
- Designated: 26 November 1958

Administration
- Province: Canterbury
- Diocese: Gloucester
- Parish: The Ampneys

The Anglican Church of St Mary at Ampney St Mary in the Cotswold District of Gloucestershire, England, was built in the 12th and 13th centuries. It is a grade I listed building.

== History ==
The nave was built in the early 12th century with the chancel being added in the 13th.

The village was abandoned after the black death, and the church unused from 1879. It was discovered and restored in 1913.

== Architecture ==
The stone building has a slate roof with a bellcote. The nave is supported by buttresses. The nave and chancel have wagon roofs from the 14th century and wall paintings from the same period.

Above the doorway is a stone lintel carved with a lion, two headed serpent and griffin.

The font is Norman.
