= Church of St Michael, Brimpsfield =

Coordinates: 51.8141°N 2.0855°W

Church of St Michael
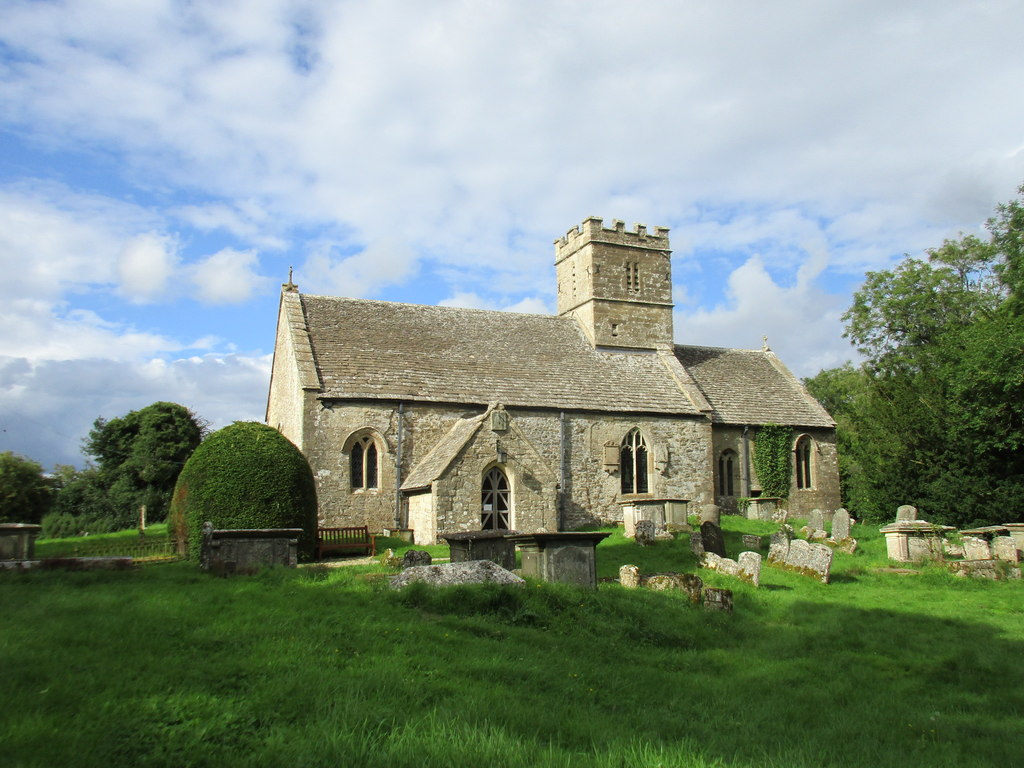

- Denomination: Church of England

Architecture
- Heritage designation: Grade I listed building
- Designated: 26 November 1958

Administration
- Province: Canterbury
- Diocese: Gloucester
- Parish: Brimpsfield

The Anglican Church of St Michael at Brimpsfield in the Cotswold District of Gloucestershire, England was built in 12th century. It is a grade I listed building.

== History ==
The church was first constructed in the 12th century with the chancel being added in the 13th. The tower was built in the 15th century.

The church belonged to a convent at Fontenay in France and then Eton College.

Between 1833 and 1883 the church had a west gallery.

The parish and benefice are now part of the Diocese of Gloucester.

== Architecture ==
The limestone building has stone slate roofs. It consists of a nave, chancel, vestry and porch with a tower at the eastern end. On the well of the south doorway is a mass dial. The tower holds six bells. One of the bells is from the 15th century and another from the 16th.

Inside the church is an octagonal pulpit from 1658.
