= Hampnett =

Coordinates: 51°50′25″N 1°51′20″W

- Village
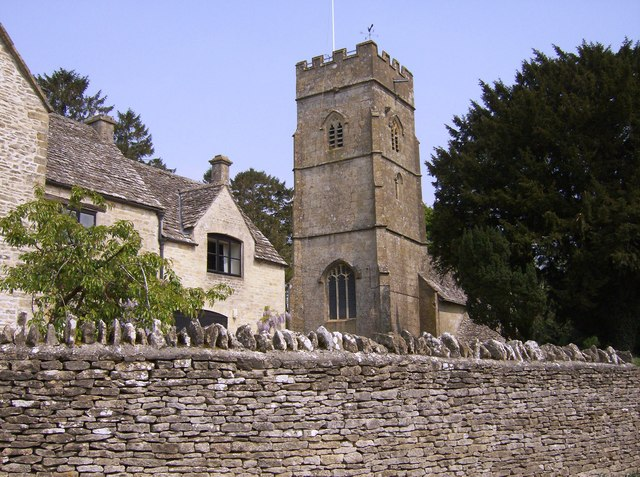
- Hampnett church

- Location within Gloucestershire
- OS grid reference: SP100157
- District: Cotswold
- Shire county: Gloucestershire
- Region: South West
- Country: England
- Sovereign state: United Kingdom
- Post town: Cheltenham
- Postcode district: GL54
- Dialling code: 01451
- Police: Gloucestershire
- Fire: Gloucestershire
- Ambulance: South Western
- UK Parliament: North Cotswolds

Hampnett is a small village and civil parish in Gloucestershire, England, just west of the Fosse Way. It is situated west of the junction of the A40 and A429 roads in the Cotswolds Area of Outstanding Natural Beauty. A number of springs in the village form the source of the River Leach.

== Etymology ==
The name Hampnett is first attested in the Domesday Book of 1086 as Hantone. This name derives from the Old English words hēah ('high') and tūn ('estate, farmstead'), and thus meant 'high farmstead'. The name is first attested with the addition of the Anglo-Norman diminutive suffix -et in 1213, as Hamtonett.

== History ==
There is some evidence of Roman settlement in the area: a bronze statue of Hercules, now in the Cheltenham museum, was found during excavations in the parish. In 1086, Domesday Book listed 25 tenants in the parish including a priest, at which time it was held by Eldred, Archbishop of York, who had bought it from Earl Godwin in 1061.

=== St George's Church ===
The parish church of St George is a 12th-century Norman church built c. 1125. Until around 1740 it was dedicated to St Matthew. Between 1868 and 1871, the incumbent, Rev W Wiggins, had the interior walls stencilled in a colourful medieval style. This was not appreciated by the parishioners who attempted to raise money to have it whitewashed but failed to raise the required amount. It is a Grade I listed building.

== Amenities ==
The nearest shops are in the market town of Northleach, 1 mi (1.6 km) to the south-east. A once-a-week bus service runs to a supermarket in Cirencester.
