= Church of St Mary, Edgeworth =

Church in Gloucestershire, England

Coordinates: 51.7523°N 2.0763°W

Church of St Mary
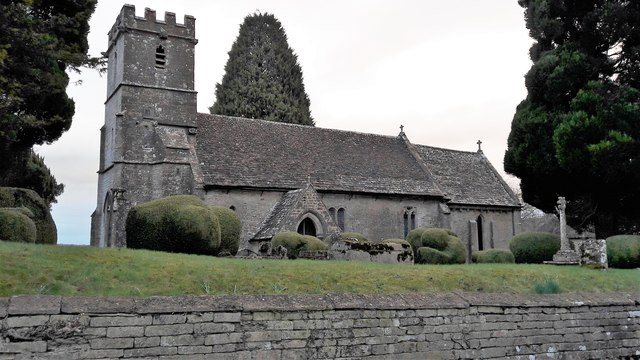

- Denomination: Church of England

Architecture
- Heritage designation: Grade I listed building
- Designated: 26 November 1958

Administration
- Province: Canterbury
- Diocese: Gloucester
- Benefice: Ermin West

The Anglican Church of St Mary in Edgeworth, Gloucestershire, England, was built in 11th century. It is a grade I listed building.

== History ==
The building was originally Saxon but has been revised and expanded many times. In the 12th century the chancel was added and the tower in the 14th.

A major Victorian restoration removed some of the Romanesque architecture in the interior of the church.

Several species of bats have been identified in the church.

== Architecture ==
The limestone building has stone slate roofs. It consists of a nave, chancel, south porch and west tower. The tower has a sundial and many gargoyles and grotesques.

Most of the internal furnishing is from the 19th century, but there is a font and some of the bench ends from the 15th century. There are also remnants of 14th-century stained glass.
