= Church of St Lawrence, Bourton-on-the-Hill =

Church in Gloucestershire, England

Coordinates: 51.9908°N 1.7461°W

Church of St Lawrence
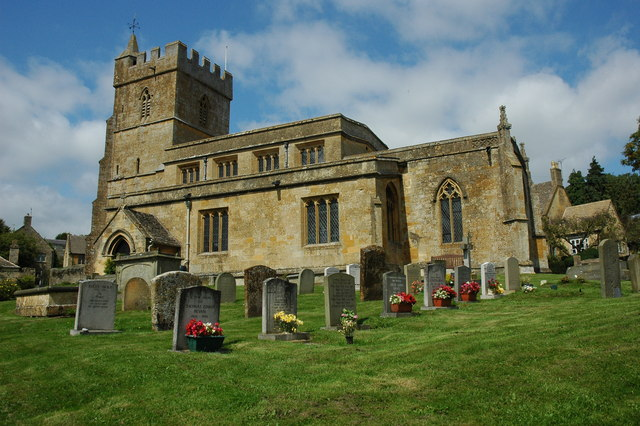

- Denomination: Church of England

Architecture
- Heritage designation: Grade I listed building
- Designated: 25 August 1960

Administration
- Province: Canterbury
- Diocese: Gloucester
- Parish: Bourton-on-the-Hill

The Anglican Church of St Lawrence at Bourton-on-the-Hill in the Cotswold District of Gloucestershire, England, was built in the 12th century. It is a grade I listed building.

== History ==
The nave of the church was built in the 12th century with the chancel being added in the 14th.

The church was previously dedicated to St Mary but this was changed to St Lawrence in the 15th century.

The stone screen was installed in 1927.

The parish is part of the Vale and Cotswold Edge benefice within the Diocese of Gloucester.

== Architecture ==
The limestone building consists of the nave which has north and south aisles; chancel and north and south porches. There is a tower at the west end is supported by diagonal buttresses. The tower contains six bells, the oldest of which was cast in 1677. The south porch includes two scratch dials.

Inside the church are a 14th-century piscina and 15th century octagonal font. There are also several monuments and memorials.
