= Church of St James, Coln St. Dennis =

Church in Gloucestershire, England

Coordinates: 51.7970°N 1.8768°W

Church of St James
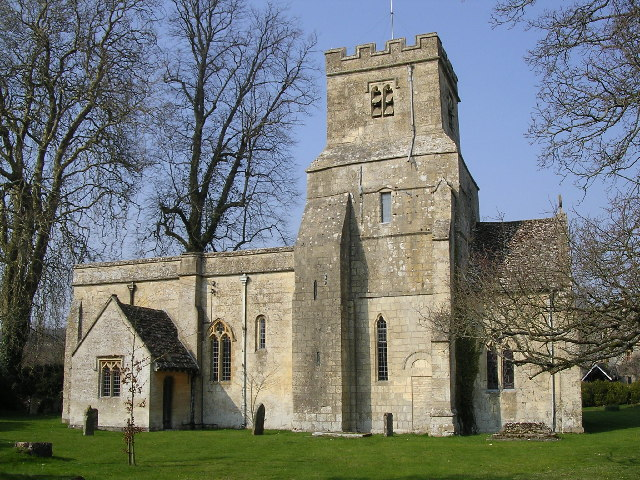

- Denomination: Church of England

Architecture
- Heritage designation: Grade I listed building
- Designated: 26 January 1961

Administration
- Province: Canterbury
- Diocese: Gloucester
- Benefice: Chedworth Yanworth and Stowell Coln Rogers and Coln St Dennis

The Anglican Church of St James at Coln St. Dennis in the Cotswold District of Gloucestershire, England, was built in the 12th century. It is a grade I listed building.

== History ==
The Church of England parish church is dedicated to Saint James the Great. The church was dedicated to Saint Katherine in the 13th century, Saint Dennis in the 18th century, and is believed to have once been dedicated to Saint Kenelm. During the 18th century it may have briefly been dedicated to St Dennis.

The central tower had a belfry added in the 15th century. This was rebuilt in 1904 as part of a wider restoration by William Weir the architect for the Society for the Protection of Ancient Buildings.

The parish is part of the Chedworth Yanworth and Stowell Coln Rogers and Coln St Dennis benefice within the Diocese of Gloucester.

== Architecture ==
The building is Norman, with the addition of some Decorated Gothic and Perpendicular Gothic windows and other details. The limestone building has a stone slate roof. It consists of a chancel and nave with a central tower.

The octagonal font is from the 12th century as is the piscina in the chancel. There are wooden panels in the church. One listing survivors from the village during World War I and another listing those who died in World War I and World War II.
