= Doughton Manor =

Listed building in Gloucestershire

Coordinates: 51°37′19″N 2°10′31″W

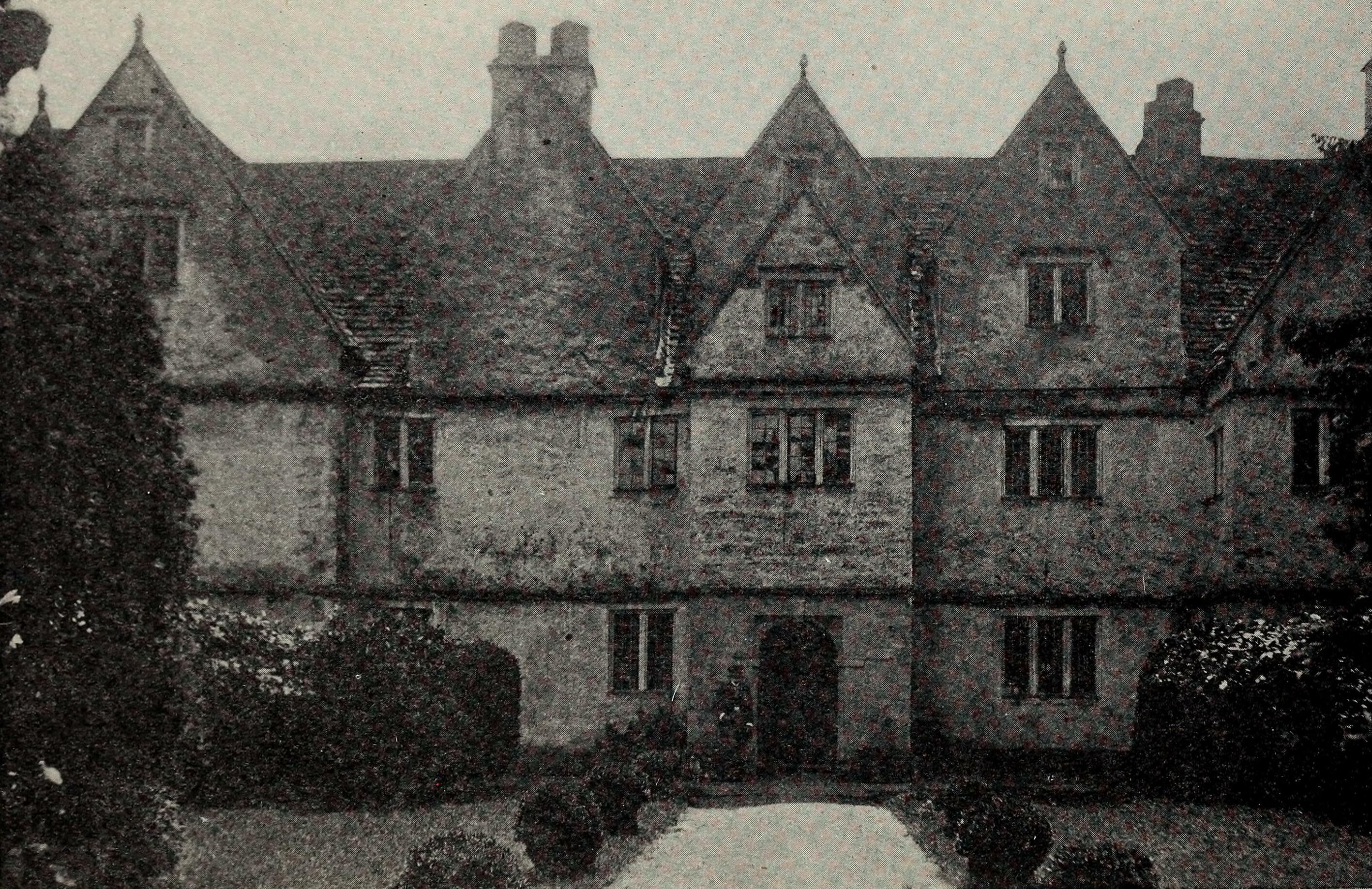
Doughton Manor, photographed in 1914

Doughton Manor is a country house in Doughton, in the civil parish of Tetbury Upton, in the Cotswold district of Gloucestershire, England. It is recorded in the National Heritage List for England as a designated Grade I listed building.

The listed building specification indicates that Richard Talboys built the house between 1628 and 1641, and it was restored in 1933. More recent research suggests Doughton Manor was built around the year 1590 by John Seed before Richard Talboys acquired the property in 1623. Talboys was long considered responsible for the original construction and he certainly worked on the building between 1628 and 1641, altering and aggrandising it. Although the house was restored in 1933, it remains one of the least altered Cotswold Manor houses.

Doughton Manor is adjacent to Highgrove House, the family residence of King Charles III and Queen Camilla. The house was offered for sale in 2022 at a price of £4 million.
