= Church of St Nicholas, Saintbury =

Church in Gloucestershire, England

Coordinates: 52.0533°N 1.8306°W

Church of St Nicholas
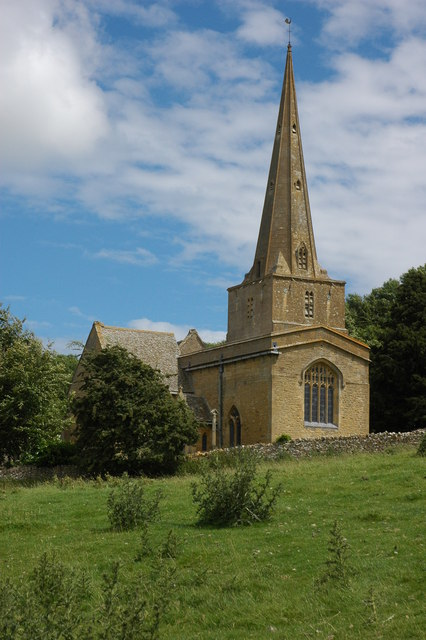

- Location within Gloucestershire
- Denomination: Church of England

Architecture
- Heritage designation: Grade I listed building
- Designated: 25 August 1960

Administration
- Province: Canterbury
- Diocese: Gloucester

The Anglican Church of St Nicholas at Saintbury in the Cotswold District of Gloucestershire, England, was built in the 13th century. It is a grade I listed building.

== History ==
Parts of the current building, including the nave, north transept and tower, date from the 13th century but some aspects, such as the Norman south door with tympanum, provide evidence of an earlier church on the site. The north door is also Norman and above it is a circular Anglo-Saxon tide dial. The chancel was added in the 14th century.

The last service was held in the church in 2009 and it is now in the care of the Churches Conservation Trust. The lead from the roof was stolen in 2017.

== Architecture ==
The limestone building has stone slate roofs. It consists of a nave which a north transept and porch, chancel and tower. The spire above the tower can be seen for miles on the Cotswold escarpment.

A stone carving on the wall of the church has been suggested to be a Sheela na gig.

The interior includes box pews and wall paintings, with some Arts and Crafts features, by Ernest Gimson, Alec Miller and Charles Robert Ashbee, which were added in the early 20th century. The octagonal font and altar rails are from the 15th or 16th century. The double piscina is thought to date from the reign of Edward I. The wall paintings depicting passages from the King James Bible date from 1634.

== See also ==
- List of churches preserved by the Churches Conservation Trust in the English Midlands
