= Winstone =

Village in Gloucestershire, England

Coordinates: 51°47′6″N 2°3′25″W

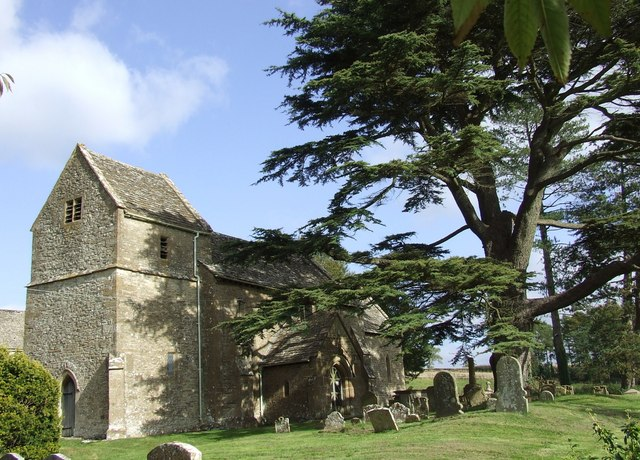
- Winstone Church

- Location within Gloucestershire
- Population: 270 (2011 Census)
- District: Cotswold
- Shire county: Gloucestershire
- Region: South West
- Country: England
- Sovereign state: United Kingdom
- Police: Gloucestershire
- Fire: Gloucestershire
- Ambulance: South Western
- UK Parliament: North Cotswolds

Winstone is a village and civil parish in the English county of Gloucestershire. The population taken at the 2011 census was 270.

Winstone forms part of the Cotswold District.

The Anglican Church of St Bartholomew was built in the 11th century. It is a grade I listed building.

Winstone Baptist Chapel dates from about 1816.

== Winstone radio station ==
The Winstone radio station had several masts established by the Air Ministry in the north-east of the parish during the Second World War. From 1971 the site was also used for air traffic control, with a transmitter mast operated by NATS Holdings about half a mile north-east of the village.
