= Church of the Holy Rood, Daglingworth =

Coordinates: 51.7435°N 2.0109°W

Church of the Holy Rood
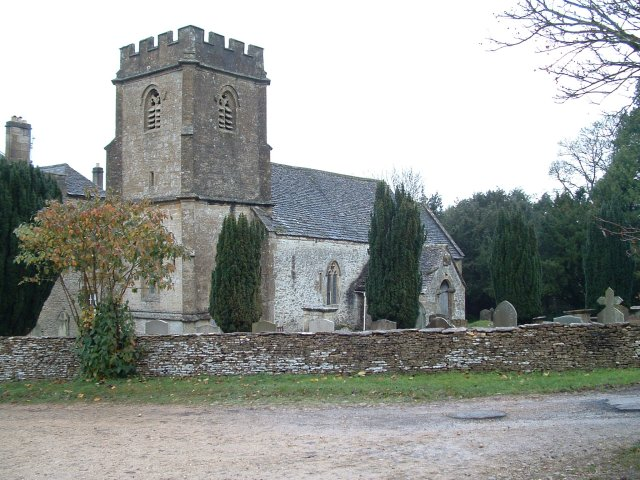

- Denomination: Church of England

Architecture
- Heritage designation: Grade I listed building
- Designated: 26 November 1958

Administration
- Province: Canterbury
- Diocese: Gloucester
- Benefice: Ermin West

The Anglican Church of the Holy Rood at Daglingworth in the Cotswold District of Gloucestershire, England was built in the 11th century. It is a Grade I listed building.

== History ==
The church was built in the 11th century and extended, including the tower, in the 15th. A Victorian restoration, between 1845 and 1850, included the addition of the north aisle and rebuilding the chancel.

== Architecture ==
The limestone building had stone slate roofs. It consists of a nave with south porch, chancel, north aisle and west tower. The tower contains four bells, the oldest of which date from 1720.

The nave was divided by a cross wall, with a loft for the priest above, but this was removed in the 19th century. There is an organ above the chancel arch.

A series of Saxon carvings, including one of the crucifixion, were rediscovered during rebuilding work in 1850. They predate the Norman Conquest and follow the Syrian tradition. They are dated to around 1050. The carvings were originally built into the chancel arch and are now in the nave.

The previous altar is Romanesque, and now used as a credence table. The font is from the 15th century, and includes a carving of the Green Man. The south porch was built in the 15th century and contains a Saxon sundial.

In the churchyard the remains of steps and shaft of a medieval cross can be seen.
