= Church of St Andrew, Cold Aston =

Church in Gloucestershire, England

Coordinates: 51.8776°N 1.8156°W

Church of St Andrew
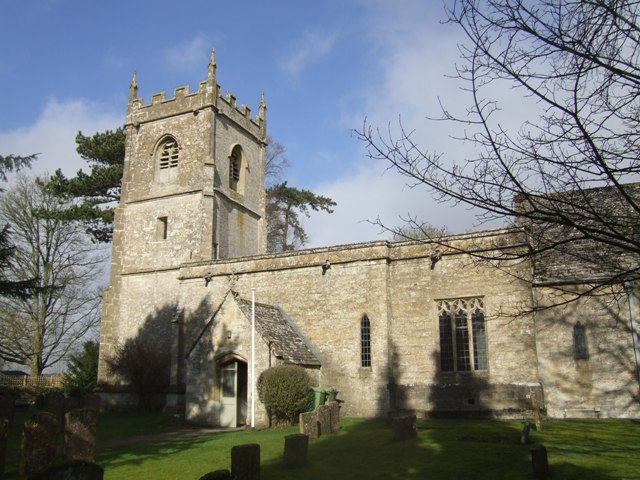

- Denomination: Church of England

Architecture
- Heritage designation: Grade I listed building
- Designated: 26 January 1961

Administration
- Province: Canterbury
- Diocese: Gloucester
- Archdeaconry: Cheltenham
- Deanery: North Cotswold
- Benefice: Northleach with Hampnett & Farmington, Cold Aston

The Anglican St Andrew's Church at Cold Aston in the Cotswold District of Gloucestershire, England, was built in the 12th century. It is a grade I listed building.

The Church of England parish church is a Norman church dedicated to St Andrew. Its walls incorporate Saxon stonework and the original church on this site may have been built in around AD 904. David Verey an expert of local architectural history refers approvingly to the "very good" west tower of three stages and other Perpendicular elements of the church, commenting, "All is evidently the work of the best Cotswold masons, and is the fifteenth-century aggrandizement of a Norman church". Much of the present church was restored in 1875.

== History ==
The building was constructed in the 12th century on the site of an earlier church which may have been built in 904. Some of the Saxon stonework has been incorporated into the current fabric of the church.

The church was dedicated to St Mary in the 16th century but was changed to St Andrew by the 18th century. Restoration and repair was carried out in 1820 and the chancel arch rebuilt before 1857. In 1876 a more extensive Victorian restoration was carried out by J. E. K. Cutts.

The parish is part of the benefice of Northleach with Hampnett & Farmington, Cold Aston within the Diocese of Gloucester.

== Architecture ==
The limestone Perpendicular building has a stone slate roof. It consists of a nave, chancel, and porch with a west tower. The tower contains a ring of 5 bells, three of which were cast in 1717.

There are the remains of an Early English pillar piscina in the south wall, while most of the fittings and stained glass are from the 19th century. There is an Easter sepulchre in the north wall.

Within the church is a memorial plaque to villagers who died in World War I and II.
