= Church of St Lawrence, Mickleton =

Church in Gloucestershire, England

Coordinates: 52.0896°N 1.7651°W

Church of St Lawrence
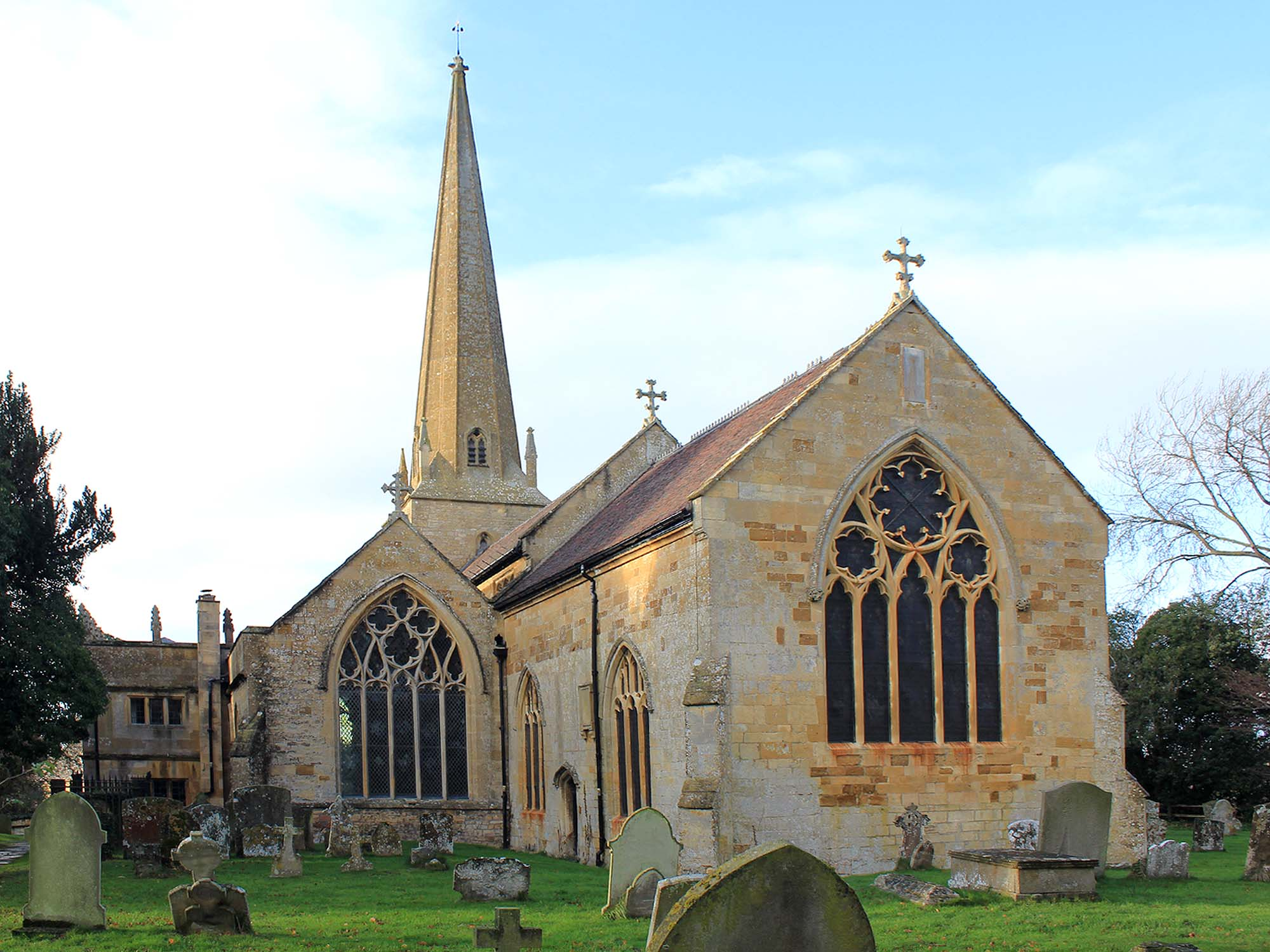

- Denomination: Church of England
- Website: www.stjameschurchcampden.co.uk/mickletonparish.htm

Architecture
- Heritage designation: Grade I listed building
- Designated: 25 August 1960

Administration
- Province: Canterbury
- Diocese: Gloucester
- Benefice: Vale and Cotswold Edge

The Anglican Church of St Lawrence at Mickleton in the Cotswold District of Gloucestershire, England, was built in the 12th century. It is a grade I listed building.

== History ==
There is some evidence of a church in Mickleton by 960 but the current building was started in the 12th century. The nave was extended in the 13th or 14th century and in the 14th century the tower was added. A Victorian restoration was carried out by Frederick Preedy in 1868.

The parish is part of the Vale and Cotswold Edge benefice within the Diocese of Gloucester.

== Architecture ==
The stone building has a tiled roof.

The tower has eight bells the oldest of which date from 1668. An attempt has been made to date the bellframe using tree-ring analysis however this was inconclusive. They were rehung in 1954 in an iron frame.

A sundial over the door of the south porch with a Latin inscription. The organ dates from 1853 but the organ loft was added in 1931.

The church contains a memorial to Utrecia Smith, the daughter of a curate of Mickleton whose father was also a schoolmaster. Utrecia had been the fiancée of the writer Richard Graves (who broke off their engagement); she died in 1744 aged 30. There is also a memorial plaque to residents of the village who died in World War I.

The pulpit is Jacobean and the font from the 15th century. Most of the stained glass is from the 19th century.
