= Church of the Holy Rood, Ampney Crucis =

Church in Gloucestershire, England

Church of the Holy Rood
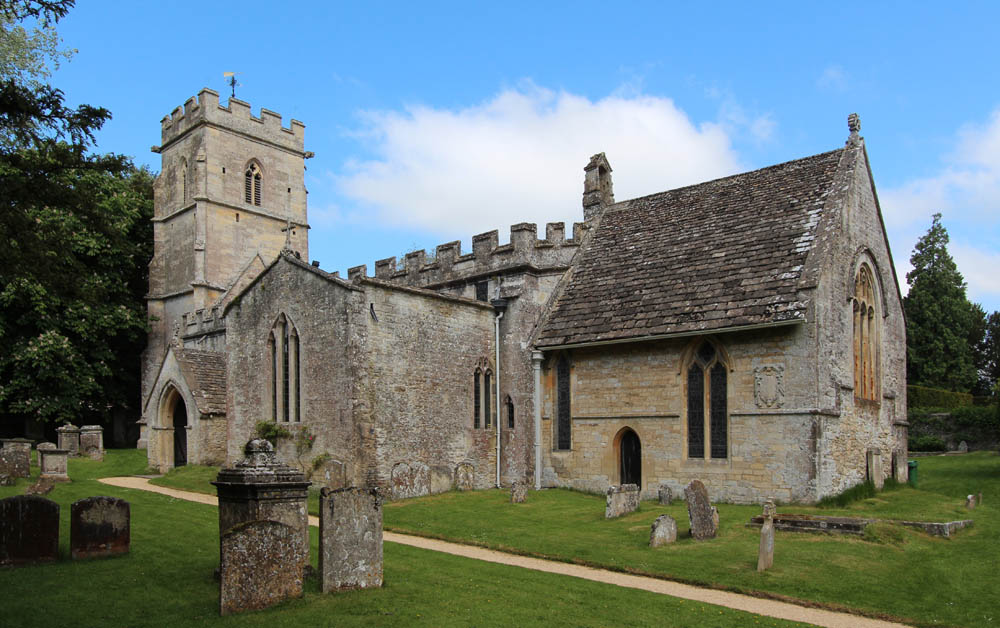

- 51.7157°N 1.9073°W
- Denomination: Church of England

Architecture
- Heritage designation: Grade I listed building
- Designated: 26 November 1958

Administration
- Province: Canterbury
- Diocese: Gloucester
- Parish: Ampney Crucis

The Anglican Church of the Holy Rood at Ampney Crucis in the Cotswold District of Gloucestershire, England, has Saxon foundations with some of the stonework being Norman. It is a grade I listed building. The listing summary describes it as an "Anglican parish church. Saxon foundation, with some Norman work and elements from all periods including C15 tower and re-roofing of nave, up to restoration of 1870".

== History ==
In the Domesday Book (1086) the building is called the Church of Omenie Holy Rood since the name of the village at that time was Omenie, located in the Garsdon Hundred. The term "rood" is translated into English as "cross". Documents from 1287 refer to the church by its Latin name, Ameneye Sancte Crucis.

The foundations of the building date from the Saxon period and some aspects parts of the fabric of the building are Norman. Parts are more recent including the tower and the roof of the nave which are from the 15th century. The church was restored twice in the 19th century, including a Victorian restoration in 1870.

The church is attached to the estate of Ampney Park.

The parish is within the South Cotswold Team Ministry benefice which is part of the Diocese of Gloucester.

== Architecture ==
The limestone building with slate roofs. It has a cruciform plan of nave with porch and chancel with a north vestry. The west three-stage tower has gargoyles and is supported diagonal buttresses. The tower contains six bells.

Inside the church are some wall paintings from the 14th century, which are being restored by English Heritage. The tub-shape font is Norman but mounted on a modern octagonal base. There is also a 12th-century pillar piscina with a square multi-scallop bowl. There are tombs and memorials to local nobles from the 16th to 18th century. The tomb of George Lloyde from Ampney Park, who died in 1584, is in the north transept.

The organ was installed in the mid-19th century.

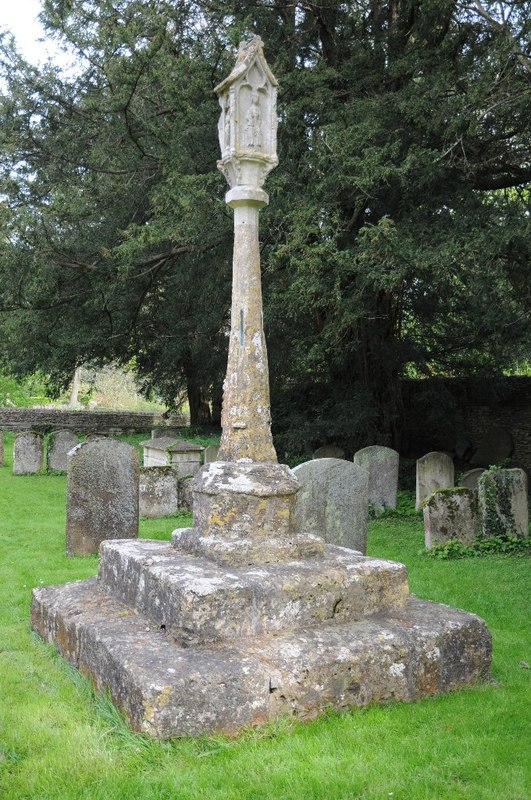
The cross in the churchyard, 2014

The cross in the churchyard was erected in 1415. Parts of it were stored in the church for many years and reinstalled on its base around 1860. The Grade I listed cross, and also a Scheduled Monument, is described as: "Late C14/early C15" ... The head was discovered in 1860 hidden in the old stair to the rood tower and replaced in its original position." The cross was restored in the late 20th century. The book Ancient Crosses by Marion Freeman states that during the Oliver Cromwell era (1650s), many villages removed their crosses, or at least the heads, in order to comply with the government's ruling.
