= Church of St Andrew, Coln Rogers =

Church in Gloucestershire, England

Coordinates: 51.7858°N 1.8746°W

Church of St Andrew
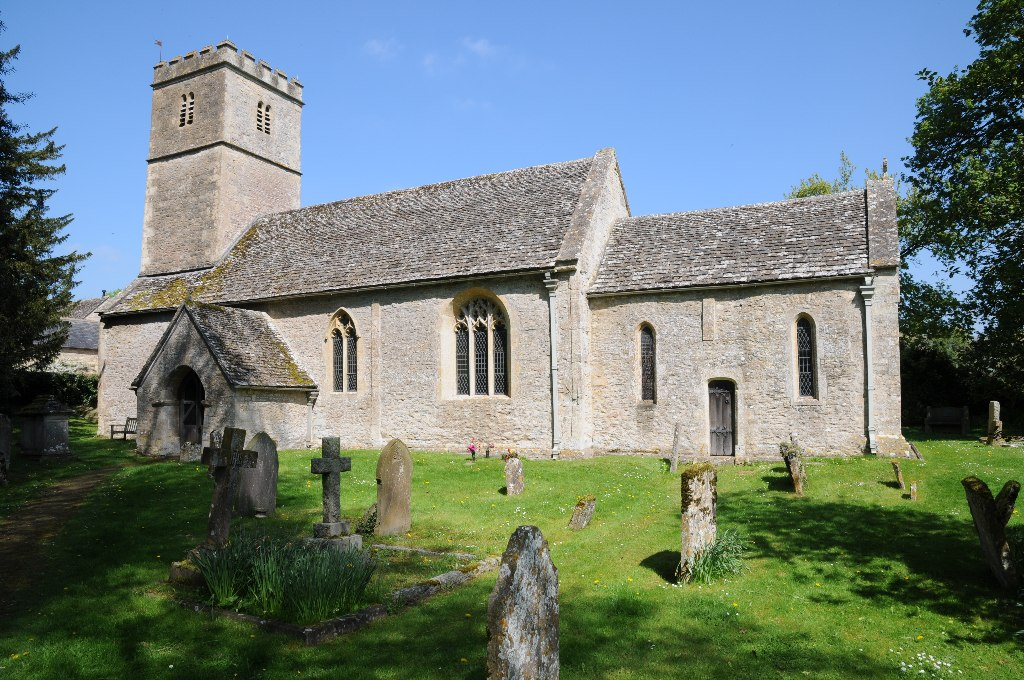

- Denomination: Church of England

Architecture
- Heritage designation: Grade I listed building

Administration
- Province: Canterbury
- Diocese: Gloucester

The Anglican Church of St Andrew at Coln Rogers in the Cotswold District of Gloucestershire, England, was built in the 11th century. It is a grade I listed building.

== History ==
The Saxon church was built in the 11th century and the layout is largely unchanged. The only variation is that the east wall of the chancel was rebuilt and the tower inserted.

A screen was put into the chancel arch before 1844, during alterations by Samuel Daukes and John Hamilton.

The parish is part of the Chedworth, Yanworth and Stowell, Coln Rogers benefice within the Diocese of Gloucester.

== Architecture ==
The limestone building consists of a nave and chancel, with a south porch and a west tower. The two-stage tower holds three bells the oldest of which dates from 1676.

The stone pulpit is from the 15th century, and the font Norman. There are traces of 15th-century stained glass in some windows of the nave.

A tablet within the church has the names of everyone from the village who served in the armed forces during World War I, all of whom survived, making it one of the Thankful Villages.
