= Church of St Bartholomew, Notgrove =

Church in Gloucestershire, England

Coordinates: 51.8779°N 1.8426°W

Church of St Bartholomew
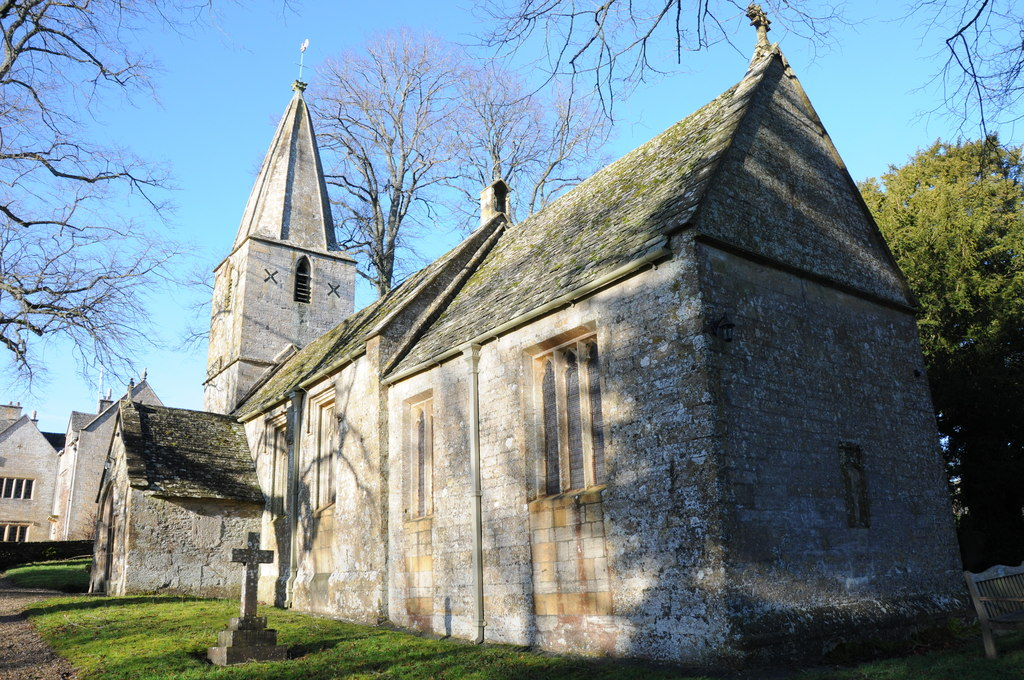

- Denomination: Church of England

Architecture
- Heritage designation: Grade I listed building

Administration
- Province: Canterbury
- Diocese: Gloucester

The Anglican Church of St Bartholomew at Notgrove in the Cotswold District of Gloucestershire, England, was built in the 12th century. It is a grade I listed building.

== History ==
The church was built in the 12th century with major revision and expansion in the 14th. It underwent Victorian restoration between 1871 and 1873.

It was dedicated to St Mary but this was changed in the 18th century to St Bartholomew.

The parish is part of the Northleach benefice within the Diocese of Gloucester.

== Architecture ==
The limestone building consists of a chancel with vestry, a nave with a north transept, and north aisle. The west tower has a spire.

On the south wall of the tower is a sundial with a ‘Fleur de lys’ design on the gnomon. The exterior wall of the chancel is a carving showing the crucifixion which is believed to date from the 14th century.

The interior of the church includes a 12th-century-font, 17th century pulpit and a chancel screen which 14th- or 15th-century carving. Some of the pews date back to the reign of Elizabeth I. Behind the altar is a 14th-century reredos which has been defaced at some time.

There is some old stained glass but most is made by Clayton and Bell in the Victorian era. Many effigies and tombs are of the Whittington family who were the Lord of the manor, including the descendants of Richard Whittington (Dick Whittington).
