= Church of St Peter, Farmington =

Church in Gloucestershire, England

Coordinates: 51.8359°N 1.8032°W

Church of St Peter
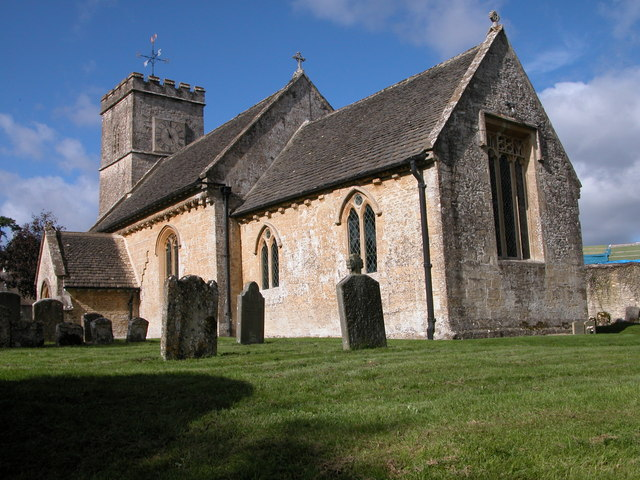

- Denomination: Church of England

Architecture
- Heritage designation: Grade I listed building
- Designated: 26 January 1961

Administration
- Province: Canterbury
- Diocese: Gloucester

The Anglican Church of St Peter at Farmington in the Cotswold District of Gloucestershire, England, was built in the 12th century. It is a grade I listed building.

== History ==
The church was built, with a nave and chancel, in the 12th century and the north aisle added in the 13th. The tower was built in the late 15th or early 16th century. It underwent Victorian restoration in 1890 and 1891.

The parish is part of the Northleach benefice within the Diocese of Gloucester.

== Architecture ==
The stone building consists of a nave, north aisle, a chancel with a vestry on the north side and a three-stage west tower. The bells in the tower were restored in 1902 in memory of Robert Drysdale who died in the Boer War.

The interior of the porch, chancel arch and arches in the three-bay nave are carved with chevron patterns. There is a 16th-century piscina in the chancel. The octagonal font dates from 1784.

Among the memorials in the church is one to the men of the village who died in World War I. In 2014 a new stained glass window, dedicated to Bishop Michael Mann and known as "Candles of Life", was opened by Princess Anne.

In the churchyard is the Waller family tomb, the Wallers having been the local dignitaries for several generations.
