= Church of St Mary, Icomb =

Church in Gloucestershire, England

Coordinates: 51.9018°N 1.6905°W

Church of St Mary
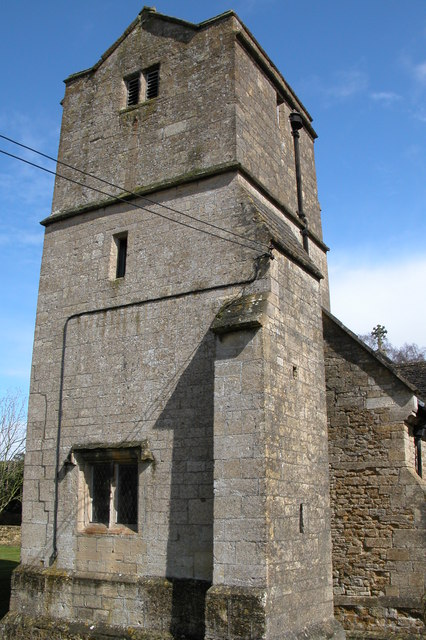

- Denomination: Church of England

Architecture
- Heritage designation: Grade I listed building
- Designated: 25 August 1960

Administration
- Province: Canterbury
- Diocese: Gloucester
- Benefice: Evenlode Vale

The Anglican Church of St Mary at Icomb in the Cotswold District of Gloucestershire, England, was built in the 15th century. It is a grade I listed building.

== History ==
The first church on the site had a nave built in the 12th century with the chancel added in the 13th. A Norman doorway in the nave north wall has been blocked up. The tower was added around 1600.

The parish is part of the Evenlode Vale benefice within the Diocese of Gloucester.

== Architecture ==
The limestone building consists of a nave, chancel and a south transept. The three-stage tower has a gabled roof and contains a peal of tubular bells.

Within the church is a plaque in memory of those from the village who died in World War I. The piscina is from the 13th century and has a trefoil-headed arch. The stained glass includes an east window by James Powell and Sons.
