= Church of St Mary the Virgin, Kempsford =

Church in Gloucestershire, England

Coordinates: 51.6670°N 1.7681°W

Church of St Mary the Virgin
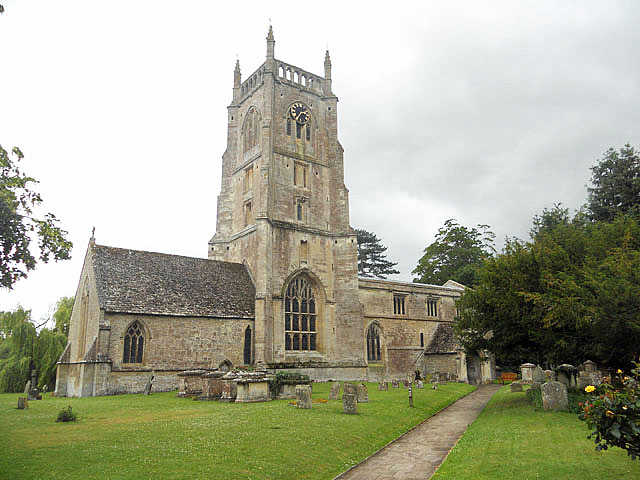

- Denomination: Church of England

Architecture
- Heritage designation: Grade I listed building
- Designated: 26 November 1958

Administration
- Province: Canterbury
- Diocese: Gloucester

The Anglican Church of St Mary the Virgin at Kempsford in the Cotswold District of Gloucestershire, England, was built in the 12th century. It is a grade I listed building.

== History ==
The church was built in the 12th century, with the nave being dated to around 1120. The chancel was added in the 13th century with further alterations in subsequent centuries. The tower was also a 13th-century construction but rebuilt in the 15th.

A Victorian restoration was carried out by George Edmund Street around 1858, and most of the internal furnishings date from this time.

In 2009 a National Lottery Heritage Fund was received to restore the tower and Victorian paintings.

The parish is part of the South Cotswold Team Ministry benefice within the Diocese of Gloucester.

== Architecture ==
The church has an eight-bay nave, chancel with wagon roof and a three-stage tower supported by diagonal buttresses. The tower is surmounted by pinnacles and parapet. It is supported by buttresses. The tower has six bells, the oldest of which date from 1678.

Inside the church is a plaque commemorating parishioners who died in World War II. Because of limited space the organ was built over and around the tomb of Lord Coleraine.

Many of the monuments in the churchyard are also listed.
