= Church of St Andrew, Sevenhampton =

Church in Gloucestershire, England

Coordinates: 51.8941°N 1.9539°W

Church of St Andrew
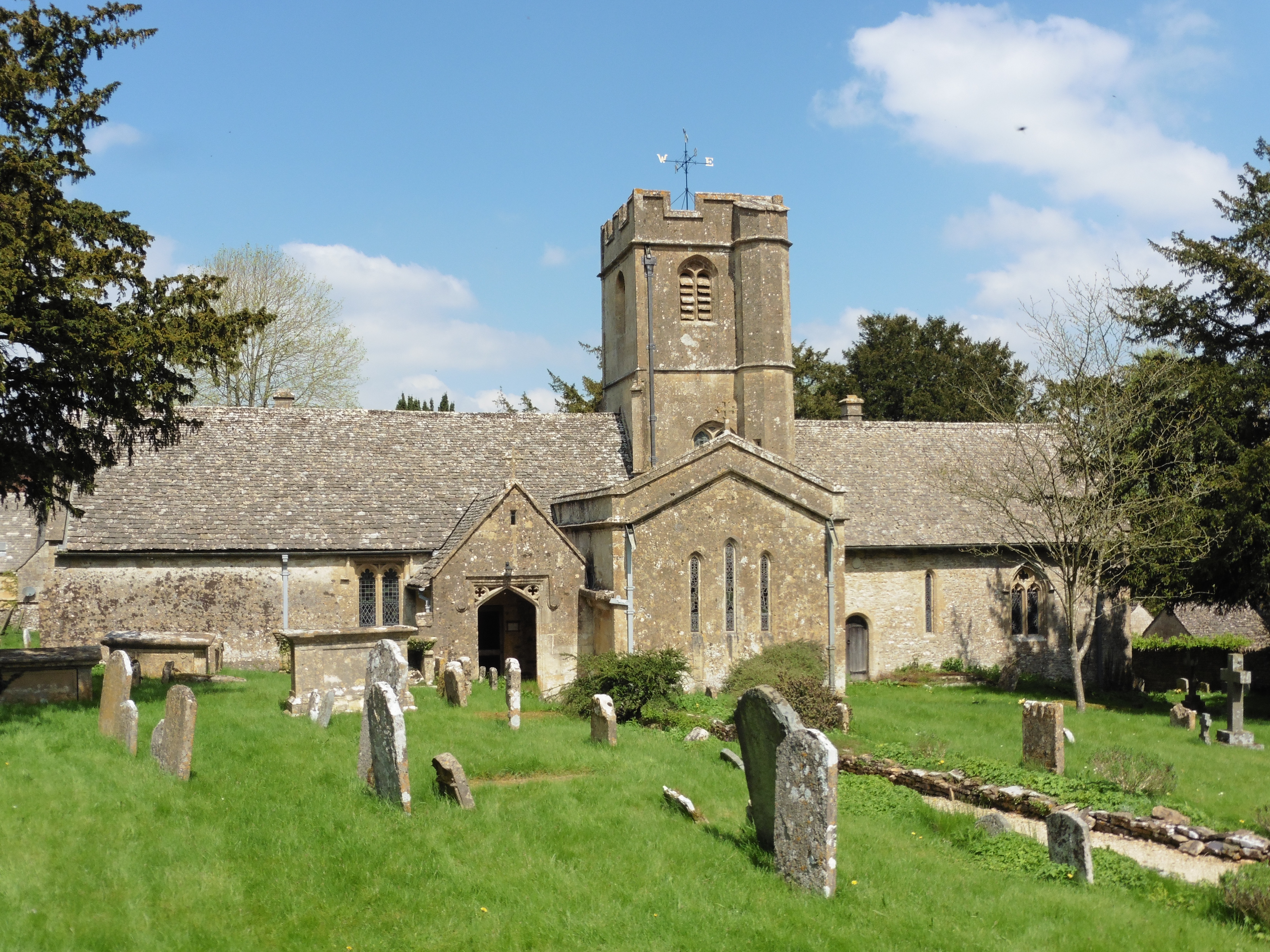

- Denomination: Church of England

Architecture
- Heritage designation: Grade I listed building
- Designated: 26 January 1961

Administration
- Province: Canterbury
- Diocese: Gloucester

The Anglican Church of St Andrew at Sevenhampton in the Cotswold District of Gloucestershire, England, was built in the 12th century. It is a grade I listed building.

== History ==
The church was built in the 12th and 13th centuries with the tower being added in the 15th. In 1136 the church was given to Llanthony Priory by Robert de Bethune the Bishop of Hereford. The work around 1500 included the insertion of the lantern tower over the Crossing. The church underwent Victorian restoration by Frederick S. Waller in 1892.

The parish of Sevenhampton with Charlton Abbots is part of the Coln River Group benefice within the Diocese of Gloucester.

== Architecture ==
The cruciform limestone building has a stone slate roof. It consists of the nave with south porch, chancel, north and south transepts and a central tower. The three-stage tower has an octagonal staircase leading to the roof. Within the tower are three bells, the oldest of which dates from the 15th century.

Nine of the church windows have stained glass, the oldest of which is from 1869. There are two fonts, one from the late 17th century and the other Victorian.

Within the church is a memorial tablet listing the names of those from the village who died in World War I. Among the other memorials are several to the Lawrence family of Whittington Court.
