= Church of St Laurence, Wyck Rissington =

Church in Gloucestershire, England

Coordinates: 51.8917°N 1.7230°W

Church of St Laurence
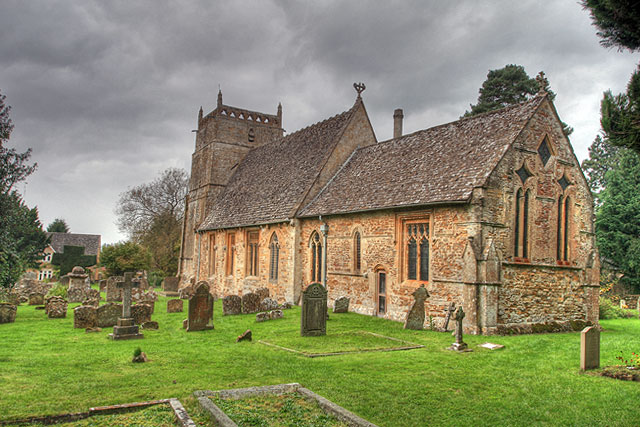

- Denomination: Church of England

Architecture
- Heritage designation: Grade I listed building
- Designated: 25 August 1960

Administration
- Province: Canterbury
- Diocese: Gloucester

The Anglican Church of St Laurence at Wyck Rissington in the Cotswold District of Gloucestershire, England, was built in the 12th century. It is a grade I listed building.

== History ==
The church was built in the 12th century, although there had been a previous Saxon church on the site long before and the base of the tower may include part of the fabric of the earlier building. The church was consecrated by the Bishop of Worcester in 1269.

The transepts were added in 1822. It underwent Victorian restoration by John Edward Knight Cutts in 1879. In 1891, Gustav Holst was employed as the organist and choirmaster for the church.

The bells in the tower were rehung in 2012.

The parish of Wyck Rissington is part of a benefice centred on Bourton-on-the-Water within the Diocese of Gloucester.

== Architecture ==
The limestone building has stone slate roofs. It consists of a nave with a north aisle and porch, a chancel, and a west tower. The chancel still has its original trussed rafter roof. The four-stage tower is supported by buttresses for the first two stages. The eaves are supported by corbel tables.

The interior includes a tub font from around 1200 and an altar table from the 17th. The rest of the fittings are 19th or 20th century. A set of 12 carved wooden plaques depicting the life of Christ are thought to be Flemish and date from the 16th century.
