= Church of St Mary, Temple Guiting =

Church in Gloucestershire, England

Coordinates: 51.9597°N 1.9120°W

Church of St Mary
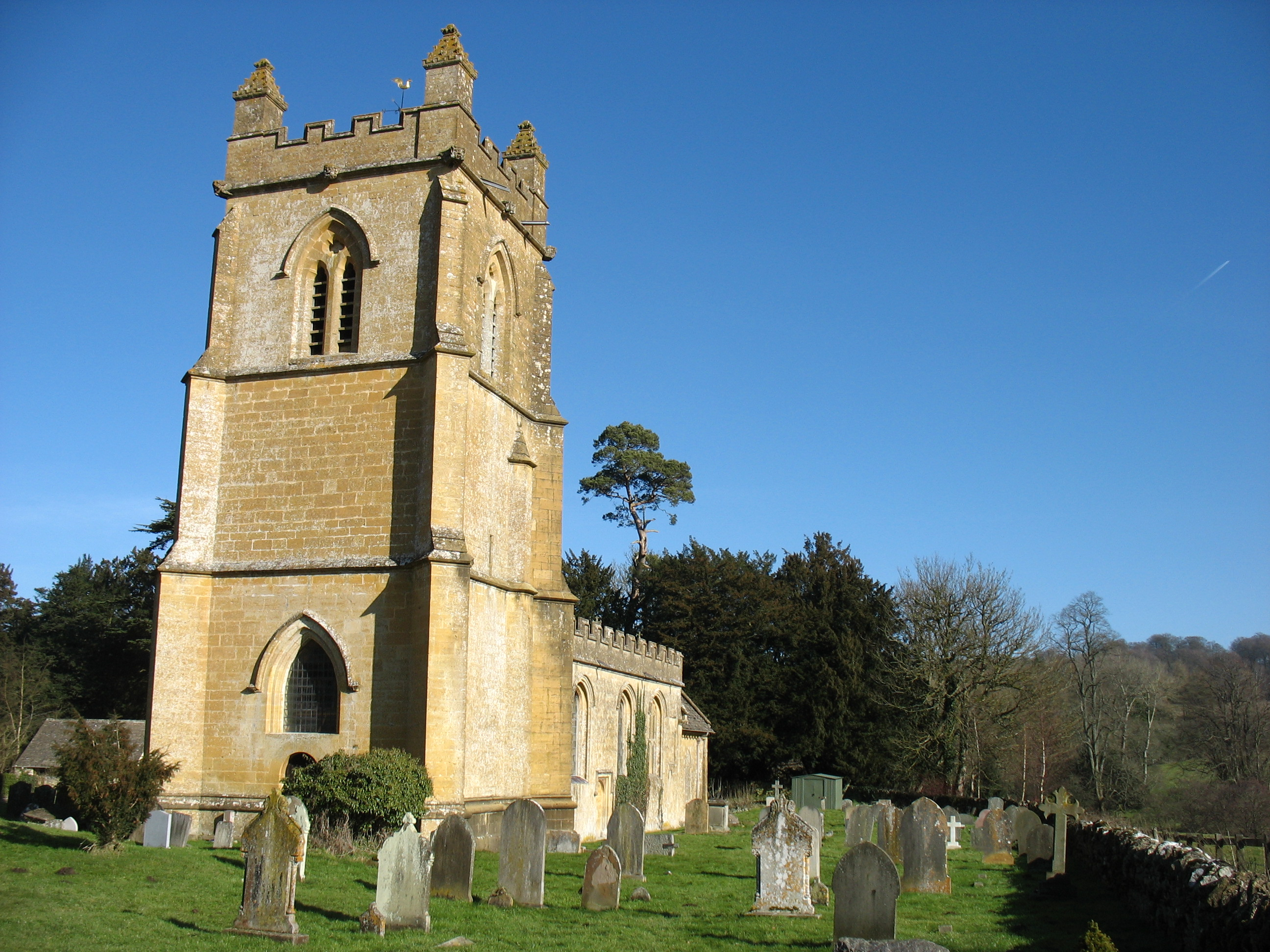

- Denomination: Church of England

Architecture
- Heritage designation: Grade I listed building
- Designated: 25 August 1960

Administration
- Province: Canterbury
- Diocese: Gloucester
- Benefice: The Guitings, Cutsdean, Farmcote, Upper Slaughter

The Anglican Church of St Mary at Temple Guiting in the Cotswold District of Gloucestershire, England, was built in the 12th century. It is a grade I listed building.

== History ==
The church was built in the 12th century and largely rebuilt in the 16th. The tower was rebuilt in the 17th century and the porch added in 1884. A Victorian restoration was carried out in 1884 by J. E. K. Cutts.

The parish is part of The Guitings, Cutsdean, Farmcote, Upper Slaughter benefice within the Diocese of Gloucester.

== Architecture ==
The limestone building has a stone slate roof. It consists of a nave with transept, chancel and west tower. The tower has a clock on the north face which was installed in 1870. The exterior of the chancel has a series of gargoyles.

Over the north door is a wooden panel with the Ten Commandments. There is an alabaster tablet commemorating those from the village who died in World War I.

There is some stained glass from the 15th and 16th century however several panels were sold in 1809 and are now in the Metropolitan Museum of Art in New York. A more modern lancet window has glass in memory of Jack Butterworth, Baron Butterworth.
