= Manor Farmhouse, Temple Guiting =

Coordinates: 51.9509°N 1.8689°W

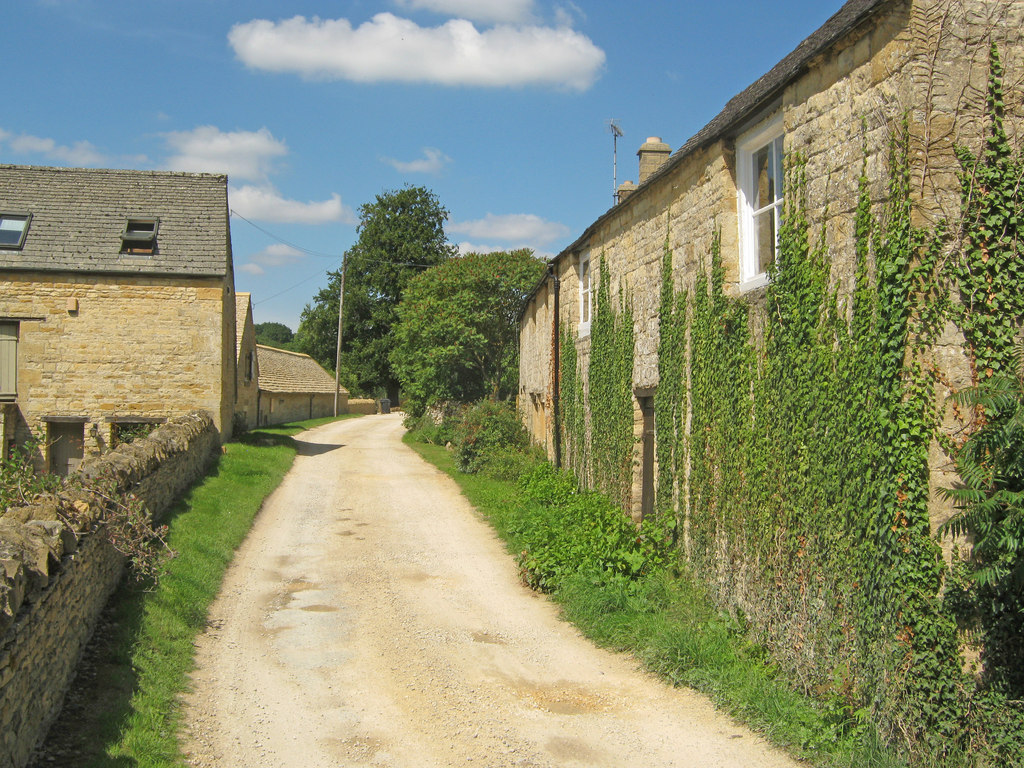
Track at Manor Farm

Temple Guiting Manor is an early 16th-century house at Temple Guiting, Gloucestershire, England. It is a Grade I listed building, and is in private ownership.
