= Church of St Leonard, Stowell Park =

Church in Gloucestershire, England

Coordinates: 51.8162°N 1.8746°W

Church of St Leonard
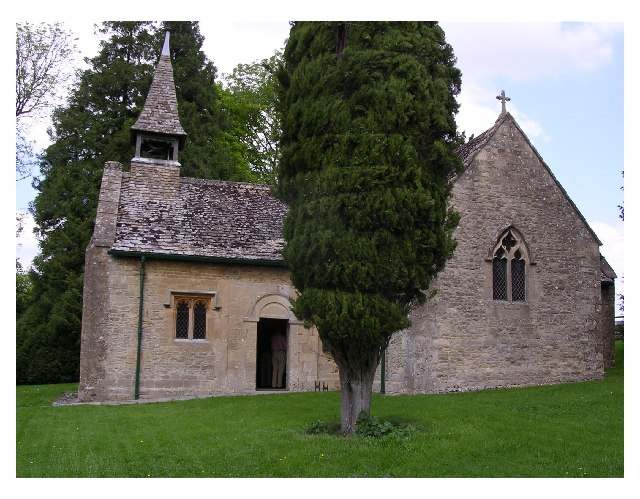

- Denomination: Church of England

Architecture
- Heritage designation: Grade I listed building
- Designated: 26 January 1961

Administration
- Province: Canterbury
- Diocese: Gloucester

The Anglican Church of St Leonard at Stowell Park, in the Cotswold District of Gloucestershire, England, was built in the 12th century. It is a grade I listed building.

== History ==
The church was built in the 12th century and revised in the 13th and 17th centuries. In the 12th century it was a chapel to Northleach church.

In 1803 the church was described as "ruinous" but some restoration was done before its reopening in 1810. More extensive Victorian restoration was undertaken by C. Hodgson Fowler in the 1890s.

The parish of Yanworth with Stowell is part of a benefice centred on Chedworth within the Diocese of Gloucester.

== Architecture ==
The limestone building has a stone slate roof. It has a cruciform plan with a nave, transepts and a chancel. There was previously a central tower but this collapsed and has now been re-roofed.

There are some remaining wall paintings, but some of these were lost in the 1890s restoration. Those in the nave date from 1150 to 1200 while those in the transept were painted in the late 12th or early 13th century. The scenes depicted include the last supper.

The plain font is from the 13th century.
