= Church of St John the Evangelist, Elkstone =

Church in Gloucestershire, England

Coordinates: 51.8093°N 2.0491°W

Church of St John the Evangelist
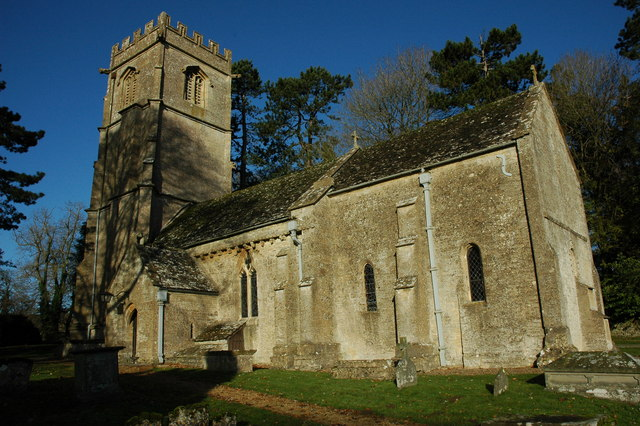

- Denomination: Church of England

Architecture
- Heritage designation: Grade I listed building
- Designated: 12 November 1958

Administration
- Province: Canterbury
- Diocese: Gloucester
- Benefice: The Churn Valley

The Anglican Church of St John the Evangelist at Elkstone in the Cotswold District of Gloucestershire, England, was built in the 12th century. It is a grade I listed building.

== History ==
The church nave, chancel and central tower was built in 1160. In the 13th century the tower was removed and the roof raised adding a columbarium or dovecote. A new three-stage tower was built in the 15th century.

The parish is part of the Churn Valley benefice within the Diocese of Gloucester.

In 2017 an "eco-loo" or composting toilet was installed and opened by the Bishop of Tewkesbury.

== Architecture ==
The limestone building has stone slate roofs. It consists of a nave, Chancel, south porch and west tower. The columbarium has pigeon holes in the north and east walls.

Some of the arches and vaults provide import remnants of Romanesque architecture. The south doorway of the nave has a Norman tympanum with a carving of a seated Christ on a cushioned throne, holding the Book of Judgement in his left hand and giving a blessing with his right. The chancel arch has a Norman chevron pattern.

The tower houses six bells with the oldest dating from 1657. Around the church are a collection of gargoyles and grotesques.

Inside the church are box pews and a wooden Jacobean hexagonal pulpit dating from 1609.
