= Elkstone =

Village in Gloucestershire, England

Coordinates: 51.8085°N 2.0495°W

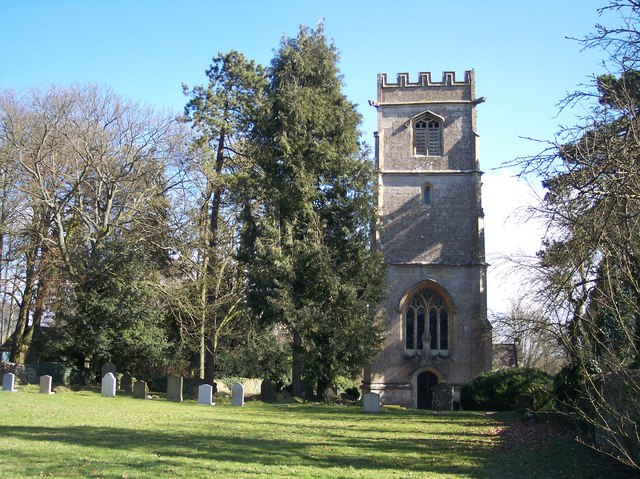
- Elkstone Church

- Location within Gloucestershire
- Population: 248 (2011 census)
- Civil parish: Elkstone
- District: Cotswold
- Shire county: Gloucestershire
- Region: South West
- Country: England
- Sovereign state: United Kingdom
- Post town: Cheltenham
- Postcode district: GL53
- Dialling code: 01242
- Police: Gloucestershire
- Fire: Gloucestershire
- Ambulance: South Western
- UK Parliament: North Cotswolds

Elkstone is a village and civil parish in the English county of Gloucestershire. In the 2001 United Kingdom census, the parish had a population of 203, increasing to 248 at the 2011 census.

Approximately 7 miles (11 km) south of its post town, Cheltenham, and approximately 8 miles (13 km) north-west of Cirencester, Elkstone lies within the Cotswolds, a designated Area of Outstanding Natural Beauty.

== History ==
Elkstone was listed as Elchestane in the Domesday Book of 1086. The Church of St John the Evangelist was built in Elkstone around 1160. It is a grade I listed building and contains an impressive Norman tympanum and Saxon stones.

== Governance ==
The civil parish of Elkstone forms part of the Ermin ward, which is in the district of Cotswold, represented by Councillor Julia Judd, a member of the Conservative Party.

Elkstone is part of the parliamentary constituency of North Cotswolds, represented at parliament by Conservative Member of Parliament (MP) Sir Geoffrey Clifton-Brown. Prior to Brexit in 2020, it was part of the South West England constituency of the European Parliament.

== See also ==
- List of civil parishes in Gloucestershire
