= Church of St Mary, Upper Swell =

Church in Gloucestershire, England

Coordinates: 51.9398°N 1.7442°W

Church of St Mary
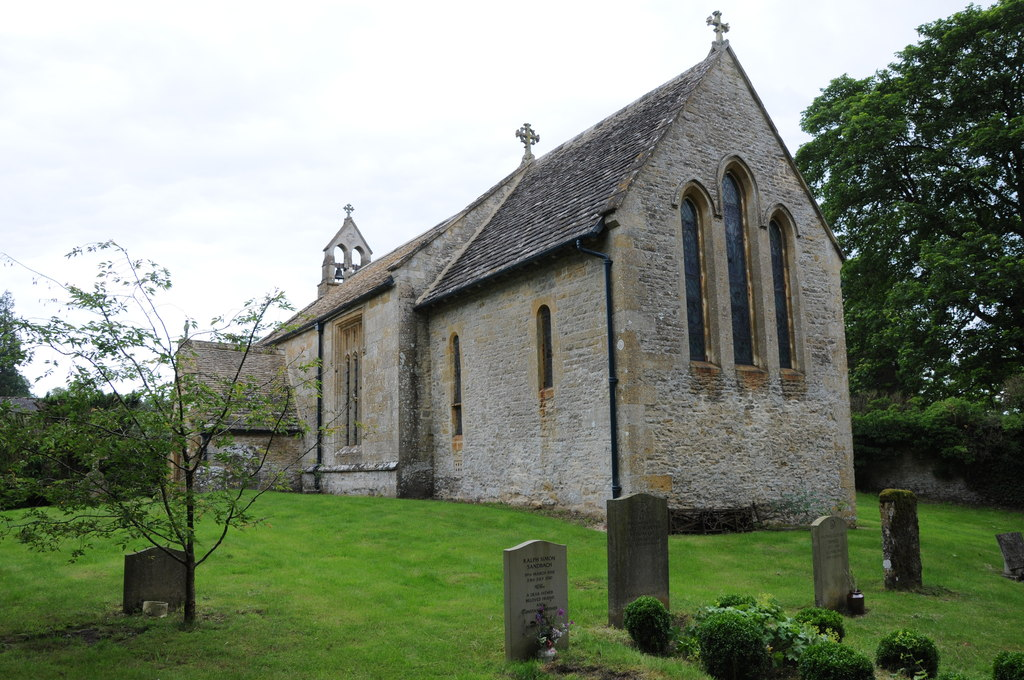

- Location within Gloucestershire
- Denomination: Church of England

Architecture
- Heritage designation: Grade I listed building
- Designated: 25 August 1960

Administration
- Province: Canterbury
- Diocese: Gloucester
- Benefice: Stow on the Wold, Condicote & The Swells

The Church of St Mary is an Anglican church in Upper Swell in the Cotswold District of Gloucestershire, England. It was built in the 12th century and is a Grade I listed building.

== History ==
The chancel of the 12th-century church was added in the 13th century, and the nave was revised during the 15th and early 16th centuries.

The parish is part of the Stow on the Wold, Condicote and The Swells benefice within the Diocese of Gloucester.

== Architecture ==
The Cotswold stone building has a stone slate roof. It consists of a three-bay nave and two-bay chancel with a south porch. The bellcote on the west gable has two bells.

Inside the church is a 15th-century font and a piscina in the chancel. There is a Norman doorway with a carved tympanum. There is a mass dial on the jamb of the porch door. The organ was built by Nicholson & Co Ltd in 1872.
