= Church of St Peter, Windrush =

Church in Gloucestershire, England

Coordinates: 51.8157°N 1.7210°W

Church of St Peter
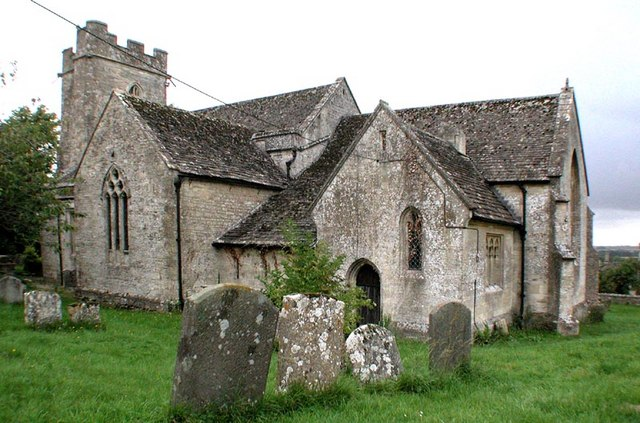

- Denomination: Church of England

Architecture
- Heritage designation: Grade I listed building
- Designated: 26 January 1961

Administration
- Province: Canterbury
- Diocese: Gloucester
- Benefice: Windrush

The Anglican Church of St Peter at Windrush in the Cotswold District of Gloucestershire, England, was built in the 12th century. It is a grade I listed building.

== History ==
The church was built in the 12th century as a chapel of Great Barrington, and belonged to Llanthony Priory. The south transept was added in the 14th century.

A Victorian restoration by Henry Woodyer between 1874 and 1876 included the addition of the organ chamber and a vestry.

In 2015 the south doorway was cleaned and given protection against further decay.

The parish is part of the Windrush benefice within the Diocese of Gloucester.

== Architecture ==
The limestone building has stone slate roofs. It consists of a three-bay nave with a south aisle and transept, a chancel with a vestry and an organ chamber.

The three-stage tower has six bells, five of them date from 1707 and were cast by Rudhall of Gloucester.

The surround of the south doorway is Norman with a double row of "beakheads" each slightly different and representing demons and a saw-tooth pattern decoration on the outside. The doorway has two mass dials.

The octagonal font was carved in the 15th century and the pulpit is Jacobean.
