= Church of St Peter, Rendcomb =

Church in Gloucestershire, England

Coordinates: 51.7867°N 1.9745°W

Church of St Peter
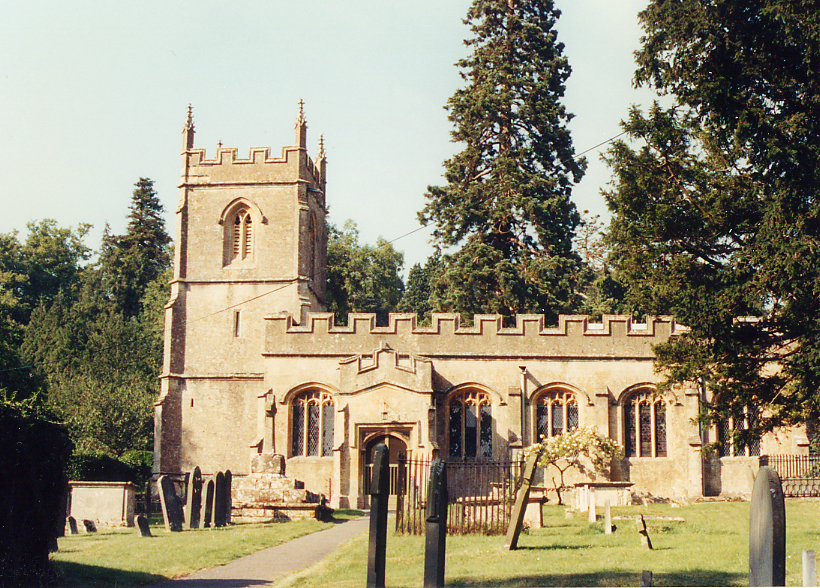

- Denomination: Church of England

Architecture
- Heritage designation: Grade I listed building
- Designated: 26 November 1958

Administration
- Province: Canterbury
- Diocese: Gloucester

The Anglican Church of St Peter within the grounds of Rendcomb College at Rendcomb in the Cotswold District of Gloucestershire, England, was rebuilt in the 16th century. It is a grade I listed building.

== History ==
There has been a church on the site however it was largely rebuilt in 1517 by Edmund Tame a local wool merchant. Three Norman pillars were incorporated into the fabric of the new church. A Victorian restoration was undertaken in 1895.

The parish is part of the Churn Valley benefice within the Diocese of Gloucester.

== Architecture ==
The Perpendicular Gothic stone building has a lead and stone slate roof. It consists of a five-bay nave with a three-bay south aisle, chancel with a south chapel, vestry and a west tower. The buttressed three-stage tower contains three bells which were recast in the 1840s by Thomas Mears and three from the 15th century.

Within the church is a stone tablet listing the six men from the village who served and died during World War II.

The cylindrical font dates from the 11th century. It was brought to Rendcomb from Elmore Court and initially used as a garden ornament. It was moved into the church in the 19th century. Around the bowl are carvings of eleven figures which represent the apostles, the twelfth, Judas is represented by disembodied feet.
