= Church of St Mary, Bibury =

Church in Gloucestershire, England

Coordinates: 51.7571°N 1.8301°W

Church of St Mary
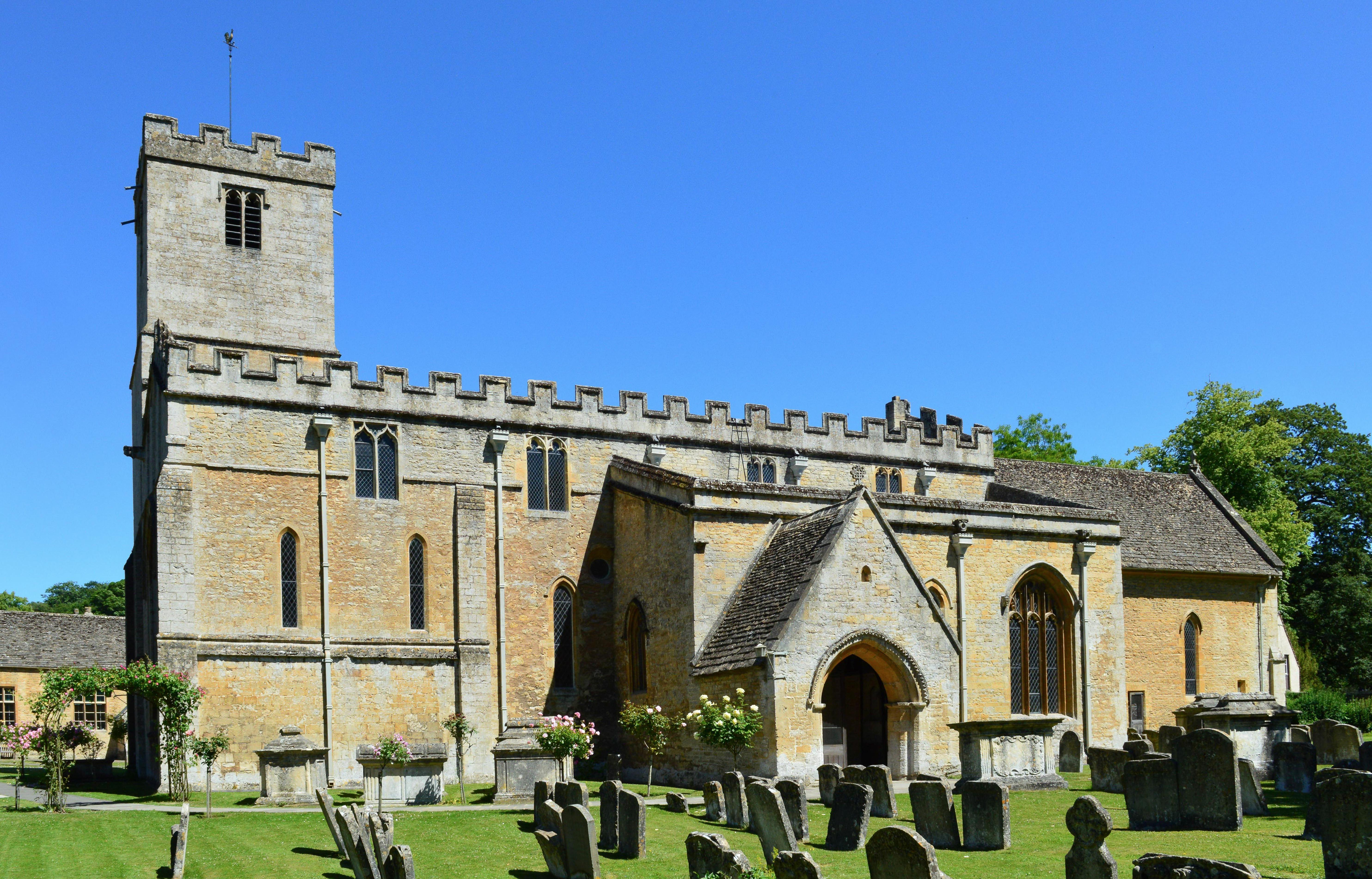

- Denomination: Church of England

Architecture
- Heritage designation: Grade I listed building
- Designated: 26 January 1961

Administration
- Province: Canterbury
- Diocese: Gloucester
- Parish: Bibury

The Anglican Church of St Mary at Bibury in the Cotswold District of Gloucestershire, England, was built in the 11th century. It is a grade I listed building.

== History ==
The first church in Bibury was established in 899. The Anglo-Saxon church was built in the middle to late 11th century with further work in subsequent centuries.

The church was the property of Osney Abbey until the dissolution of the monasteries.

A Victorian restoration was undertaken in 1863 by George Gilbert Scott with further restoration later in the 19th century. The organ was moved to the south aisle in 1920.

The parish is part of the South Cotswold benefice within the Diocese of Gloucester.

== Architecture ==
The limestone building has a stone slate roof. It consists of a nave with north and south aisles and a clerestory, chancel and a south porch. The tower arises from the north west corner, supported by buttresses and contains a 15th-century belfry. A Saxon stone grave slab has been incorporated into the north wall. Four similar Saxon slabs were given to the British Museum.

The north doorway was constructed around 1180.

The interior furnishings include a 13th-century font and memorials from several centuries. Unusually the font is square, with the sides carved with arches. The oldest of the stained glass is from the 13th century with more recent work by Thomas Willement and William Wailes. Glass by Karl Parsons installed in 1927 was used on a 1992 Christmas stamp.
