= Church of St Andrew, Chedworth =

Coordinates: 51.808°N 1.9264°W

Church of St Andrew
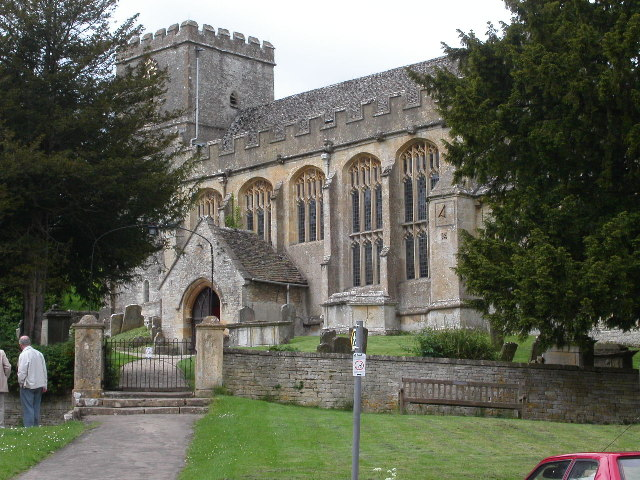

- Denomination: Church of England

Architecture
- Heritage designation: Grade I listed building

Administration
- Province: Canterbury
- Diocese: Gloucester
- Archdeaconry: Cheltenham
- Deanery: North Cotswold
- Parish: Chedworth

The Anglican Church of St Andrew at Chedworth in the Cotswold District of Gloucestershire, England was built in the late 12th century. It is a grade I listed building.

== History ==
The original 12th-century building was rebuilt in the 13th and 15th centuries. The north aisle was rebuilt in 1883.

The parish is part of the Chedworth Yanworth and Stowell benefice within the Diocese of Gloucester.

== Architecture ==
The limestone building consists of a five-bay nave, two-bay chancel and seven-bay north aisle and west tower. The fourth stage of the tower was added in the 15th century. The corbels supporting the roof are carved to represent St Andrew and Henry VII and his wife Elizabeth of York who may have visited the church in 1491.

The font dates from the 12th century and the piscina from the 13th. Inside the church is a plaque commemorating those from the village who died in World War I and World War II. Some of the stained glass from the 15th century remains in chancel windows.
