= Church of St Lawrence, Didmarton =

Church in Gloucestershire, England

Coordinates: 51.5856°N 2.2578°W

Church of St Lawrence
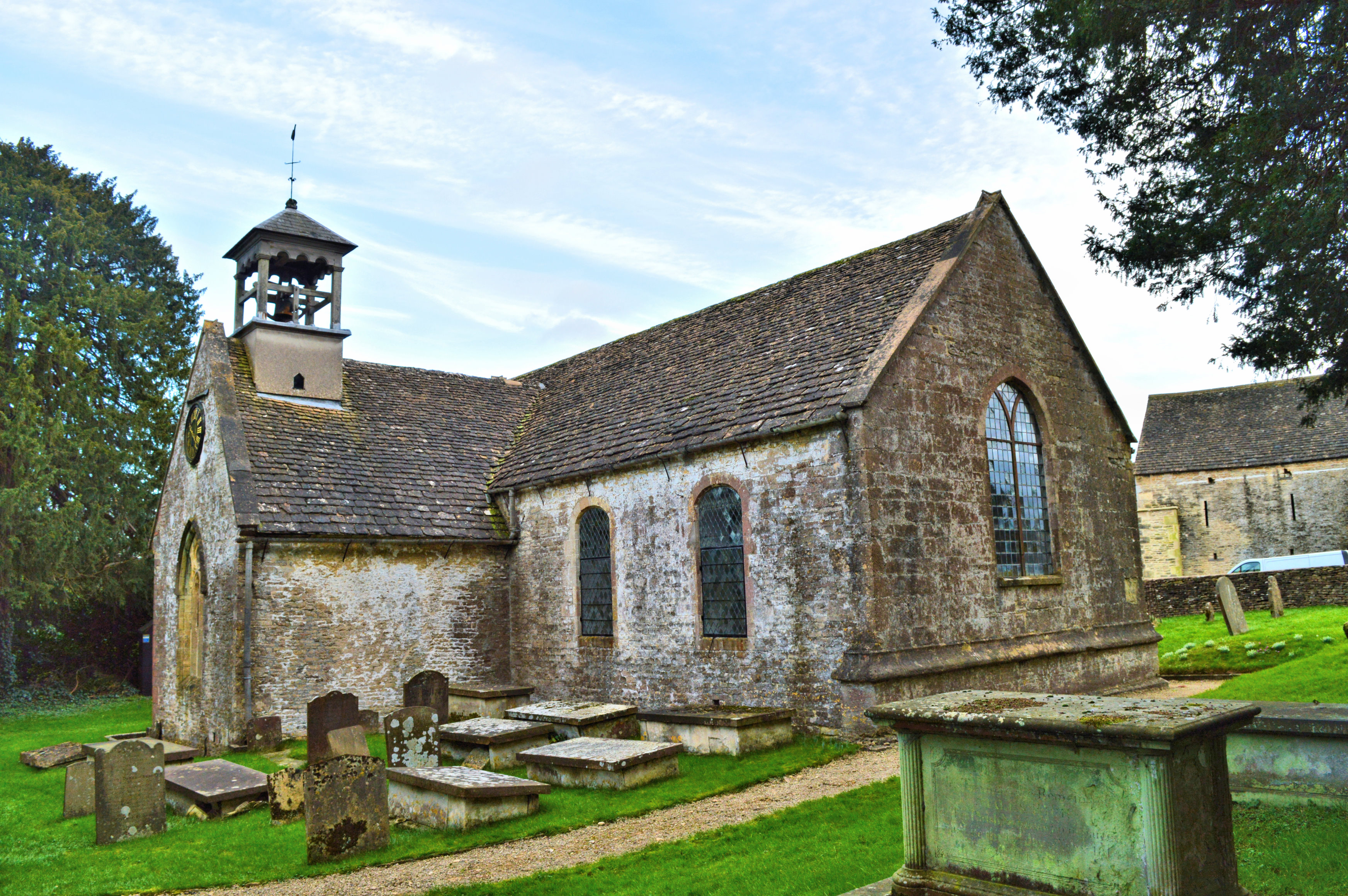

- Denomination: Church of England

Architecture
- Heritage designation: Grade I listed building
- Designated: 6 September 1954

Administration
- Province: Canterbury
- Diocese: Gloucester
- Benefice: Badminton

The Anglican Church of St Lawrence at Didmarton in the Cotswold District of Gloucestershire, England, was built in the 13th century. It is a grade I listed building.

== History ==
The church was originally built in the 12th and 13th centuries, revised in the 15th, and underwent extensive renovation in the 18th.

North and West galleries, for minstrels and those who could not afford box pews have been removed.

In 1872 the church was described as redundant but in 1992 was restored to be the parish church of Didmarton with Oldbury-on-the-Hill.

== Architecture ==
The L-shaped stone building has stone slate roofs with a small bellcote. It consists of a transept, chancel and sanctuary.

Inside the church are box pews and a triple decker oak pulpit. Behind the pulpit is a decalogue with the Ten Commandments.

The font has a stem from the 12th century, bowl from the 14th and an 18th-century wooden cover.
