= Church of St Oswald, Shipton Oliffe =

Church in Gloucestershire, England

Coordinates: 51.8654°N 1.9476°W

Church of St Oswald
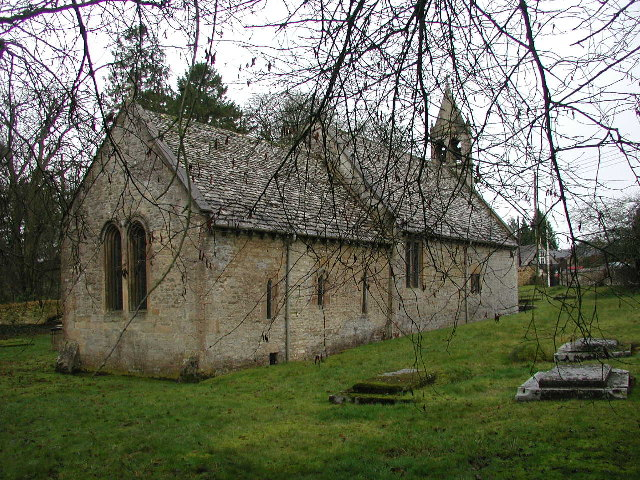

- Denomination: Church of England

Architecture
- Heritage designation: Grade I listed building
- Designated: 26 January 1961

Administration
- Province: Canterbury
- Diocese: Gloucester
- Benefice: Coln River Group

The Anglican Church of St Oswald at Shipton Oliffe in Shipton in the Cotswold District of Gloucestershire, England, was built in the 12th century. It is a grade I listed building.

== History ==
The earliest part of the church is Norman but was extended in the 13th century by the addition of the chancel and south aisle.

The church was owned by Gloucester Abbey.

The west gallery and box pews were removed and the church restored between 1902 and 1904 by H.A. Prothero.

The parish is part of the Coln River Group benefice within the Diocese of Gloucester.

== Architecture ==
The limestone building has a stone slate roof. It consists of a nave, south transept with porch and chancel.

There is a small 13th century bellcote with two pointed bell chambers.

In the church is a medieval octagonal font and 14th century piscina within a sedilia. There are fragments of wall paintings on the chancel arch and north wall. The north wall also has a blocked Norman doorway which has since had a window inserted into it.
