= Church of St George, Hampnett =

Anglican church in Gloucestershire, England

Coordinates: 51.8397°N 1.8557°W

Church of St George
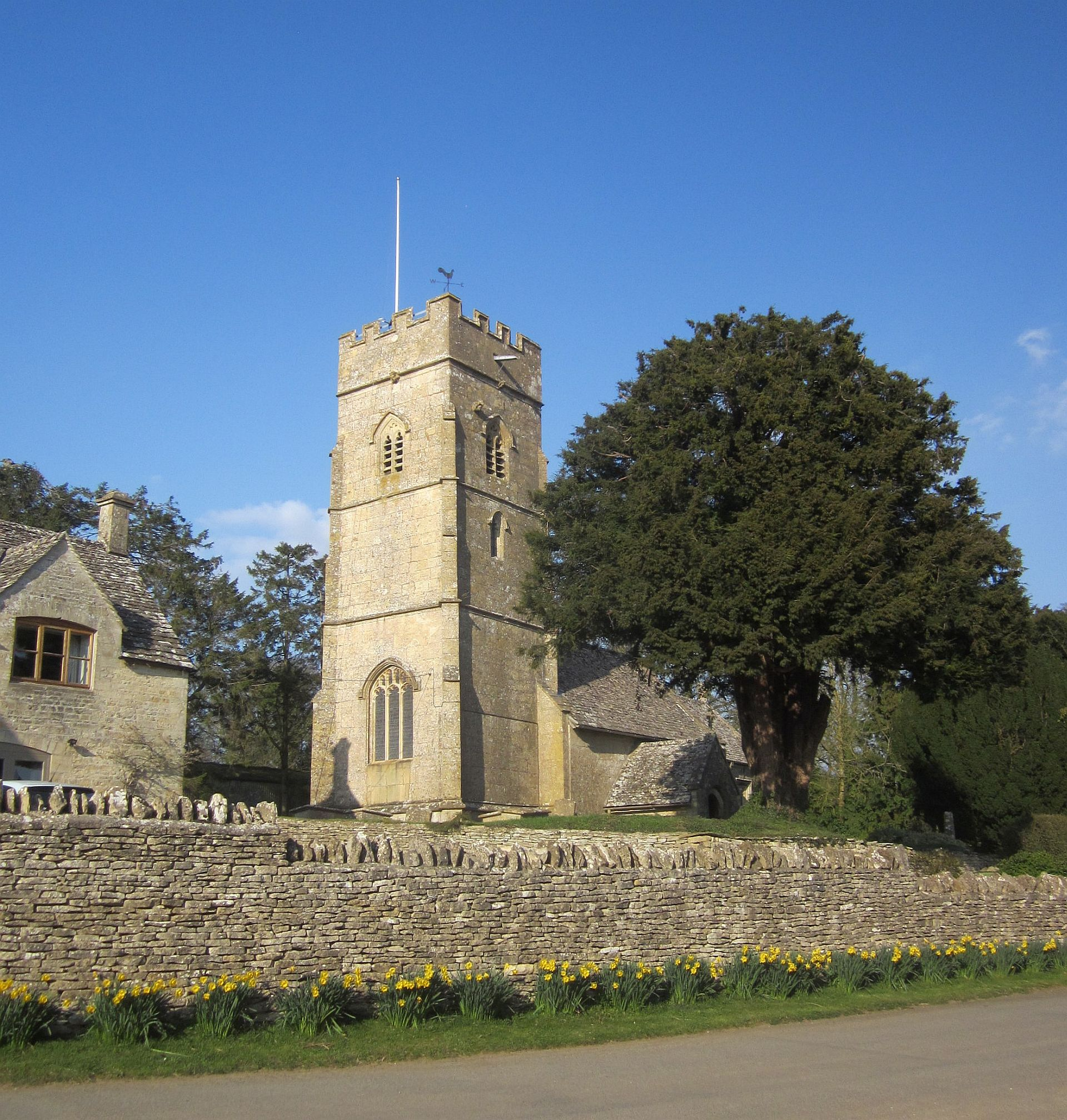

- Denomination: Church of England

Architecture
- Heritage designation: Grade I listed building
- Designated: 26 January 1961

Administration
- Province: Canterbury
- Diocese: Gloucester
- Benefice: Northleach

The Anglican Church of St George at Hampnett in the Cotswold District of Gloucestershire, England, was built in 12th century. It is a grade I listed building.

== History ==
The nave and chancel were built around 1125. The tower was added in the 15th century.

Between 1868 and 1871 the vicar, William Wiggin, painted the interior in a recreation of medieval art. There is a suggestion that he did not do the painting himself but used the firm of Clayton and Bell who are more usually associated with stained glass.

The parish is part of the Northleach benefice within the Diocese of Gloucester.

== Architecture ==
The limestone building, with a stone slate roof, consists of a two-bay chancel, a nave, and a west tower. The three-stage tower contains bells by Rudhall of Gloucester.

The north doorway of the nave has a Romanesque tympanum.

The octagonal font is from the late 15th or early 16th century. The organ replaced an earlier one in 1874.
