= Saintbury =

Village in Gloucestershire, England

Coordinates: 52.056°N 1.830°W

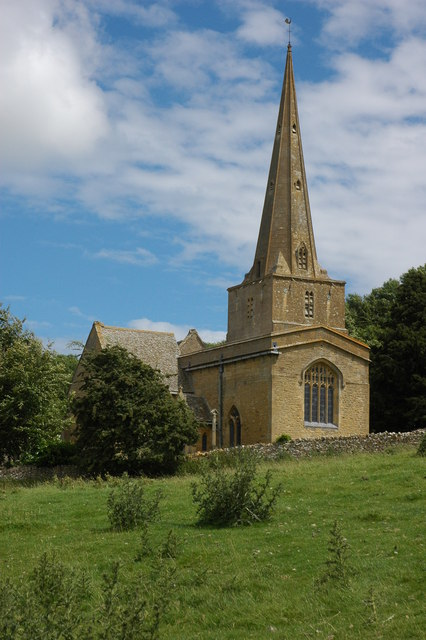
- Church of St Nicholas, Saintbury

- Location within Gloucestershire
- Population: 83 (2011)
- District: Cotswold
- Shire county: Gloucestershire
- Region: South West
- Country: England
- Sovereign state: United Kingdom
- Post town: Broadway
- Postcode district: WR12
- Police: Gloucestershire
- Fire: Gloucestershire
- Ambulance: South Western
- UK Parliament: North Cotswolds

Saintbury is a village and civil parish in the Cotswold District of Gloucestershire, England. The population of the civil parish at the 2011 Census was 83. Saintbury was mentioned in the Domesday Book (1086) as Suineberie.

The Church of St Nicholas was built in the 13th century. It is a grade I listed building. It includes a Norman south door with tympanum. The north door is also Norman and above it is a circular Anglo-Saxon tide dial.
