= St Michael and St Martin's Church, Eastleach Martin =

Coordinates: 51.7453°N 1.7085°W

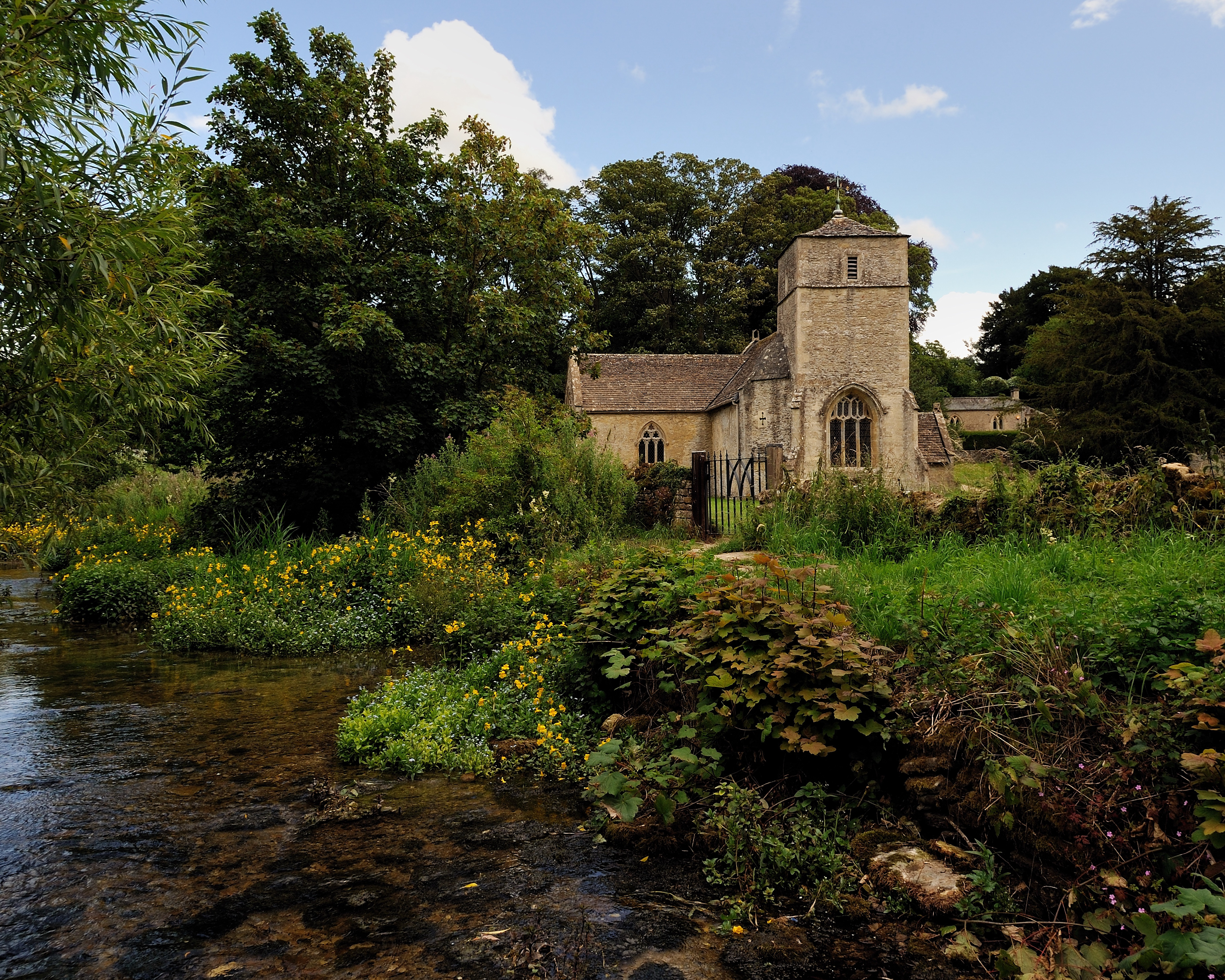
- St Michael and St Martin's Church, Eastleach Martin

- Location in Gloucestershire
- OS grid reference: SP 202 052
- Location: Eastleach Martin, Gloucestershire
- Country: England
- Denomination: Anglican
- Website: St Michael and St Martin's Church, Eastleach Martin

History
- Founded: 12th century
- Founder: Richard Fitzpons

Architecture
- Functional status: Redundant
- Heritage designation: Grade I
- Designated: 5 February 1987
- Architectural type: Church
- Style: Norman, Gothic

Specifications
- Materials: Limestone, stone slate roofs

St Michael and St Martin's Church is a historic Anglican church in Eastleach Martin, Gloucestershire, England under the care of The Churches Conservation Trust. It is recorded in the National Heritage List for England as a designated Grade I listed building. The church stands close to the River Leach which divides Eastleach Martin from its twin village of Eastleach Turville. Eastleach Turville's Church of St Andrew stands only 180 metres away from the Church of St Michael and St Martin.

== History ==
The church was founded in the 12th century by Richard Fitzpons, whose son granted it to Great Malvern Priory in 1120. The chancel was added to the church during the following century, followed by the transept in the 14th century. In the early 19th century the churchman John Keble, later a founding member of the Oxford Movement, was curate to the church. The nearby clapper bridge crossing the River Leach is named "Keble's Bridge" after him. The church was restored in 1880 and re-roofed in 1886. The church was declared redundant on 1 May 1981, and was vested in The Churches Conservation Trust on 24 November 1982.

== Architecture ==
The church is constructed in random rubble limestone, with a stone slate roof. Its plan consists of a nave with a south porch and a north transept, a chancel and a west tower. The south doorway dates from the 12th century and is in Norman style with a rounded arch. The porch dates from the following century, and has a pointed arch, a gable, and a sundial finial. In the east wall of the porch is a niche with a trefoil head. To the right of the porch is a 13th-century two-light window. In the north wall of the nave is a square-headed blocked doorway, and a blocked window with a pointed arch to its right at a higher level. The tower is in two stages with a hipped roof and a tall weathervane finial. It has diagonal buttresses, and a Perpendicular west window. In the upper stage, the bell openings are small and square. There is a stair turret set at an angle on the north side of the tower. The transept has a five-light north window and three-light windows on the east and west sides; all these windows have Decorated tracery. On the gable at the east end of the nave are the remains of a bellcote. The east window of the chancel has three lights with Early English tracery, above which is a niche. The north and south walls of the chancel contain lancet windows. The interior of the church is limewashed. It contains a piscina with a trefoil head, a hexagonal timber pulpit with Jacobean panelling, and an octagonal stone font dating from the 15th century. Some of the windows contain fragments of medieval stained glass.

== External features ==
There are two structures in the churchyard that have been designated as Grade II listed buildings. One is the base and shaft of a cross dating from the 14th century. The other is a pair of tombs dating from the early 18th and early 19th centuries.

== See also ==
- List of churches preserved by the Churches Conservation Trust in the English Midlands
