= Cotswold District Council elections =

Local government elections in Gloucestershire, England

Cotswold District Council in Gloucestershire, England, is elected every four years.

== Political control ==
Since the first elections to the council in 1973 political control of the council has been held by the following parties:

Party in control	Years
Independent	1973–1999
No overall control	1999–2003
Conservative	2003–2019
Liberal Democrats	2019–present

=== Council composition ===
Composition of the council
Year	Conservative	Liberal Democrats (Note: Includes totals for the predecessors of the Liberal Democrats, the Liberal Party and SDP (both of which participated in the Alliance).)	Labour	Green (Note: Includes totals for the predecessors of the Green Party of England and Wales, the Ecology Party and Green Party UK.)	Independents & Others	Council control after election
Local government reorganisation; council established (45 seats)
1973	1	1	2	–	41	Independent
1976	3	0	0	0	42	Independent
New ward boundaries (45 seats)
1979	6	3	2	0	34	Independent
1983	10	4	1	0	30	Independent
1987	11	2	1	0	31	Independent
New ward boundaries (45 seats)
1991	9	3	1	0	32	Independent
1995	3	9	5	0	28	Independent
New ward boundaries (45 seats)
1999	14	7	2	0	22	No overall control
New ward boundaries (44 seats)
2003	24	8	0	0	12	Conservative
2007	38	4	0	0	2	Conservative
2011	27	12	0	0	5	Conservative
New ward boundaries (34 seats)
2015	24	10	0	0	0	Conservative
2019	14	18	0	1	1	Liberal Democrats
2023	9	22	0	2	1	Liberal Democrats

=== Leadership ===
The leaders of the council since 2003 have been:

Councillor	Party	From	To
Julie Girling	Conservative	2003	2006
Lynden Stowe	Conservative	2006	16 May 2017
Mark Annett	Conservative	16 May 2017	Sep 2018
Tony Berry	Conservative	11 Dec 2018	14 May 2019
Joe Harris	Liberal Democrats	14 May 2019	

== Results maps ==
2003 results map

2007 results map

2011 results map

2015 results map

2019 results map

2023 results map

== By-election results ==
=== 1995–1999 ===
Bourton on the Water By-Election 16 May 1996
Party	Candidate	Votes	%	±%
Independent	Dudley Mills	381	56.0	
Liberal Democrats		299	43.9	
Majority		82	12.1	
Turnout		680	25.3	
Independent gain from Independent		Swing		

Northleach By-Election 22 August 1996
Party	Candidate	Votes	%	±%
Independent	Amanda Courtney	227	57.7	
Independent		88	22.4	
Liberal Democrats		78	19.8	
Majority		139	35.3	
Turnout		393	28.5	
Independent gain from Liberal Democrats		Swing		

=== 1999–2003 ===
Cirencester Watermoor By-Election 5 April 2001
Party	Candidate	Votes	%	±%
Liberal Democrats	Peter Hedges	300	48.2	+31.6
Conservative	Barbara Good	259	41.6	+23.2
Independent	Norman Whereat	63	10.1	−31.6
Majority		41	6.6	
Turnout		622	19.6	
Liberal Democrats gain from Labour		Swing		

Stow-on-the-Wold By-Election 7 June 2001
Party	Candidate	Votes	%	±%
Independent	Vera Norwood	438	42.1	+4.2
Conservative	Merryl Phillips	317	30.5	−31.6
Liberal Democrats	Clifford Rebbeck	285	27.4	+27.4
Majority		121	11.6	
Turnout		1,040		
Independent gain from Conservative		Swing		

Northleach By-Election 4 October 2001
Party	Candidate	Votes	%	±%
Conservative	Matthew Gordon-Banks	209	44.4	
Independent	David Broad	153	32.5	
Independent	Douglas Christopherson	109	23.1	
Majority		56	11.9	
Turnout		471	30.1	
Conservative gain from Independent		Swing		

=== 2003–2007 ===
Northleach By-Election 20 January 2005
Party	Candidate	Votes	%	±%
Conservative	Mark Tufnell	435	69.4	
Liberal Democrats	Kenneth Mustoe	105	16.7	
Independent	Alan Wellman	87	13.9	
Majority		330	52.7	
Turnout		627	44.0	
Conservative hold		Swing		

Cirencester Watermoor By-Election 5 May 2005
Party	Candidate	Votes	%	±%
Liberal Democrats	John Leicester	1,201	66.8	+8.6
Conservative		597	33.2	−8.6
Majority		604	33.6	
Turnout		1,798	60.2	
Liberal Democrats hold		Swing		

Kempsford-Lechlade By-Election 21 July 2005
Party	Candidate	Votes	%	±%
Conservative	Sandra Carter	683	62.9	+23.7
Liberal Democrats	Peterjon Maslen	403	37.1	+21.3
Majority		280	25.8	
Turnout		1,086	34.8	
Conservative gain from Independent		Swing		

Beacon-Stow By-Election 12 January 2006
Party	Candidate	Votes	%	±%
Conservative	David Penman	540	63.8	+23.8
Independent	John Kennell	307	36.2	−4.6
Majority		233	27.6	
Turnout		847	31.3	
Conservative gain from Independent		Swing		

=== 2007–2011 ===
Water Park By-Election 13 March 2008
Party	Candidate	Votes	%	±%
Liberal Democrats	Peter Clarke	648	55.5	+15.3
Conservative	Lynne Armstrong-Hobbs	519	44.5	−15.3
Majority		129	11.0	
Turnout		1,167	26.2	
Liberal Democrats gain from Conservative		Swing		

Campden Vale By-Election 4 June 2009
Party	Candidate	Votes	%	±%
Conservative	Mark Annett	1,595	73.1	−26.9
Liberal Democrats	Andrew Clayton	588	26.9	+26.9
Majority		1,007	46.2	
Turnout		2,183	45.4	
Conservative hold		Swing		

Water Park By-Election 17 September 2009
Party	Candidate	Votes	%	±%
Liberal Democrats	Esmond Jenkins	894	71.7	+31.5
Conservative	Brian Viner	353	28.3	−31.5
Majority		541	43.4	
Turnout		1,247	28.3	
Liberal Democrats hold		Swing		

=== 2011–2015 ===
Fosseridge By-Election 31 May 2012
Party	Candidate	Votes	%	±%
Conservative	Julian Beale	379	58.8	−20.2
Liberal Democrats	Danny Loveridge	168	26.0	4.7
Independent	Chris Turner	98	15.2	15.2
Majority		211	32.8	
Turnout		645	42.4	
Conservative hold		Swing		

=== 2015–2019 ===
Stow By-Election 30 September 2016
Party	Candidate	Votes	%	±%
Liberal Democrats	Dilys Neill	555	64.9	+21.0
Conservative	David Penman	300	35.1	−21.0
Majority		255		
Turnout		855	40.5	
Liberal Democrats gain from Conservative		Swing	21%	

Fairford North By-Election 9 February 2017
Party	Candidate	Votes	%	±%
Liberal Democrats	Andrew Doherty	610	68.1	+40.2
Conservative	Dominic Morris	270	30.1	−20.9
Green	Xanthe Messenger	15	1.8	N/A
Majority		340	38.0	
Turnout		897	46.57	
Liberal Democrats gain from Conservative		Swing		

Grumbolds Ash with Avening By-Election 23 November 2017
Party	Candidate	Votes	%	±%
Conservative	Richard Morgan	420	64.7	−6.8
Liberal Democrats	Nicky Baber	136	21.0	−7.5
Labour	Edward Shelton	93	14.3	+14.3
Majority		284	43.8	
Turnout		649		
Conservative hold		Swing		

=== 2019–2023 ===
Fosseridge By-Election 6 May 2021
Party	Candidate	Votes	%	±%
Conservative	David Cunningham	641	63.7	−5.0
Liberal Democrats	Dominique Simpson	251	25.0	−6.3
Green	Clare Turner	114	11.3	+11.3
Majority		390	38.8	
Turnout		1,006		
Conservative hold		Swing		

Campden and Vale By-Election 3 February 2022
Party	Candidate	Votes	%	±%
Conservative	Tom Stowe	1,180	56.2	+12.5
Liberal Democrats	Danny Loveridge	920	43.8	+18.2
Majority		260	12.4	
Turnout		2,100		
Conservative hold		Swing		

=== 2023–2027 ===
Lechlade, Kempsford and Fairford South By-Election 14 December 2023
Party	Candidate	Votes	%	±%
Liberal Democrats	Tristan Wilkinson	705	48.5	
Conservative	Stephen Andrews	624	42.9	
Labour	Anna Mainwaring	73	5.0	
Independent	Marshall Regan	53	3.6	
Majority		81	5.6	
Turnout		1,455		
Liberal Democrats hold		Swing		

Chesterton By-Election 16 January 2025
Party	Candidate	Votes	%	±%
Liberal Democrats	Andrea Ann Pellegram	296	48.1	–15.8
Reform	Jill Rixon	152	24.7	N/A
Conservative	Ryan Dhindsa	106	17.2	–7.7
Labour	Andrew Farmer	61	9.9	N/A
Majority		144	23.4	–15.6
Turnout		617	35.37	
Liberal Democrats hold				

Tetbury with Upton By-Election 1 May 2025
Party	Candidate	Votes	%	±%
Conservative	Laura Hall-Wilson	318	40.3	+11.1
Liberal Democrats	Pauline Foster	277	35.1	–3.1
Reform	Elizabeth Nagle	130	16.5	N/A
Green	Michael Graeme Wagner	49	6.2	–6.8
Labour	Josh Littler-Jennings	16	2.0	N/A
Majority		41	5.2	
Turnout		793	46.19	
Conservative gain from Liberal Democrats				

Watermoor By-Election 1 May 2025
Party	Candidate	Votes	%	±%
Liberal Democrats	Nick Bridges	330	48.7	–21.3
Reform	Lisa Marden	163	24.0	N/A
Conservative	McKenzie Fuller	101	14.9	–15.1
Labour	Andy Farmer	45	6.6	N/A
Green	Tony Cima	39	5.8	N/A
Majority		167	24.6	
Turnout		678	31.82	
Liberal Democrats hold				

The Rissingtons By-Election 22 January 2026
Party	Candidate	Votes	%	±%
Liberal Democrats	Craig Thurling	321	37.5	+37.5
Conservative	Alastair Watson	268	31.3	–12.1
Reform	Matt Fincham	221	25.8	+25.8
Green	Bob Eastoe	47	5.5	−51.1
Majority		53	6.2	
Turnout		857		
Liberal Democrats gain from Green		Swing		

The Beeches By-Election 12 March 2026
Party	Candidate	Votes	%	±%
Liberal Democrats	Paul Evans	390	52.7	−2.8
Reform	Mackenzie Vaughan	168	22.7	+22.7
Conservative	Ben Shaw	122	16.5	–17.8
Green	Bob Irving	53	7.2	−2.9
Labour	Joshua Littler-Jennings	7	0.9	+0.9
Majority		222	30.0	
Turnout		740		
Liberal Democrats hold		Swing		

St Michael's By-Election 2 July 2026
Party	Candidate	Votes	%	±%
Liberal Democrats	Naomi Bloomer	344	58.4	−10.0
Conservative	Glasyn Gibson	112	19.0	−12.6
Reform	Joseph Day	91	15.4	+15.4
Green	Dylan Brook	27	4.6	+4.6
Labour	Joshua Littler-Jennings	15	2.5	+2.5
Majority		232	39.4	
Turnout		589		
Liberal Democrats hold		Swing		

Blockley By-Election 24 September 2026
Party	Candidate	Votes	%	±%
Conservative	Tom Bradley	431	54.7	+11.0
Liberal Democrats	Danny Loveridge	230	29.2	+29.2
Reform	Matt Fincham	59	7.5	+7.5
Green	Bob Eastoe	54	6.9	−49.4
Labour	Joshua Littler-Jennings	14	1.8	+1.8
Majority		201	25.5	
Turnout		788		
Conservative gain from Green		Swing		
