= Grumbald's Ash Hundred =

Historical division of Gloucestershire, England

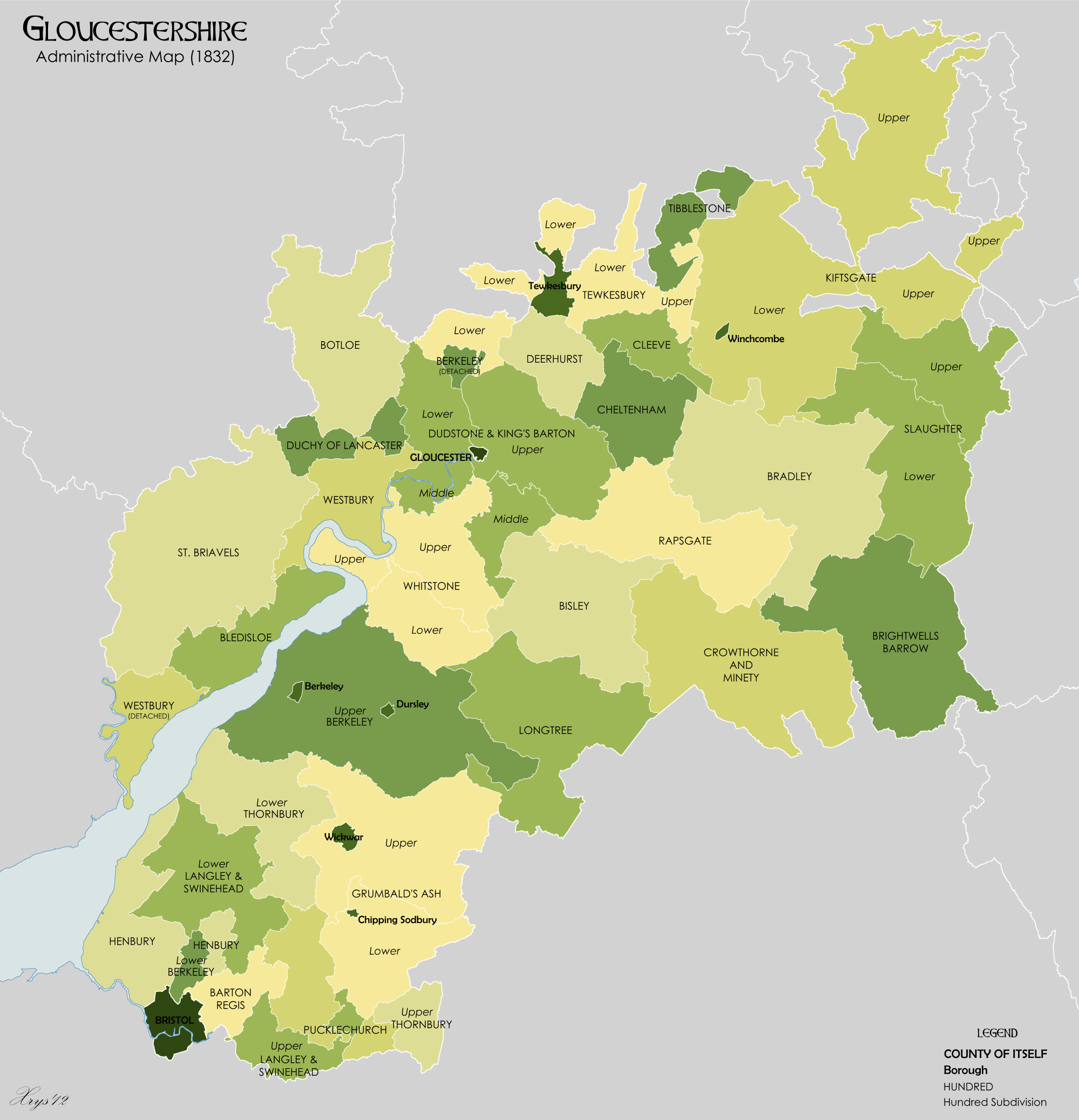
Gloucestershire Hundreds in 1832

Grumbald's Ash Hundred (also spelled Grumbold's Ash) was a subdivision of the county of Gloucestershire, England. Hundreds originated in the late Saxon period and lasted as administrative divisions until the 19th century. It has been reported that the court was originally held under an Ash tree situated in Dodington parish, although this location would not be consistent with the previous split of the hundred. Its name survives in the Grumbolds Ash with Avening electoral ward of Cotswold district council.

The hundred was divided into Upper and Lower divisions and comprised a total of 20 ancient parishes in the southeastern corner of the county. The Lower division comprised Acton Turville, Chipping Sodbury, Little Sodbury, Old Sodbury, Tormarton, West Littleton, Dyrham & Hinton, Wapley & Codrington and Dodington; the Upper division comprised Alderley, Badminton, Boxwell & Leighterton, Charfield, Didmarton, Hawkesbury, Hillesley, Horton, Oldbury-on-the-Hill, Tortworth and Wickwar.

At the time of the Domesday Book, there were three hundreds in this area: Eddredestane, Bagstone and Hagmead, the last also known as Grimboldstow. Eddredestane later formed most of the Lower division of Grumbald's Ash Hundred and the other two the Upper division.

Eddredestone Hundred also included the parish of Marshfield, which later became a detached part of Thornbury Hundred. The survey named four places in this hundred: Marshfield, Sodbury, Dodington and Tormarton. Note West Littleton was formerly a tything of Tormarton. Eddredestone was named after Eadred, King of the English 946-955, who established the "Three Shires Stone" in Marshfield, marking the boundary between Gloucestershire, Somerset and Wiltshire.

Bagstone Hundred included Tortworth, Charfield, Wickwar, Tytherington and Iron Acton, the last two parishes later transferred to Thornbury Hundred. Bagstone is the name of a hamlet in Wickwar parish which was the meeting place of the hundred.

Hagmead Hundred included Hawkesbury, Horton, Badminton, Boxwell, Hillesley, Alderley, Oldbury-on-the-Hill, Little Sodbury and Didmarton, which became part of the Upper Division, plus Acton Turville and Dyrham & Hinton which formed, with Eddredestane, the Lower Division. At the time of Domesday, Wapley was part of Swineshead Hundred, later transferring into the Upper division of Grumbold's Ash.
