= St Arild's Church, Oldbury-on-the-Hill =

Coordinates: 51.5926°N 2.2630°W

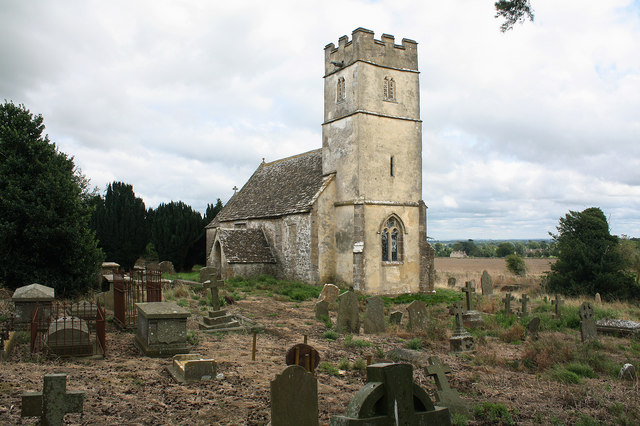
- St Arild's Church, Oldbury-on-the-Hill, from the northwest

- Location in Gloucestershire
- OS grid reference: ST 818 882
- Location: Oldbury-on-the-Hill, Gloucestershire
- Country: England
- Denomination: Anglican

History
- Dedication: Saint Arild

Architecture
- Functional status: Redundant
- Heritage designation: Grade II*
- Designated: 6 September 1964
- Architectural type: Church
- Style: Gothic
- Groundbreaking: 13th century

Specifications
- Materials: Stone, stone slate roof

St Arild's Church is a historic Anglican church near the village of Oldbury-on-the-Hill, Gloucestershire, England under the care of The Churches Conservation Trust. It is recorded in the National Heritage List for England as a designated Grade II* listed building, The church is dedicated to Arilda, a female saint who was a virgin and a martyr. This is one of only two churches dedicated to her, the other being nearby at Oldbury-on-Severn. Access to the church is across fields or through a farmyard.

== History ==
The church originated in the 13th century, although most of its fabric dates from the late 15th or early 16th century. Repairs were carried out in the 18th century.

== Architecture ==
St Arild's is constructed in stone with a stone slate roof. Its style is Perpendicular. The plan consists of a nave and chancel, with a small north porch, and a west tower. The tower is in three stages divided by string courses, with diagonal stepped buttresses in the lowest stage. Also in the lowest stage is a two-light arched west window. The middle stage has a small lancet window on the west side, and on all sides in the highest stage are two-light louvred bell openings. At the top of the tower is a battlemented parapet. The north porch is gabled, and in the north wall is a three-light ogee-headed window. On the south side of the nave are four windows of different types. The east window in the chancel has a three-light window containing Decorated (geometrical) tracery.

Internally there is a tall pointed tower arch. The ceiling is plain and plastered. Some 18th-century box pews are still present on the south side of the church, and there is also a two-tier pulpit.

== See also ==
- List of churches preserved by the Churches Conservation Trust in the English Midlands
