= Francis Doughty (clergyman) =

Francis Doughty (1616 – c. 1670) was an English-American Presbyterian minister.

Doughty was born in Bristol, and was ordained as a priest in the Church of England by William Piers. He served the parishes of Boxwell, Leighterton and Rangeworthy in Gloucestershire. In 1635 he got in trouble by referring to Charles I as "Charles by common election and general consent King of England".

Doughty decided to emigrate to America, going first to Massachusetts, where he probably arrived in 1638. He pastored churches in Taunton and Cohasset, but was persecuted on account of his beliefs regarding infant baptism. He had preached that all children of baptized parents were children of Abraham, and therefore ought to be baptized as well.

Doughty then moved to Long Island, where in 1642, Director of New Netherland Willem Kieft granted him and his associates a large tract of land at Maspeth, "with power to erect a church, and to exercise the Reformed Christian religion which they profess." The following year, however, war with Indians forced him to relocate to New Amsterdam, where he pastored a church in Flushing for five years. He came into conflict with Kieft, and Captain John Underhill ordered his church doors to be shut. Doughty migrated again, and pastored churches in Northampton County, Virginia, Charles County, Maryland, and Rappahannock County, Virginia. In Virginia he became known for "troublesome but unsuccessful witch-hunting proclivities".

William Gray Dixon calls Doughty the "Apostle of Presbyterianism in America", and suggests that his character "seems to have well befitted his name.
