= Boxwell with Leighterton =

- Civil parish
- Interactive map of Boxwell with Leighterton
- Coordinates: 51°37′N 2°16′W
- Country: England
- County: Gloucestershire
- Primary council: Cotswold
- Status: Parish
- Main settlements: Leighterton

Government
  - Type: Parish Council
  - UK Parliament: South Cotswolds

Population (2021)
  - Total: 241
- Website: Boxwell with Leighterton Parish Council

Boxwell with Leighterton is a civil parish in the Cotswold district of Gloucestershire, England. At the 2021 census, it had a population of 241. The parish includes Boxwell and Leighterton.

The adjoining parishes are: Ozleworth to the north-west; Kingscote to the north; Westonbirt with Lasborough to the east; Didmarton to the south; and Hillesley and Tresham to the west. The last is in the Stroud district; the others are in the Cotswold district.

Historically, the parish was in Grumbald's Ash Hundred. From 1894 until 1974 it was in Tetbury Rural District.

== Demographics ==
Census population of Boxwell with Leighterton parish
Census	Population	Female	Male	Households	Source
1801	217	116	101		
1811	254	130	124		
1821	297	158	139		
1831	297	155	142		
1841	334	150	184		
1851	285	128	157		
1881	253	121	132		
1891	266	135	131		
1901	254	119	135	49	
1911	253	120	133	56	
1921	232	114	118	57	
1931	197	99	98	60	
1951	188	95	93	59	
1961	179	81	98	60	
1971	187	91	96		
2001	277	143	134	115	
2011	306	160	146	121	
2021	241	124	117	102	
