= Francis Doughty =

Francis Doughty may refer to:

- Francis Doughty (clergyman) (1616–c. 1670), English-American Presbyterian minister
- Francis W. Doughty (1850–1917), American writer
