= 2015 Cotswold District Council election =

2015 UK local government election

Cotswold District Council Election, 2015
← 2011	7 May 2015	2019 →

All 34 seats to Cotswold District Council
	First party	Second party
Leader	Lynden Stowe	Joe Harris
Party	Conservative	Liberal Democrats
Leader since	9 May 2006	October 2014
Leader's seat	Campden and Vale	Cirencester St Michael's
Last election	27	12
Seats before	30	11
Seats won	24	10
Popular vote	26,442	16,105
Percentage	54.8%	33.4%
- Map of results of 2015 election, with Cirencester shown inset.
Leader of the Council before election
Lynden Stowe
Conservative
Leader of the Council after election
Lynden Stowe
Conservative

The 2015 Cotswold District Council election took place on 7 May 2015 to elect all members of Cotswold District Council in England. The whole council was up for election. Turnout was substantially up across the district due to the election being held on the same day as the general election and other local elections in England.

Boundary changes had reduced the number of seats from 44 to 34, making exact comparisons with 2011 difficult. The election produced a slightly reduced majority for the ruling Conservative Group, with each political party making a gain on the percentage of total votes at the cost of a near wipeout of votes for independent candidates. However other than a single gain by the Liberal Democrats to produce this result no other ward changed hands.

== Results ==
Cotswold District Council election, 2015
Party	Seats	Gains	Losses	Net gain/loss	Seats %	Votes %	Votes	+/−
Conservative	24	0	1	-1	71	54.8	26442	▲3.0
Liberal Democrats	10	1	0	+1	29	33.4	16105	▲5.6
UKIP	0	0	0	0	0	4.6	2,219	▲3.1
Labour	0	0	0	0	0	3.3	1612	▲0.7
Green	0	0	0	0	0	2.7	1,283	▲2.7
Independent	0	0	0	0	0	1.3	622	▼11.9

== Ward results ==
=== Abbey Ward ===
Cirencester Abbey Ward
Party	Candidate	Votes	%	±%
Liberal Democrats	Mark Harris	730	53.2	
Conservative	Tony Curry	509	37.1	
Green	Bob Irving	133	9.7	
Majority		253	10.5	
Turnout			70.57	
Liberal Democrats hold		Swing		

=== Blockley Ward ===
Blockley Ward
Party	Candidate	Votes	%	±%
Conservative	Sue Jepson*	949	62.1	
Liberal Democrats	Bella McMillan-Scott	580	37.9	
Majority		369	24.2	
Turnout			70.21	
Conservative hold		Swing		

=== Bourton Vale Ward ===
Bourton Vale Ward
Party	Candidate	Votes	%	±%
Conservative	Richard Keeling	1,171	72.5	
Liberal Democrats	Malcolm Lilley	444	27.5	
Majority		727	45	
Turnout			71.45	
Conservative hold		Swing		

=== Bourton Village Ward ===
Bourton Village Ward
Party	Candidate	Votes	%	±%
Conservative	Len Wilkins*	675	50.8	
Liberal Democrats	Andy Briars	653	49.2	
Majority		22	1.6	
Turnout			63.54	
Conservative hold		Swing		

=== Campden and Vale Ward ===
Campden and Vale Ward (2 seats)
Party	Candidate	Votes	%	±%
Conservative	Mark Annett*	1,850	57.7	
Conservative	Lynden Stowe*	1,740	54.3	
Liberal Democrats	Danny Loveridge	689	21.5	
Liberal Democrats	Peter Sipthorpe	626	19.5	
UKIP	Rob McNeil-Wilson	552	17.2	
Majority		1,051		
Turnout			71.44	
Conservative hold		Swing		
Conservative hold		Swing		

=== Chedworth and Churn Valley Ward ===
Chedworth and Churn Valley Ward
Party	Candidate	Votes	%	±%
Liberal Democrats	Jennifer Forde	810	50.1	
Conservative	David Broad*	808	49.9	
Majority		2	0.2	
Turnout			78.24	
Liberal Democrats gain from Conservative		Swing		

=== Chesterton Ward ===
Cirencester Chesterton Ward
Party	Candidate	Votes	%	±%
Liberal Democrats	Roly Hughes	602	45.9	
Conservative	Phil Kerton	414	31.6	
UKIP	Robert Stephens	169	12.9	
Green	Sabrina Poole	127	9.7	
Majority		195	14.3	
Turnout			68.16	
Liberal Democrats hold		Swing		

=== Coln Valley Ward ===
Coln Valley Ward
Party	Candidate	Votes	%	±%
Conservative	Raymond Theodoulou*	1,027	68.8	
Liberal Democrats	Frank Skinner	281	18.8	
Green	Xanthe Messenger	184	12.3	
Majority		746	50	
Turnout			74.22	
Conservative hold		Swing		

=== Ermin Ward ===
Ermin Ward
Party	Candidate	Votes	%	±%
Conservative	Nicholas Parsons*	921	58.1	
Liberal Democrats	Jane Edwards	519	32.8	
UKIP	Adrian Blake	144	9.1	
Majority		402	25.3	
Turnout			75.64	
Conservative hold		Swing		

=== Fairford North Ward ===
Fairford North Ward
Party	Candidate	Votes	%	±%
Conservative	Abagail Beccle	644	51.1	
Liberal Democrats	Andy Rickell	351	27.8	
UKIP	Peter Brown	266	21.1	
Majority		293	23.3	
Turnout			70.27	
Conservative hold		Swing		

=== Fosseridge Ward ===
Fosseridge Ward
Party	Candidate	Votes	%	±%
Conservative	Julian Beale*	1,152	71.6	
Liberal Democrats	Peter Ellis	230	14.3	
Green	Ailsa Spindler	227	14.1	
Majority		922	57.3	
Turnout			74.34	
Conservative hold		Swing		

=== Four Acres Ward ===
Cirencester Four Acres Ward
Party	Candidate	Votes	%	±%
Liberal Democrats	Ray Brassington	549	52.5	
Conservative	Philip Dinkel	360	34.4	
Green	Frances Mary Johnson	136	13	
Majority		189	18.1	
Turnout			69.56	
Liberal Democrats hold		Swing		

=== Grumbolds Ash with Avening Ward ===
Grumbolds Ash with Avening Ward
Party	Candidate	Votes	%	±%
Conservative	Jim Parsons*	1,108	71.5	
Liberal Democrats	Felicity Hornby	442	28.5	
Majority		666	43	
Turnout			75.42	
Conservative hold		Swing		

=== Kemble Ward ===
Kemble Ward
Party	Candidate	Votes	%	±%
Conservative	Tony Berry	969	62.2	
Liberal Democrats	Nicky Baber	430	27.6	
UKIP	John Fleming	158	10.2	
Majority		539	34.6	
Turnout			75.85	
Conservative hold		Swing		

=== Lechlade, Kempsford and Fairford South Ward ===
Lechlade, Kempsford and Fairford South Ward (2 seats)
Party	Candidate	Votes	%	±%
Conservative	Sue Coakley*	1,798	57.0	
Conservative	Stephen Andrews	1,572	49.8	
Liberal Democrats	Lee Glendon	633	20.1	
Labour	Trevor Smith	423	13.4	
UKIP	Carol Smith	384	12.2	
Liberal Democrats	Shane Poole	323	10.2	
UKIP	Geoff Willis	283	9.0	
Majority		939		
Turnout			73.05	
Conservative hold		Swing		
Conservative hold		Swing		

=== Moreton East Ward ===
Moreton East Ward
Party	Candidate	Votes	%	±%
Conservative	Robert Dutton*	866	67.3	
Labour	Jude Walker	234	18.2	
Liberal Democrats	Tim Harris	186	14.5	
Majority		632	49.1	
Turnout			67.25	
Conservative hold		Swing		

=== Moreton West Ward ===
Moreton West Ward
Party	Candidate	Votes	%	±%
Conservative	Alison Coggins	986	76.9	
Liberal Democrats	Tori Walker	296	23.1	
Majority		690	53.8	
Turnout			66.92	
Conservative hold		Swing		

=== New Mills Ward ===
Cirencester New Mills Ward
Party	Candidate	Votes	%	±%
Liberal Democrats	Tatyan Cheung	647	55.6	
Conservative	Lynn Hilditch	516	44.4	
Majority		131	11.2	
Turnout			59.66	
Liberal Democrats gain from Conservative		Swing		

=== Northleach Ward ===
Northleach Ward
Party	Candidate	Votes	%	±%
Conservative	Chris Hancock*	908	57.6	
Liberal Democrats	Laura Watts	553	35.1	
Labour	Merilyn Hill	114	7.2	
Majority		355	22.5	
Turnout			71.81	
Conservative hold		Swing		

=== Sandywell Ward ===
Sandywell Ward
Party	Candidate	Votes	%	±%
Conservative	Robin Hughes*	1,145	70.6	
Liberal Democrats	Roberta Crawley	477	29.4	
Majority		668	41.2	
Turnout			75.60	
Conservative hold		Swing		

=== Siddington and Cerney Rural Ward ===
Siddington and Cerney Rural Ward
Party	Candidate	Votes	%	±%
Conservative	Shaun Parsons	702	51.5	
Liberal Democrats	Jordan McKenna	662	48.5	
Majority		40	3	
Turnout			69.28	
Conservative hold		Swing		

=== South Cerney Village Ward ===
South Cerney Village
Party	Candidate	Votes	%	±%
Liberal Democrats	Juliet Layton*	707	48.6	
Conservative	Michael Darlington	433	29.8	
Independent	Alan Dickinson	314	21.6	
Majority		274	18.8	
Turnout			73.96	
Liberal Democrats hold		Swing		

=== St Michael's Ward ===
Cirencester St Michael's Ward
Party	Candidate	Votes	%	±%
Liberal Democrats	Joe Harris*	665	50.1	
Conservative	David Henson	422	31.8	
UKIP	Ken Parsons	118	8.9	
Green	Robert Elliott	90	6.8	
Independent	Matt Helm	33	2.5	
Majority		243	18.3	
Turnout			68.50	
Liberal Democrats hold		Swing		

=== Stow Ward ===
Stow Ward
Party	Candidate	Votes	%	±%
Conservative	Barry Dare*	783	56.1	
Liberal Democrats	Mike Curtis	613	43.9	
Majority		170	12.2	
Turnout			66.53	
Conservative hold		Swing		

=== Stratton Ward ===
Cirencester Stratton Ward
Party	Candidate	Votes	%	±%
Liberal Democrats	Patrick Coleman*	810	51.9	
Conservative	Malcolm Gilmore	595	38.1	
Green	Joy Irving	156	10	
Majority		215	13.8	
Turnout			76.74	
Liberal Democrats hold		Swing		

=== Tetbury East and Rural Ward ===
Tetbury East and Rural Ward
Party	Candidate	Votes	%	±%
Conservative	Maggie Heaven	733	61.0	
Liberal Democrats	Francesca Cooper	246	20.5	
Labour	Jon Easterbrook	222	18.5	
Majority		487	40.5	
Turnout			75.54	
Conservative hold		Swing		

=== Tetbury Town Ward ===
Tetbury Town Ward
Party	Candidate	Votes	%	±%
Conservative	Stephen Hirst*	517	47.1	
Independent	Kevin Painter	271	24.7	
Labour	Jason Stevens	219	20	
Liberal Democrats	Gary Selwyn*	91	8.3	
Majority		246	22.4	
Turnout			67.21	
Conservative hold		Swing		

=== Tetbury with Upton Ward ===
Tetbury with Upton Ward
Party	Candidate	Votes	%	±%
Conservative	Tina Stevenson	768	61.5	
Labour	Christopher Giles	248	19.9	
Liberal Democrats	Steven Goldblatt	233	18.6	
Majority		520	41.6	
Turnout			71.20	
Conservative hold		Swing		

=== The Ampneys and Hampton Ward ===
The Ampneys and Hampton Ward
Party	Candidate	Votes	%	±%
Conservative	David Fowles*	1,055	62.9	
Liberal Democrats	Chris Twells	621	37.1	
Majority		434	26	
Turnout			75.85	
Conservative hold		Swing		

=== The Beeches Ward ===
Cirencester Beeches
Party	Candidate	Votes	%	±%
Liberal Democrats	Nigel Robbins OBE	543	39.5	
Conservative	Stuart Tarr	488	35.5	
UKIP	Claire Eddleston	190	13.8	
Labour	Terry Pomroy	154	11.2	
Majority		55	4	
Turnout			64.69	
Liberal Democrats hold		Swing		

=== The Rissingtons Ward ===
The Rissingtons Ward
Party	Candidate	Votes	%	±%
Conservative	Mark Mackenzie-Charrington	738	66.4	
Green	Andrew Maclean	230	20.7	
Liberal Democrats	Joanna Walker	143	12.9	
Majority		508	45.7	
Turnout			73.33	
Conservative hold		Swing		

=== Watermoor Ward ===
Cirencester Watermoor
Party	Candidate	Votes	%	±%
Liberal Democrats	Jenny Hincks*	637	48.7	
Conservative	Geoffrey Adams	432	33.0	
UKIP	Peter Elliot	238	18.2	
Majority		205	15.7	
Turnout			61.55	
Liberal Democrats hold		Swing		

== By-elections between 2015 and 2019 ==
=== Stow ===
A by-election was held on Thursday 29 September 2016 for the Stow ward due to the death of Conservative councillor Barry Dare. The subsequent election was won by the Liberal Democrats.

Stow Ward by-election
Party	Candidate	Votes	%	±%
Liberal Democrats	Dilys Neill	555	64.9	+21.0
Conservative	David Penman	300	35.1	−21.0
Majority		255	29.8	
Turnout		855	40.5	
Liberal Democrats gain from Conservative		Swing	21%	

=== Fairford North ===
A by-election was held on Thursday 9 February 2017 for the Fairford North ward due to the resignation of Conservative councillor Abigail Beccle. The subsequent election was won by the Liberal Democrats.

Fairford North Ward by-election
Party	Candidate	Votes	%	±%
Liberal Democrats	Andrew Doherty	610	68.1	+40.2
Conservative	Dominic Morris	270	30.1	−20.9
Green	Xanthe Messenger	15	1.8	+1.8
Majority		270	38.0	
Turnout		897	46.57	
Liberal Democrats gain from Conservative		Swing	30.6%	

=== Grumbolds Ash with Avening ===
A by-election was held on Thursday 23 November 2017 for the Grumbolds Ash with Avening Ward due to the death of Conservative councillor Jim Parsons. The subsequent election was won by the Conservatives.

Grumbolds Ash with Avening Ward by-election
Party	Candidate	Votes	%	±%
Conservative	Richard Morgan	420	64.7	−6.8
Liberal Democrats	Nicola Baber	136	21.0	−7.5
Labour	Edward Shelton	93	14.3	+14.3
Majority		284	43.7	
Turnout		654	31.52	
Conservative hold		Swing		
