= Codrington, Gloucestershire =

Settlement in South Gloucestershire, England

Coordinates: 51.512°N 2.394°W

Codrington
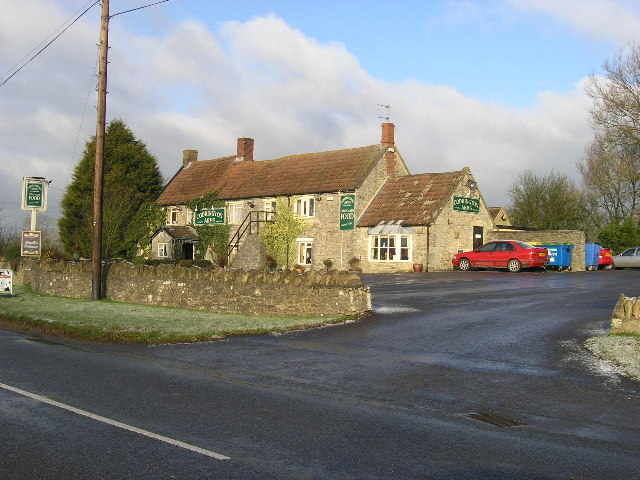
- Codrington Arms

- Location within Gloucestershire
- Civil parish: Dodington
- Unitary authority: South Gloucestershire
- Ceremonial county: Gloucestershire
- Region: South West
- Country: England
- Sovereign state: United Kingdom
- Post town: Bristol
- Postcode district: BS37
- Police: Avon and Somerset
- Fire: Avon
- Ambulance: South Western

Codrington is a hamlet in South Gloucestershire, England, situated alongside the B4465 road. It is in Dodington parish, and was formerly in the civil parish of Wapley and Codrington until 1935, and in the hundred of Grumbald's Ash.

Codrington had one pub, the Wishing Well, which was formerly the Codrington Arms. The pub was linked to the Codrington Family, who used to be based at Codrington Court before moving to nearby Dodington Park. The area also has a Baptist church in Wapley Road. Now the area is best known for its golf course on the outskirts called The Players Club. The hamlet is mentioned in Lemon Jelly's "Ramblin' Man".
