= Arilda of Oldbury =

Early medieval female Christian saint

Saint Arilda
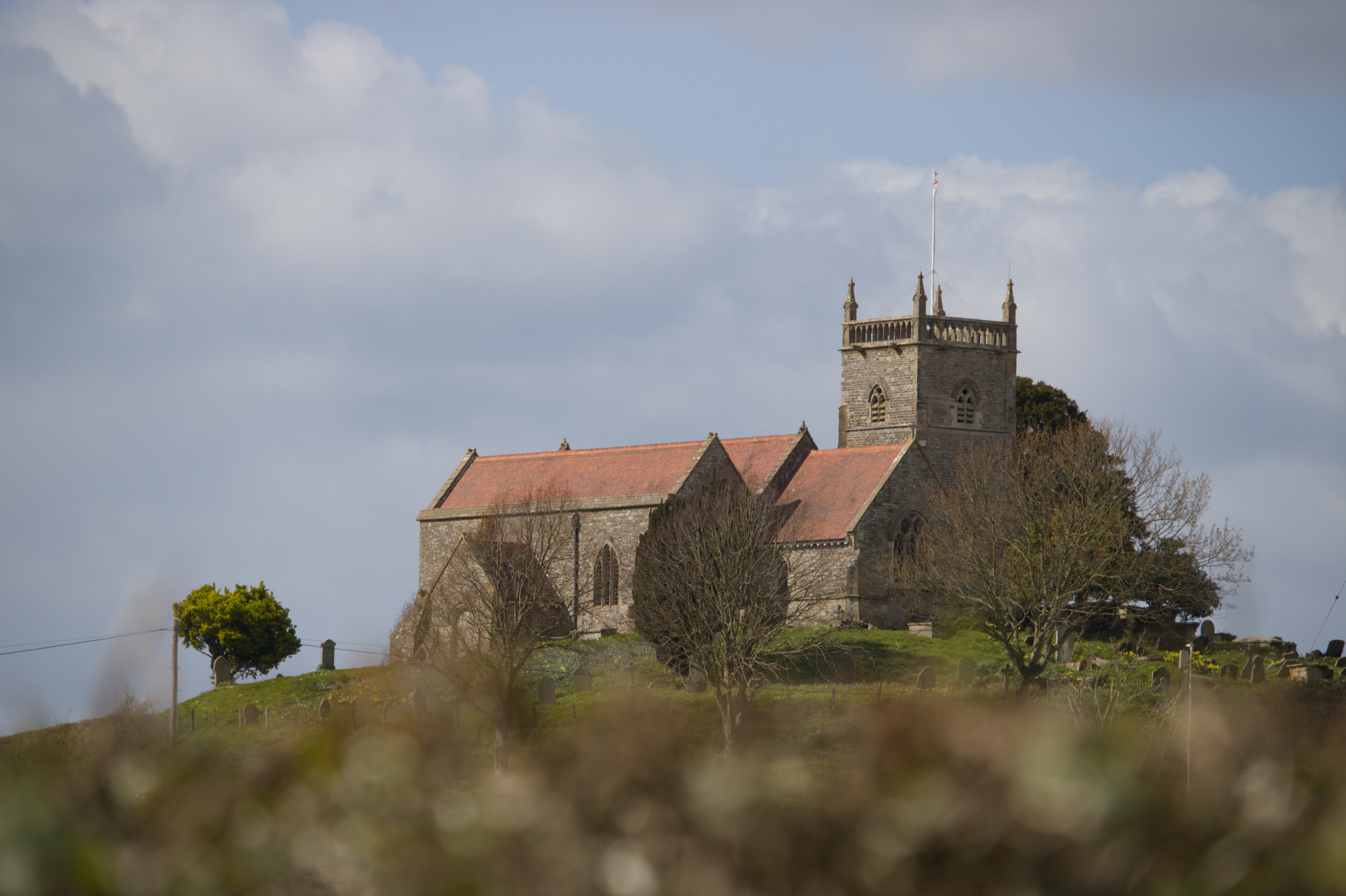

Virgin martyr
- Born: unknown possibly Gloucestershire or Wales
- Died: 5th or 6th-century Oldbury-on-Severn, Gloucestershire
- Venerated in: Roman Catholic Church; Anglican Communion
- Major shrine: St Peter's Abbey, Gloucester (destroyed)
- Feast: 20 July
- Patronage: Oldbury-on-Severn and Oldbury-on-the-Hill, Gloucestershire

Saint Arilda, or Saint Arild, was a female saint from Oldbury-on-Severn in the English county of Gloucestershire. She probably lived in the 5th- or 6th-century and may have been of either Anglo-Saxon or Welsh origin.

Arilda was a virgin martyr who, according to John Leland, was slain by a youth named Municus when she refused to have sex with him.

Two churches in Gloucestershire are dedicated to Arilda, one at Oldbury-on-Severn near her traditional home, a second (St Arild's Church) at Oldbury-on-the-Hill. Both places were called "Aldberie" at the time of the Domesday Book in 1086, suggesting that their names may be derived from the saint.

Leland claims that Arilda lived in Kington, a hamlet in the parish of Oldbury-on-Severn, where there is a holy well bearing Arilda's name. The waters from the well are said to run red with her blood, though a more prosaic explanation is the presence of a red alga of the genus Hildenbrandia.

There was a shrine to Arilda at St Peter's Abbey, Gloucester, which is now Gloucester Cathedral, but it was destroyed after the Dissolution of the Monasteries.
