= Didmarton =

Village in Gloucestershire, England

Coordinates: 51.586°N 02.262°W

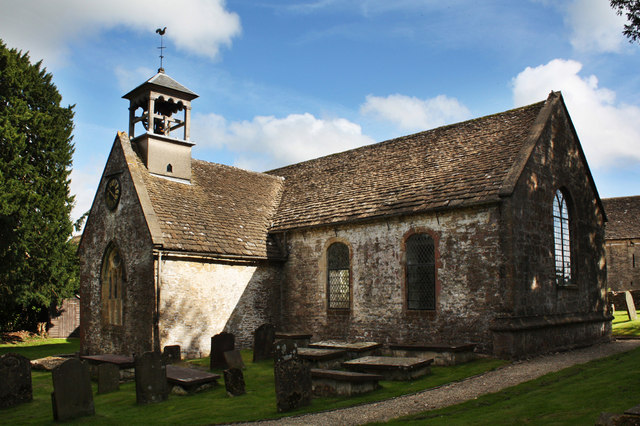
- Didmarton St Lawrence Church has an unusual open bell tower.

- Location within Gloucestershire
- Population: 415 (2011)
- OS grid reference: ST819875
- District: Cotswold
- Shire county: Gloucestershire
- Region: South West
- Country: England
- Sovereign state: United Kingdom
- Post town: Badminton
- Postcode district: GL9
- Dialling code: 01454
- Police: Gloucestershire
- Fire: Gloucestershire
- Ambulance: South Western
- UK Parliament: South Cotswolds

Didmarton is a village and civil parish in Gloucestershire, England. It lies in the Cotswold District, about 6 miles (10 km) southwest of Tetbury. The parish is on the county borders with South Gloucestershire (to the southwest) and Wiltshire (to the south and southeast).

Since 25 March 1883, the civil parish has included the former parish of Oldbury-on-the-Hill.

== History ==
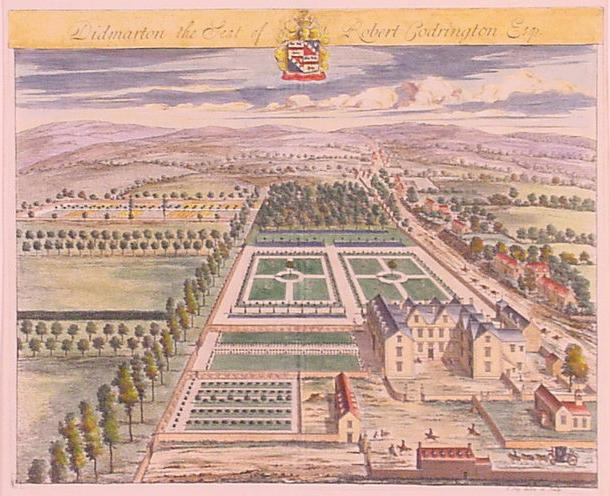
Copper engraving by Jan Kip entitled Didmarton, the Seat of Robert Codrington, Esq. from Britannia Illustrata, 1709

A military survey of Didmarton in 1522 shows that it was then a very small village, overshadowed by the neighbouring Oldbury-on-the-Hill.

In the 16th century, the manor of Didmarton was owned by the Seacole family. In 1571, Simon Codrington married Agnes, daughter and co-heiress of Richard Seacole, and the estate thus passed to their son Robert Codrington. It was sold to Charles Somerset, 4th Duke of Beaufort, in about 1750, but has had a succession of other owners since then.

Together with Oldbury, the parish was subject to enclosure in 1829.

According to The National Gazetteer of Great Britain and Ireland (1868):

DIDMARTON, a parish in the upper division of the hundred of Grumbald's Ash, in the county of Gloucester, 5 miles S.W. of Tetbury, and 9 N.E. of Yate station. It is situated near the river Avon, and consists of a few farmhouses. The living is a rectory in the diocese of Gloucester and Bristol, annexed to the rectory of Oldbury-on-the-Hill. The church, dedicated to St Lawrence, is an ancient stone edifice in the early English style of architecture. The charities amount to £11 per annum. There is a school for the children of this parish and that of Oldbury-on-the-Hill. Roman coins are frequently found. The Duke of Beaufort is lord of the manor. A fair was once held here on St Lawrence's Day (3 February), which is now transferred to Lansdown, near Bath.

In 1935, the parish's boundaries changed as a result of the County of Gloucester Review Order 1935, with part of the then parish of Hawkesbury including Saddlewood Manor transferring to become part of Didmarton parish. This now forms the northern edge of the Didmarton parish boundaries, adjoining Boxwell with Leighterton.

== Places of worship ==
St Laurence's church at Didmarton (Church of England) is an early English building with a later open bell tower, unusual in England. Archaeological work has suggested an origin in the 12th century. The church's dedication is to St Laurence of Canterbury, whose feast day is on 3 February.

The village's Congregational church is a square stone building with arched sash windows.

Another Anglican church at the western end of the village, once dedicated to St Michael and All Angels, has been converted to a private house, although its churchyard is still consecrated ground.

== Public houses ==
The village's present-day pub, the King's Arms, was first mentioned in 1772. The former George Inn dated from at least 1791, and the former Compasses Inn (or Three Compasses) from 1798.

== Local names ==
Parish registers from 1674 to 1991 are held at the Gloucestershire Record Office.

Surnames in the marriages register for 1675 to 1751 are: Acton, Allen, Biggs, Bishop, Brooks, Brush, Burcombe, Byrton, Carey, Chapman, Chappel(l), Codrington, Collings, Davies, Drew, Emely, Frith, Gingill, Harris, Hatchett, Heaven, Iddols, Kingscott, Lewis, Milsum, Minchin, Porter, Powel, Power, Robbins, Scrope, Shipton, Smart, Sparkes, Taunton, Thompson, Walls, Watts, Weekes, White, and Witchell.

The surnames recorded in the parish graveyard, and in that of the Didmarton Congregational church, include: Baker, Bickerton, Borham, Cox, Gould, Hatherell, Inane, Lucas, Pritchard, Short, Rice, Robbins, Till, and Tuck.
