= William Gray Dixon =

Scottish Presbyterian minister and writer

William Gray Dixon (1854–1928) was a Scottish Presbyterian minister.

Dixon was born in Paisley, Scotland, and studied at Ayr Academy and the University of Glasgow. In 1876 he was appointed Professor of the English Language and Literature at the Imperial College of Engineering in Tokyo. Dixon returned to Scotland in 1880, and studied theology at New College, Edinburgh. He then moved to Melbourne and was ordained a minister of the Presbyterian Church of Victoria. He later pastored churches in Warrnambool and Auckland. Dixon served as Moderator of the General Assembly of the Presbyterian Church of New Zealand and lectured at Knox College, Otago.

Dixon wrote The Land of the Morning (1882), about Japan, and The Romance of the Catholic Presbyterian Church (1930), a history of Presbyterianism.
