= Leighterton =

Village in Gloucestershire, England

Coordinates: 51.617°N 2.257°W

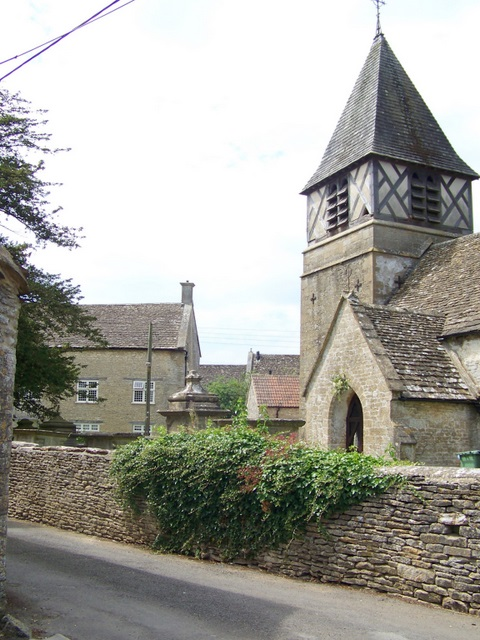
- The Church of St Andrew

- Location within Gloucestershire
- OS grid reference: ST823909
- Civil parish: Boxwell with Leighterton
- District: Cotswold
- Shire county: Gloucestershire
- Region: South West
- Country: England
- Sovereign state: United Kingdom
- Post town: TETBURY
- Postcode district: GL8
- Dialling code: 01666
- Police: Gloucestershire
- Fire: Gloucestershire
- Ambulance: South Western
- UK Parliament: South Cotswolds

Leighterton is a village in rural Gloucestershire off the A46. It sits within the civil parish of Boxwell with Leighterton, 4.25 miles west-southwest of Tetbury, towards the southern end of the Cotswolds AONB. Situated in the Cotswold hills, it is 175 metres above sea level. Historically, it was situated within the hundred of Grumbald's Ash.

The village's parish church, dedicated to St Andrew, is a Grade II listed building. Originally built in the 13th century and with a porch dating from the 14th century, it underwent a restoration in 1877. The patronage of the church formerly belonged to Walsingham Priory and Gloucester Abbey, later passing to the Huntley family of Boxwell Court.

There are over a dozen listed buildings within the village built with Cotswold limestone, including the 19th century Royal Oak pub and the former village hall.

A long barrow, located just outside the village, is listed as a scheduled monument. An example of a Cotswold-Severn megalithic chamber tomb, it is 220 feet in length with burial likely to date from between 3800BC and 3625BC.

The manor of Leighterton is recorded as being held by Humphrey de Bohun in 1373 and by Robert Stanshaw in 1473, part of the Stanshaw family of Little Sodbury Manor.

The village is located in the Grumbolds Ash with Avening Cotswold district council ward, the Tetbury Gloucestershire county council electoral division and the South Cotswolds parliamentary constituency.
