= Oldbury-on-the-Hill =

Village in Gloucestershire, England

Coordinates: 51.59°N 02.26°W

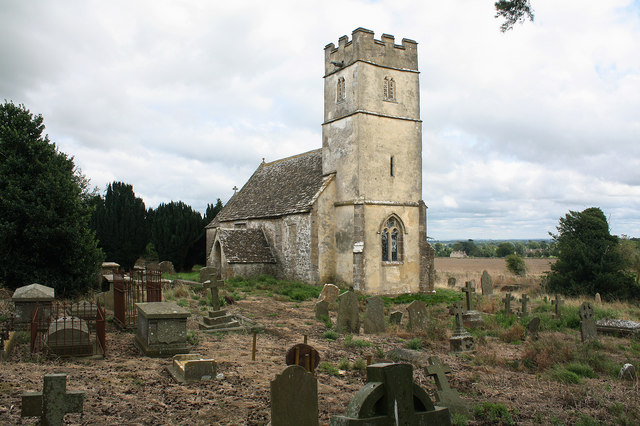
- St Arild's Church

- Location within Gloucestershire
- OS grid reference: ST8082
- Civil parish: Didmarton
- District: Cotswold
- Shire county: Gloucestershire
- Region: South West
- Country: England
- Sovereign state: United Kingdom
- Post town: Badminton
- Postcode district: GL9
- Police: Gloucestershire
- Fire: Gloucestershire
- Ambulance: South Western
- UK Parliament: South Cotswolds

Oldbury-on-the-Hill is a village in the civil parish of Didmarton, in the Cotswold district, in Gloucestershire, England, ninety-three miles west of London and less than one-mile (1.6 km) north of the village of Didmarton.

== History ==
Oldbury-on-the-Hill has been inhabited since prehistoric times, and Nan Tow's Tump, a round barrow beside the A46 road, is a Bronze Age earthwork and archaeological site. The tree-grown barrow is about thirty metres in diameter and three metres high. The name refers to Nan Tow, said to have been a local witch who was buried upright in the barrow.

The parishes of Oldbury-on-the-Hill and Didmarton were together surrounded on all sides by the parish of Hawkesbury and the county boundary with Wiltshire, which is taken to suggest that they were anciently part of Hawkesbury.

The Domesday Book of 1086 calls the village Aldeberie. Before 1066, it was held by Eadric, Sheriff of Wiltshire, and in 1086 by Ernulf de Hesdin. A document of 972 gives the name as Ealdanbyri, meaning 'old fortification'. A possible derivation from the name of St Arilda has also been suggested.

In 1342, the tithe of hay and other lesser tithes in Didmarton and Oldbury-on-the-Hill belonging to Badminton church were assessed at £4 13s. 4d.

Together with neighbouring Didmarton, the parish was subject to enclosure by the Didmarton and Oldbury-on-the-Hill Inclosure Act 1829 (10 Geo. 4. c. 4 Pr.).

Benjamin Clarke's British Gazetteer (1852) says:

OLDBURY-ON-THE-HILL, Gloucester, a parish in the upper division of the hundd. of Grumbald's Ash, union of Tetbury: 135 miles (217 km) from London (coach road 102), 6 from Tetbury, 8 from Malmesbury - Gt. West. Rail. through Bristol to Charfield, thence 3 miles (4.8 km): from Derby, through Birmingham to Charfield, &c. 117 miles (188 km), Money orders issued at Tetbury: London letters delivd. 9 a.m.: post closes 4 p.m. The living, a rectory with that of Didmorton, in the diocese of Gloucester and Bristol, is valued at £16: pres. net income, £250: patron, Duke of Beaufort: pres. incumbent, E. J. Everard, 1840: contains 1,870 acres (7.6 km^{2}): 84 houses: popn. in 1841, 483: assd. propr. £2,329: poor rates in 1848, £165. 9s.

According to The National Gazetteer of Great Britain and Ireland (1868):

OLDBURY-ON-THE-HILL, a parish in the upper division of the hundred of Grumbald's Ash, county Gloucester, 5 miles (8.0 km) S.W. of Tetbury. Chippenham is its post town. The village, which is of small extent, is situated among the Cotswold hills. The tithes have been commuted for a rent-charge of £245. The living is a rectory with the rectory of Didmarton annexed, in the diocese of Gloucester and Bristol, joint value £387. The church, dedicated to St Arild or St Ariva, is a small ancient structure. There is a village school supported by the Duchess of Beaufort.

In 1881 the civil parish had a population of 386. On 25 March 1883 the parish was incorporated into the parish of Didmarton, the two having shared a Rector since 1735.

== Parish records ==
Parish registers for Oldbury-on-the-Hill survive from as early as 1568, and all surviving records for the period 1568 to 1978 are deposited at the Gloucester Record Office.

Monumental inscriptions from St Arilda's churchyard include the names Alcock, Baker, Bayliss, Chappell, Clark, Cockram, Dale, Fry, Gunter, Hatherell, Hatherle, Holborow, Holobrow, Long, Pirtt, Rice, Thompson, Toghill, Verrinder, Walker, Watts, Webb, White, and Yorke.

== Parish church ==
The earliest record so far found of a church at Oldbury-on-the-Hill occurs in 1273, when there is a mention of a ‘free chapel’ there. In 1291, the Rector of Great Badminton had a portion of 8s. and 6d. in the chapel of Oldbury. The oldest part of the present medieval parish church of Oldbury is estimated to date from the 14th century.

The church shares its ancient dedication to St Arilda with the church of Oldbury-on-Severn, some twenty miles (32 km) away. St Arilda was a Gloucestershire virgin and martyr who lived at an uncertain time before the Norman Conquest of England at Kington, near Thornbury, which is now in the parish of Oldbury-on-Severn. Her feast day is 20 July.

St Arilda's at Oldbury-on-the-Hill has been declared redundant, so is no longer used for regular worship.
