= Boxwell =

Coordinates: 51.62°N 02.27°W

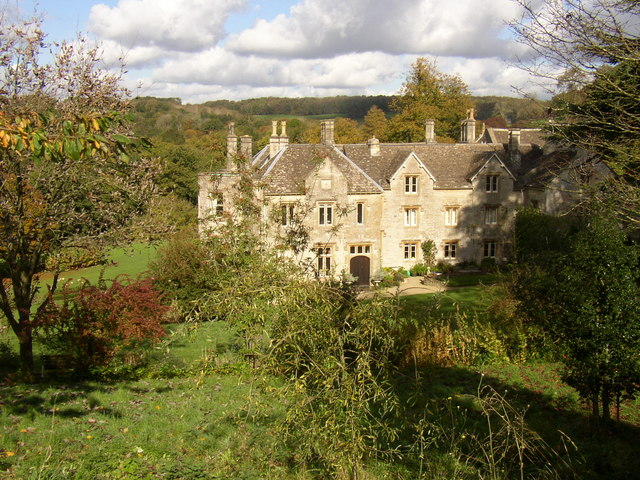
- Boxwell Court

- Location within Gloucestershire
- OS grid reference: ST8192
- Shire county: Gloucestershire
- Region: South West
- Country: England
- Sovereign state: United Kingdom
- Police: Gloucestershire
- Fire: Gloucestershire
- Ambulance: South Western
- UK Parliament: South Cotswolds

Boxwell is a hamlet in Gloucestershire, England, near the village of Leighterton

Boxwell Court is a Grade II* listed manor house from the 15th or 16th century.
