= 2011 Cotswold District Council election =

English local election

Cotswold District Council election, 2011
← 2007	5 May 2011	[[2015 Cotswold District Council election|2015]] →

44 out of 44 seats to Cotswold District Council 23 seats needed for a majority
- Turnout: 34,092 (50.2%)

	First party	Second party
Party	Conservative	Liberal Democrats
Last election	38 seats, 58.0%	4 seats, 24.0%
Seats before	38	4
Seats after	27	12
Seat change	▼11	▲8
Popular vote	18,423	10,240
Percentage	51.8%	28.8%
Swing	▼6.2%	▲4.8%
	Third party	Fourth party
Party	Independent	Labour
Last election	2 seats, 17.0%	N/A
Seats before	2	0
Seats after	5	0
Seat change	▲3	0
Popular vote	4685	922
Percentage	13.2%	2.6
Swing	▼4.8%	N/A
- Results of the election 2011
Leader before election
Lynden Stowe
Conservative
Leader after election
Lynden Stowe
Conservative

Elections for Cotswold District Council were held on Thursday 5 May 2011. The whole council was up for election. Cotswold District is divided into 28 wards, with a total of 44 seats up for election.

== Results summary ==
Despite winning the majority of votes in the election, the Conservatives lost 12 seats, 8 to the Liberal Democrats and 4 to Independents. However, they still retained majority control of the council.

Cotswold local election results 2011
Party	Seats	Gains	Losses	Net gain/loss	Seats %	Votes %	Votes	+/−
Conservative	27	1	12	▼11	61.4	51.8	18423	▼6.2
Liberal Democrats	12	8	0	▲8	27.3	28.8	10240	▲4.8
Independent	5	4	1	▲3	11.4	13.2	4685	▼3.8
Labour	0	0	0	Steady	0.0	2.6	922	N/A
Green	0	0	0	Steady	0.0	2.2	776	N.A
UKIP	0	0	0	Steady	0.0	1.5	541	▲0.5

== Ward results ==
Ampney-Coln
Party	Candidate	Votes	%	±%
Conservative	Sir Edward Horsfall	584	74.3	
Liberal Democrats	Frank Skinner	202	25.7	
Majority		382	48.6	
Turnout		797	50.83	
Conservative hold		Swing		

Avening
Party	Candidate	Votes	%	±%
Conservative	Jim Parsons	534	68.2	
Liberal Democrats	Peter Burgess	153	19.5	
UKIP	David Bendall	96	12.3	
Majority		381		
Turnout		783		
Conservative hold		Swing		

Beacon-Stow (2 seats)
Party	Candidate	Votes	%	±%
Conservative	Davin Penman	857	56.3	
Conservative	Merryl Phillips	703	---	
Independent	Colin Smalley	703	30.5	
Independent	Christopher Turner	258	---	
Liberal Democrats	George Ellis	200	13.1	
Majority				
Turnout				
Conservative hold		Swing		
Conservative hold		Swing		

Blockley
Party	Candidate	Votes	%	±%
Conservative	Barry Dare	489	58.4	
Liberal Democrats	Sarah Keay-Bright	348	41.6	
Majority				
Turnout				
Conservative hold		Swing		

Bourton-on-the-Water (2 seats)
Party	Candidate	Votes	%	±%
Conservative	Sheila Jeffery	884	71.8	
Conservative	Leonard Wilkins	868	---	
Liberal Democrats	Sarah Keay-Bright	347	28.2	
Majority				
Turnout				
Conservative hold		Swing		
Conservative hold		Swing		

Campden-Vale (3 seats)
Party	Candidate	Votes	%	±%
Conservative	Lynden Stowe	1,662	67.0	
Conservative	Susan Jepson	1,641	---	
Conservative	Mark Annett	1,588	---	
Liberal Democrats	Clive Thompson	819	33.0	
Majority				
Turnout				
Conservative hold		Swing		
Conservative hold		Swing		
Conservative hold		Swing		

Chedworth
Party	Candidate	Votes	%	±%
Conservative	David Broad	453	53.5	
Independent	John Robons	393	46.5	
Majority				
Turnout				
Conservative hold		Swing		

Churn Valley
Party	Candidate	Votes	%	±%
Liberal Democrats	Paul Hodgkinson	532	59.2	
Conservative	Vanessa Powell	397	40.8	
Majority				
Turnout				
Liberal Democrats hold		Swing		

Cirencester Beeches (2 seats)
Party	Candidate	Votes	%	±%
Conservative	John Burgess	629	51.1	
Liberal Democrats	Jonathan Hughes	602	48.9	
Conservative	Peter Braidwood	598	---	
Liberal Democrats	Nigel Robbins	574	46.5	−−−
Majority				
Turnout				
Conservative hold		Swing		
Liberal Democrats gain from Conservative		Swing		

Cirencester Chesterton (2 seats)
Party	Candidate	Votes	%	±%
Liberal Democrats	Deryck Nash	682	48.6	
Liberal Democrats	Margaret Rickman	561	---	
Conservative	Phillip Kerton	407	29.0	
Conservative	John Anderson	399	---	
Labour	Jonathan Easterbrook	169	12.0	
UKIP	Peter Braidwood	146	10.4	
Majority				
Turnout				
Liberal Democrats hold		Swing		
Liberal Democrats hold		Swing		

Cirencester Park (2 seats)
Party	Candidate	Votes	%	±%
Liberal Democrats	Lee Searles	769	57.5	
Liberal Democrats	Joseph Harris	735	---	
Conservative	Geoffrey Adams	568	42.5	
Conservative	Anthony Curry	509	---	
Majority				
Turnout				
Liberal Democrats gain from Conservative		Swing		
Liberal Democrats gain from Conservative		Swing		

Cirencester Stratton-Whiteway (2 seats)
Party	Candidate	Votes	%	±%
Liberal Democrats	Andrew Lichnowski	816	48.8	
Liberal Democrats	Patrick Coleman	757	---	
Conservative	Dennis Peters	502	30.0	
Conservative	Richard Buckley	428	---	
Green	Robert Irving	182	10.9	
Labour	Reginald Eyre	173	10.3	
Majority				
Turnout				
Liberal Democrats gain from Conservative		Swing		
Liberal Democrats hold		Swing		

Cirencester Watermoor (2 seats)
Party	Candidate	Votes	%	±%
Liberal Democrats	Gary Selwyn	804	60.7	
Liberal Democrats	Jenny Hincks	741	---	
Conservative	William Helm	520	39.3	
Conservative	Steven White	433	---	
Majority				
Turnout				
Liberal Democrats gain from Conservative		Swing		
Liberal Democrats gain from Conservative		Swing		

Ermin
Party	Candidate	Votes	%	±%
Conservative	Nicholas Parsons	490	56.5	
Liberal Democrats	Jane Edwards	336	38.8	
UKIP	Adrian Blake	41	4.7	
Majority				
Turnout				
Conservative hold		Swing		

Fairford (2 seats)
Party	Candidate	Votes	%	±%
Conservative	Raymond Theodoulou	750	36.5	
Independent	Mark Wardle	711	34.6	
Conservative	Christine Roberts	670	---	
Liberal Democrats	Sean Davey	387	18.9	
Liberal Democrats	Anna Lewis	231	---	
Green	Xanthe Messenger	205	10.0	
Majority				
Turnout				
Conservative hold		Swing		
Independent gain from Conservative		Swing		

Fosseridge
Party	Candidate	Votes	%	±%
Conservative	Michele Jeffery	638	78.7	
Liberal Democrats	Richard Derrington	173	21.3	
Majority				
Turnout				
Conservative hold		Swing		

Grumbolds Ash
Party	Candidate	Votes	%	±%
Conservative	Anne Nicolle	665	78.0	
Liberal Democrats	Felicity Hornby	188	22.0	
Majority				
Turnout				
Conservative hold		Swing		

Hampton
Party	Candidate	Votes	%	±%
Conservative	John Fowles	525	58.5	
Independent	James Steel	288	25.4	
Liberal Democrats	Martin Harwood	144	16.1	
Majority				
Turnout				
Conservative hold		Swing		

Kempsford-Lechlade (2 seats)
Party	Candidate	Votes	%	±%
Conservative	Sandra Carter	932	48.2	
Independent	Susan Coakley	781	40.4	
Conservative	Alexander Palmer	726	---	
Independent	Jeremy Stokes	502	---	
Green	Neil Voller	222	11.5	
Majority				
Turnout				
Conservative hold		Swing		
Independent gain from Conservative		Swing		

Moreton-in-Marsh (2 seats)
Party	Candidate	Votes	%	±%
Conservative	Robert Dutton	796	46.6	
Independent	Rodney Hooper	776	45.4	
Conservative	Christopher Horne	536	---	
Independent	Patrick Trice-Rolph	220	---	
Liberal Democrats	Nigel Bass	136	8.0	
Majority				
Turnout				
Conservative hold		Swing		
Independent gain from Conservative		Swing		

Northleach
Party	Candidate	Votes	%	±%
Independent	Christopher Hancock	427	52.7	
Conservative	Michael Pezet	313	38.6	
Liberal Democrats	Darren McLauchlan	70	8.6	
Majority				
Turnout				
Independent gain from Conservative		Swing		

Rissingtons
Party	Candidate	Votes	%	±%
Conservative	Venetia Crosbie-Dawson	602	76.1	
Liberal Democrats	Christine Watson	189	23.9	
Majority				
Turnout				
Conservative hold		Swing		

Riversmeet
Party	Candidate	Votes	%	±%
Conservative	Carole Topple	497	62.0	
Liberal Democrats	Laura Watts	240	29.9	
Labour	Merilyn Hill	65	8.1	
Majority				
Turnout				
Conservative hold		Swing		

Sandywell
Party	Candidate	Votes	%	±%
Conservative	Robin Hughes	577	73.1	
Liberal Democrats	Roberta Crawley	212	26.9	
Majority				
Turnout				
Conservative hold		Swing		

Tetbury (3 seats)
Party	Candidate	Votes	%	±%
Independent	Stephen Hirst	905	30.0	
Conservative	Barry Gibbs	834	27.7	
Conservative	Diana Hicks	627	---	
Liberal Democrats	Kevin Painter	577	19.2	
Conservative	Keith Leaver	560	---	
Independent	Peter Martin	467	---	
Labour	Shirley Mosdell	371	12.3	
Labour	Christopher Giles	292	---	
Liberal Democrats	Leslie Brown	277	---	
Liberal Democrats	Stephen Radford-Hancock	236	---	
Independent	Brian Edge	169	---	
Green	Brecon Quaddy	167	5.5	
UKIP	Guy Parfitt	158	5.2	
Majority				
Turnout				
Independent hold		Swing		
Conservative gain from Independent		Swing		
Conservative hold		Swing		

Thames Head
Party	Candidate	Votes	%	±%
Conservative	John Birch	591	66.0	
Liberal Democrats	James Willis	204	22.8	
UKIP	Jennifer Knight	100	11.2	
Majority				
Turnout				
Conservative hold		Swing		

Three Rivers
Party	Candidate	Votes	%	±%
Conservative	Dominic Collier	727	83.5	
Labour	Alan Pollock	144	16.5	
Majority				
Turnout				
Conservative hold		Swing		

Water Parl (3 seats)
Party	Candidate	Votes	%	±%
Liberal Democrats	Esmond Jenkins	1,110	51.9	
Liberal Democrats	Juliet Layton	1,058	---	
Conservative	Clive Bennett	1,030	48.1	
Liberal Democrats	Michael Evemy	1018	---	
Conservative	Adrian Snow	766	---	
Conservative	Peter Messenger	684	---	
Majority				
Turnout				
Liberal Democrats gain from Conservative		Swing		
Liberal Democrats gain from Conservative		Swing		
Conservative hold		Swing		
