= Boxwell Court =

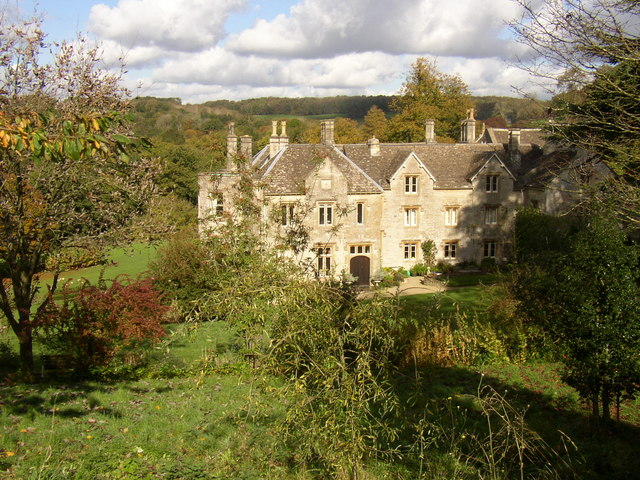
- Boxwell Court photographed from the Monarch's Way

- Location in Gloucestershire
- 51°37′58.5″N 02°16′22″W
- Location: Leighterton, Gloucestershire, England

Boxwell Court is a country house near Leighterton in Gloucestershire, England, about 5 km or 3 miles east of Wotton-under-Edge, dating from the 15th and 16th centuries. It is a Grade II* listed building.

== History ==
The house is thought to be the site of a former monastery, associated with Gloucester Abbey. Nothing remains of the monastery or nunnery except a holy well.

The estate was given to the Huntley family following Henry VIII's dissolution of the monasteries. The House has been in the Huntley family continuously since that time; it is believed that the family have lived on the site for 600 years. The estate is approximately 1,000 acres (4.0 km^{2}), which although large in today's terms, is small compared to the size of the Huntleys' former Gloucestershire estates which included Woodchester and Frocester. The estate is known for its box wood, which used to provide a very large income to the Huntleys.

The house has been frequented by royalty; Prince Rupert stayed in the house on several occasions. There is a story that King Charles II, when fleeing from the Battle of Worcester, stayed on the estate and, in gratitude to the family, gave them his ring which remains in the family's possession. The Monarch's Way which runs past the house is a 625-mile (1,006 km) long-distance footpath that approximates the escape route taken by King Charles II in 1651.

== Architecture ==
The limestone L-shaped building has stone slate roofs. It has two storeys plus an attic. The house has been revised and remodelled many times over the centuries, giving it an irregular appearance. The north front has a door in the centre with a fanlight above it. The side of the building to the west was remodelled in 1796 and has bow and curved sash windows below a parapet. The southern side has two projecting wings. The courtyard has a curtain wall and a castellated entrance.

== St Mary's Church ==
In the grounds of the house is a small Grade II* listed church, St Mary's Boxwell. It was built in the 13th century and the north aisle was added in the 14th. The church contains memorials to the Huntley family.
