= 2023 Cotswold District Council election =

2023 English local election

- 4 May 2023

All 34 seats to Cotswold District Council 18 seats needed for a majority
- Turnout: 40.7%

	First party	Second party
Leader	Joe Harris	Tony Berry (defeated)
Party	Liberal Democrats	Conservative
Last election	18 seats, 44.5%	14 seats, 38.9%
Seats won	22	9
Seat change	▲4	▼5
Popular vote	13,372	12,220
Percentage	47.0%	42.9%
Swing	▲2.5%	▲4.0%
	Third party	Fourth party
Party	Green	Independent
Last election	1 seat, 5.0%	1 seat, 5.7%
Seats won	2	1
Seat change	▲1	Steady
Popular vote	1,573	1,041
Percentage	5.5%	3.7%
Swing	▲0.5%	▼2.0%
- Winner of each seat at the 2023 Cotswold District Council election
Leader before election
Joe Harris
Liberal Democrats
Leader after election
Joe Harris
Liberal Democrats

The 2023 Cotswold District Council election took place on 4 May 2023 to elect all 34 members of Cotswold District Council in Gloucestershire, England. It was held on the same day as other local elections in England.

The Liberal Democrats won 22 seats, an increase of four, and retained control of the council. The Conservatives won nine seats, the Green Party won two and an independent won one. The Conservative group leader, Tony Berry, lost his seat in Kemble.

== Summary ==
=== Election result ===
2023 Cotswold District Council election
Party	Candidates	Seats	Gains	Losses	Net gain/loss	Seats %	Votes %	Votes	+/−
Liberal Democrats	31	22	5	1	▲4	64.7	47.0	13,372	▲2.5
Conservative	34	9	1	6	▼5	26.5	42.9	12,220	▲4.0
Green	11	2	1	0	▲1	5.9	5.5	1,573	▲0.5
Independent	6	1	0	0	Steady	2.9	3.7	1,041	▼2.0
Labour	3	0	0	0	Steady	0.0	0.6	174	▼2.5
Heritage	1	0	0	0	Steady	0.0	0.2	67	N/A
TUSC	1	0	0	0	Steady	0.0	0.1	31	N/A

=== Tetbury with Upton ===
The successful Liberal Democrat candidate in Tetbury with Upton, Chris Twells, was serving as the councillor for Salford City Council's Ordsall ward at the time of the close of nominations. Following his election to Cotswold District Council, he resigned from Salford City Council.

== Ward results ==
The ward results were as follows.

=== Abbey ===
Cirencester Abbey
Party	Candidate	Votes	%	±%
Liberal Democrats	Mark Harris*	504	62.2	−13.0
Conservative	Jackie Tarleton	233	28.8	+12.1
Green	Erin Hughes	73	9.0	New
Majority		271	33	
Turnout		810	43.64	
Liberal Democrats hold		Swing	-12.6	

=== Blockley ===
Blockley
Party	Candidate	Votes	%	±%
Green	Clare Turner	518	56.3	+38.0
Conservative	Sue Jepson*	402	43.7	−12.5
Majority		116	12.6	
Turnout		920	43.58	
Green gain from Conservative		Swing		

=== Bourton Vale ===
Bourton Vale
Party	Candidate	Votes	%	±%
Conservative	Len Wilkins	518	60.9	−3.5
Liberal Democrats	George Fenton	262	30.8	−4.8
Green	Joe Eastoe	70	8.2	N/A
Majority		256	30.1	
Turnout		850	40.60	
Conservative hold		Swing		

=== Bourton Village ===
Bourton Village
Party	Candidate	Votes	%	±%
Liberal Democrats	Jon Wareing	425	50.3	−4.7
Conservative	Madan Samuel	420	49.7	+4.7
Majority		5	0.6	−9.4
Turnout		845	34.88	
Liberal Democrats hold		Swing		

=== Campden and Vale ===
Campden and Vale (2 seats)
Party	Candidate	Votes	%	±%
Conservative	Tom Stowe*	1,271	66.1	+20.1
Conservative	Gina Blomefield*	1,258	65.4	+16.2
Liberal Democrats	Danny Loveridge	604	31.4	+2.5
Liberal Democrats	Rupert Potter	497	25.8	N/A
Majority		654	34.0	
Turnout		1924	38.38	
Conservative hold				
Conservative hold				

=== Chedworth and Churn Valley ===
Chedworth and Churn Valley
Party	Candidate	Votes	%	±%
Liberal Democrats	Paul Hodgkinson	576	64.0	+6.4
Conservative	Shaun Parsons	324	36.0	+18.3
Majority		252	28.0	
Turnout		900	48.34	
Liberal Democrats hold		Swing		

=== Chesterton ===
Cirencester Chesterton
Party	Candidate	Votes	%	±%
Liberal Democrats	Roly Hughes*	398	63.9	+7.0
Conservative	Peter Braidwood	155	24.9	+10.4
Green	Michael Poole	70	11.2	New
Majority		243	39.0	
Turnout		623	35.40	
Liberal Democrats hold		Swing		

=== Coln Valley ===
Coln Valley
Party	Candidate	Votes	%	±%
Conservative	John Fowles	480	52.2	−6.5
Liberal Democrats	Tristan Wilkinson	440	47.8	+24.0
Majority		40	4.3	
Turnout		920	48.47	
Conservative hold		Swing		

=== Ermin ===
Ermin
Party	Candidate	Votes	%	±%
Conservative	Julia Judd*	581	64.9	+7.0
Liberal Democrats	Ed Smith	314	35.1	−7.0
Majority		267	29.8	
Turnout		895	43.32	
Conservative hold		Swing		

=== Fairford North ===
Fairford North
Party	Candidate	Votes	%	±%
Liberal Democrats	Michael Vann	406	51.5	−17.7
Conservative	Tom Dutton	316	40.1	+9.3
Heritage	James Nicholls	67	8.5	N/A
Majority		90	11.4	
Turnout		789	40.57	
Liberal Democrats hold		Swing		

=== Fosseridge ===
Fosseridge
Party	Candidate	Votes	%	±%
Conservative	David Cunningham	563	65.6	−3.1
Liberal Democrats	Anthony McGarel-Groves	295	34.4	+3.1
Majority		268	31.2	
Turnout		858	41.58	
Conservative hold		Swing		

=== Four Acres ===
Cirencester Four Acres
Party	Candidate	Votes	%	±%
Liberal Democrats	Ray Brassington*	395	66.1	−3.5
Conservative	Rob Gibson	203	33.9	+10.0
Majority		192	32.1	
Turnout		598	39.99	
Liberal Democrats hold		Swing		

=== Grumbolds Ash with Avening ===
Grumbolds Ash with Avening
Party	Candidate	Votes	%	±%
Conservative	Tony Slater	488	61.4	+0.1
Liberal Democrats	Joanna Walker	307	38.6	+15.7
Majority		181	22.8	
Turnout		795	41.62	
Conservative hold		Swing		

=== Kemble ===
Kemble
Party	Candidate	Votes	%	±%
Liberal Democrats	Mike McKeown	665	56.9	N/A
Conservative	Tony Berry*	479	41.0	−16.9
Independent	Charlotte Smith	25	2.1	N/A
Majority		186	15.9	
Turnout		1169	52.70	
Liberal Democrats gain from Conservative		Swing		

=== Lechlade, Kempsford and Fairford South ===
Lechlade, Kempsford and Fairford South (2 seats)
Party	Candidate	Votes	%	±%
Liberal Democrats	Clare Muir	1,150	56.5	+26.2
Liberal Democrats	Helene Mansilla	976	48.0	N/A
Conservative	Stephen Andrews*	785	38.6	−13.4
Conservative	Steve Trotter*	776	38.2	−13.6
Labour	Esme Barlow Hall	131	6.4	N/A
Labour	Trevor Smith	114	5.6	−9.1
Majority		191		
Turnout		2034	44.21	
Liberal Democrats gain from Conservative				
Liberal Democrats gain from Conservative				

=== Moreton East ===
Moreton East
Party	Candidate	Votes	%	±%
Liberal Democrats	Angus Jenkinson	436	42.7	−20.1
Conservative	Tom Bradley	407	39.9	+6.2
Independent	Chas Allen	108	10.6	N/A
Green	Sue Berry	69	6.8	N/A
Majority		29	2.8	
Turnout		1020	40.34	
Liberal Democrats hold		Swing		

=== Moreton West ===
Moreton West
Party	Candidate	Votes	%	±%
Conservative	Daryl Corps	451	51.5	+6.7
Liberal Democrats	Craig Thurling	362	41.3	−13.9
Green	Bob Eastoe	63	7.2	N/A
Majority		89	10.2	
Turnout		876	46.14	
Conservative gain from Liberal Democrats		Swing		

=== New Mills ===
Cirencester New Mills
Party	Candidate	Votes	%	±%
Liberal Democrats	Claire Bloomer*	382	72.9	−3.0
Conservative	Lynn Hilditch	142	27.1	+3.0
Majority		240	45.8	
Turnout		524	29.00	
Liberal Democrats hold		Swing		

=== Northleach ===
Northleach
Party	Candidate	Votes	%	±%
Liberal Democrats	Tony Dale*	511	50.5	−11.7
Conservative	Becca Amory	427	42.2	+4.4
Green	Hannah Grayson-Gaito	74	7.3	N/A
Majority		84	8.3	
Turnout		1012	45.79	
Liberal Democrats hold		Swing		

=== Sandywell ===
Sandywell
Party	Candidate	Votes	%	±%
Conservative	Jeremy Theyer	448	53.7	−13.3
Liberal Democrats	Alan McLellan	386	46.3	+21.4
Majority		62	7.4	
Turnout		834	40.85	
Conservative hold		Swing		

=== Siddington and Cerney Rural ===
Siddington and Cerney Rural
Party	Candidate	Votes	%	±%
Liberal Democrats	Mike Evemy*	530	65.9	−5.5
Conservative	Richard Davies	274	34.1	+5.5
Majority		256	31.8	
Turnout		804	35.71	
Liberal Democrats hold		Swing		

=== South Cerney Village ===
South Cerney Village
Party	Candidate	Votes	%	±%
Liberal Democrats	Juliet Layton*	481	63.7	−20.0
Conservative	Helen Roffe	274	36.3	+20.0
Majority		207	27.4	
Turnout		755	35.43	
Liberal Democrats hold		Swing		

=== St Michael's ===
Cirencester St Michael's
Party	Candidate	Votes	%	±%
Liberal Democrats	Joe Harris*	512	68.4	−4.5
Conservative	Chris Vaughan	236	31.6	+12.2
Majority		276	36.9	
Turnout		748	40.77	
Liberal Democrats hold		Swing		

=== Stow ===
Stow
Party	Candidate	Votes	%	±%
Liberal Democrats	Dilys Neill*	436	57.9	−7.4
Conservative	David Thorpe	290	38.5	+3.8
Independent	Agnieszka Wright	27	3.6	N/A
Majority		146	19.4	
Turnout		753	37.06	
Liberal Democrats hold		Swing		

=== Stratton ===
Cirencester Stratton
Party	Candidate	Votes	%	±%
Liberal Democrats	Patrick Coleman*	516	56.7	−0.4
Conservative	Jill Rixon	278	30.5	+17.3
Green	Bob Irving	85	9.3	N/A
TUSC	Gunther Strait	31	3.4	N/A
Majority		238	26.2	
Turnout		910	44.34	
Liberal Democrats hold		Swing		

=== Tetbury East and Rural ===
Tetbury East and Rural
Party	Candidate	Votes	%	±%
Independent	Nikki Ind*	635	76.7	+3.2
Conservative	Jenny Knight	193	23.3	−3.2
Majority		442	53.4	
Turnout		828	40.57	
Independent hold		Swing		

=== Tetbury Town ===
Tetbury Town
Party	Candidate	Votes	%	±%
Liberal Democrats	Ian Watson	336	50.5	+31.0
Conservative	Stephen Hirst*	183	27.5	−12.8
Independent	Ann Pearce	104	15.6	N/A
Labour	Symon Bye	43	6.5	N/A
Majority		153	23.0	
Turnout		666	33.94	
Liberal Democrats gain from Conservative		Swing		

=== Tetbury with Upton ===
Tetbury with Upton
Party	Candidate	Votes	%	±%
Liberal Democrats	Christopher Twells	267	37.6	+28.5
Conservative	Peter Coleman	207	29.2	−18.8
Independent	Kevin Painter	142	20.0	N/A
Green	Michael Wagner	94	13.2	N/A
Majority		60	8.5	
Turnout		710	41.80	
Liberal Democrats gain from Conservative		Swing		

=== The Ampneys and Hampton ===
The Ampneys and Hampton
Party	Candidate	Votes	%	±%
Liberal Democrats	Lisa Spivey*	614	57.5	−1.0
Conservative	Lottie Goldstone	454	42.5	+1.0
Majority		160	15.0	
Turnout		1068	50.59	
Liberal Democrats hold		Swing		

=== The Beeches ===
Cirencester Beeches
Party	Candidate	Votes	%	±%
Liberal Democrats	Nigel Robbins*	406	55.5	−24.1
Conservative	Adam Limb	251	34.3	+13.9
Green	Lucy Schlappa	74	10.1	N/A
Majority		155	21.2	
Turnout		731	33.65	
Liberal Democrats hold		Swing		

=== The Rissingtons ===
The Rissingtons
Party	Candidate	Votes	%	±%
Green	Andrew Maclean*	383	56.6	+4.0
Conservative	Esther Trinder	294	43.4	−4.0
Majority		89	13.1	
Turnout		677	34.60	
Green hold		Swing		

=== Watermoor ===
Cirencester Watermoor
Party	Candidate	Votes	%	±%
Liberal Democrats	Gary Selwyn*	446	69.8	+12.0
Conservative	Mackenzie Vaughan	193	30.2	+18.5
Majority		253	39.6	
Turnout		639	32.32	
Liberal Democrats hold		Swing		

== Changes since the election ==
=== Changes 2023–2027 ===
Chris Twells was suspended from the Liberal Democrats shortly after the election and sat as an independent. The council's first published political composition after the election therefore recorded 21 Liberal Democrats, nine Conservatives, two Greens and two non-grouped independents. Twells joined the Liberal Party in July 2024, before returning to sit as an independent in November 2024.

== By-elections ==
=== Lechlade, Kempsford & Fairford South ===
Lechlade, Kempsford and Fairford South, 14 December 2023
Party	Candidate	Votes	%	±%
Liberal Democrats	Tristan Wilkinson	705	48.5	−8.0
Conservative	Stephen Andrews	624	42.9	+4.3
Labour	Anna Mainwaring	73	5.0	−1.4
Independent	Marshall Regan	53	3.6	N/A
Majority		81	5.6	
Turnout		1,455	31.72	
Liberal Democrats hold				

The by-election followed the resignation of Liberal Democrat councillor Clare Muir on 7 November 2023 for personal reasons.

=== Cirencester Chesterton ===
Cirencester Chesterton, 16 January 2025
Party	Candidate	Votes	%	±%
Liberal Democrats	Andrea Ann Pellegram	296	48.1	–15.8
Reform	Jill Rixon	152	24.7	N/A
Conservative	Ryan Dhindsa	106	17.2	–7.7
Labour	Andrew Farmer	61	9.9	N/A
Majority		144	23.4	–15.6
Turnout		615	35.37	
Liberal Democrats hold				

The by-election followed the resignation of Liberal Democrat councillor Roly Hughes on 28 November 2024.

=== Tetbury with Upton ===
Tetbury with Upton, 1 May 2025
Party	Candidate	Votes	%	±%
Conservative	Laura Hall-Wilson	318	40.3	+11.1
Liberal Democrats	Pauline Foster	277	35.1	–2.5
Reform	Elizabeth Nagle	130	16.5	N/A
Green	Michael Graeme Wagner	49	6.2	–7.0
Labour	Josh Littler-Jennings	16	2.0	N/A
Majority		41	5.2	
Turnout		790	46.19	
Conservative gain from Liberal Democrats				

The by-election followed Chris Twells's resignation from the council on 19 March 2025.

=== Cirencester Watermoor ===
Cirencester Watermoor, 1 May 2025
Party	Candidate	Votes	%	±%
Liberal Democrats	Nick Bridges	330	48.7	−21.1
Reform	Lisa Marsden	163	24.0	N/A
Conservative	McKenzie Fuller	101	14.9	−15.3
Labour	Andy Farmer	45	6.6	N/A
Green	Tony Cima	39	5.8	N/A
Majority		167	24.6	
Turnout		678	31.82	
Liberal Democrats hold				

The by-election followed the resignation of Liberal Democrat councillor Gary Selwyn on 24 March 2025.

=== The Rissingtons ===
The Rissingtons by-election, 22 January 2026
Party	Candidate	Votes	%	±%
Liberal Democrats	Craig Andrew Thurling	321	37.5	N/A
Conservative	Alastair Watson	268	31.3	–12.1
Reform	Matt Fincham	221	25.8	N/A
Green	Bob Eastoe	47	5.5	–51.1
Majority		53	6.2	
Turnout		857	42.89	
Liberal Democrats gain from Green		Swing		

The by-election followed the resignation of Green councillor Andrew Maclean after he was diagnosed with a brain tumour.

=== The Beeches ===
The Beeches by-election, 12 March 2026
Party	Candidate	Votes	%	±%
Liberal Democrats	Paul Evans	390	52.7	−2.8
Reform	Mackenzie Jayne Vaughan	168	22.7	N/A
Conservative	Ben Shaw	122	16.5	−17.8
Green	Bob Irving	53	7.2	−2.9
Labour	Joshua Littler-Jennings	7	0.9	N/A
Majority		222	30	+8.8
Turnout		740	33.80	
Liberal Democrats hold		Swing		

The by-election followed the resignation of Liberal Democrat councillor Nigel Robbins, who retired after nearly 13 years as a district and county councillor.

=== St Michael's ===
St Michael's by-election, 2 July 2026
Party	Candidate	Votes	%	±%
Liberal Democrats	Naomi Bloomer	344	58.4	−10.0
Conservative	Glasyn Gibson	112	19.0	−12.6
Reform	Joseph Day	91	15.4	N/A
Green	Dylan Brook	27	4.6	N/A
Labour	Joshua Littler-Jennings	15	2.5	N/A
Majority		232	39.4	
Turnout		589	32.23	
Liberal Democrats hold		Swing		

The by-election followed the resignation of former council leader Joe Harris.

=== Blockley ===
Blockley by-election, 24 September 2026
Party	Candidate	Votes	%	±%
Conservative	Tom Bradley	431	54.7	+11.0
Liberal Democrats	Danny Loveridge	230	29.2	New
Reform	Matt Fincham	59	7.5	New
Green	Bob Eastoe	54	6.9	−49.5
Labour	Josh Littler-Jennings	14	1.8	New
Majority		201	25.5	+12.9
Rejected ballots		1	0.1	
Turnout		790	37.4	−6.2
Registered electors		2,111		
Conservative gain from Green		Swing	+30.3	

The by-election was triggered by the resignation of Green councillor Clare Turner, with new work commitments being cited as the reason for her resignation.
