= Oldbury-on-Severn =

Village and civil parish in Gloucestershire, England

Coordinates: 51°38′N 2°34′W

Oldbury-on-Severn is a small village near the mouth of the River Severn in the South Gloucestershire district of the county of Gloucestershire in the west of England. The parish, which includes the village of Cowhill had a population at the 2011 census of 780. It is home to the nearby Oldbury nuclear power station, a Magnox power station which opened in 1967 and ceased operation on 29 February 2012.

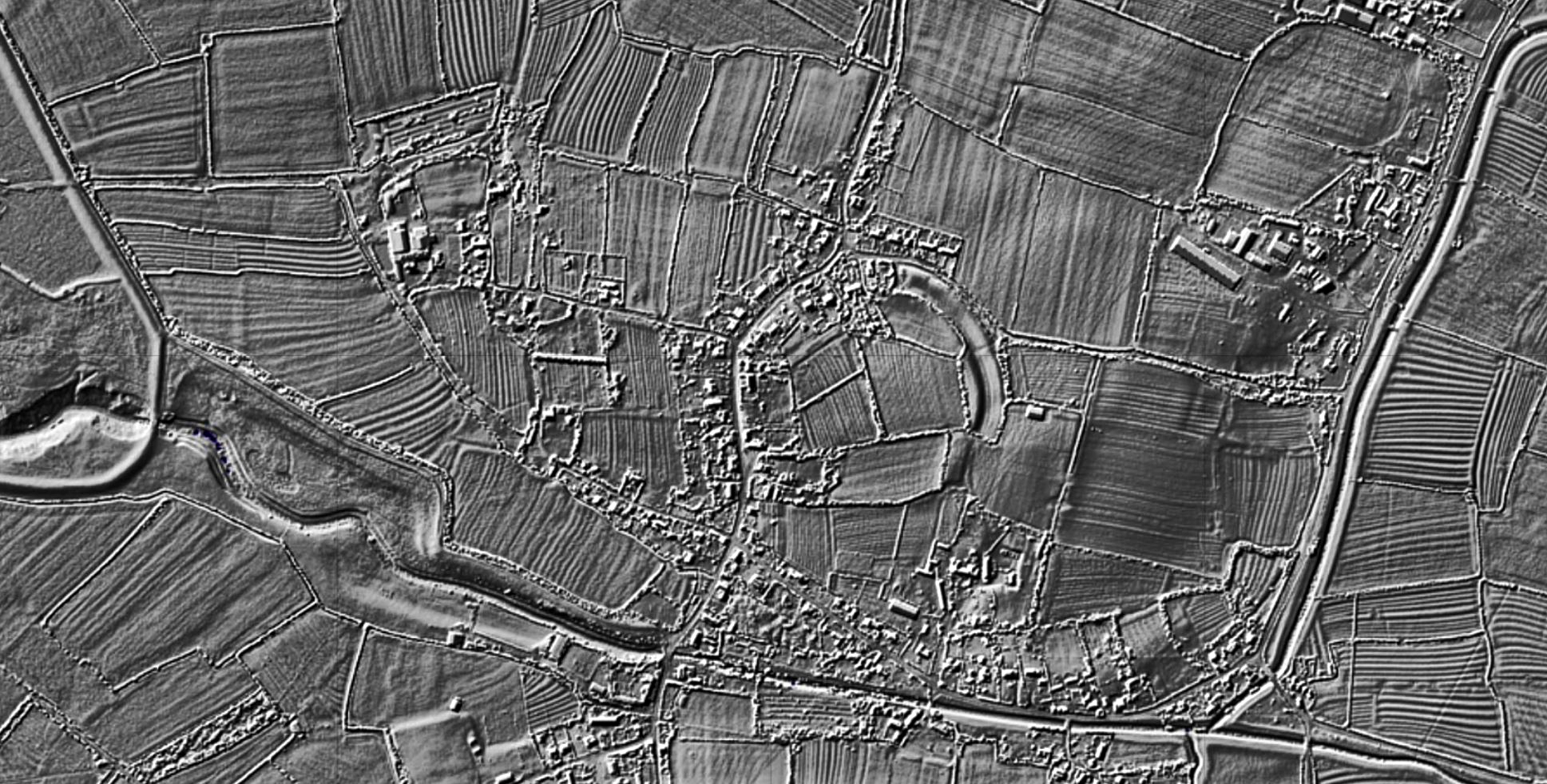
A lidar view of the village and Iron Age fort.

The village is the site of an Iron Age fort called Oldbury Camp. Older maps refer to this as a Roman camp and also refer to another Roman camp surrounding St Arilda's Church.

Village attractions include a footpath near the river, a pub known as the Anchor Inn plus the village hall and two churches. It is also the home of Thornbury Sailing Club.

The Anchor Inn is British heritage listed building. It was originally built as a mill house in the 18th century and rewindowed in the early 19th century.

The parish church is dedicated to St Arilda, a local saint and martyr whose origins may lie in the fourth or fifth century. The church is on a small hill (35m asl at ST609919) and is an excellent viewpoint, and, for river travellers, waymark.
