= 2019 Cotswold District Council election =

2019 UK local government election

- 2 May 2019

All 34 seats to Cotswold District Council 18 seats needed for a majority

| | First party | Second party |
|---|---|---|
| Leader | Joe Harris | Tony Berry |
| Party | Liberal Democrats | Conservative |
| Leader since | November 2014 | December 2018 |
| Last election | 10 seats, 33.4% | 24 seats, 54.8% |
| Seats won | 18 | 14 |
| Seat change | ▲8 | ▼10 |
| Popular vote | 12,255 | 12,163 |
| Percentage | 42.2% | 41.9% |
| Swing | ▲11.1% | ▼15.9% |
| | Third party | Fourth party |
| Party | Independent | Green |
| Last election | 0 seats, 1.3% | 0 seats, 2.7% |
| Seats won | 1 | 1 |
| Seat change | ▲1 | ▲1 |
| Popular vote | 1,570 | 1,370 |
| Percentage | 5.4% | 4.7% |
| Swing | ▲4.4% | ▲2.3% |
- Map of results of 2019 election, with Cirencester shown inset.
Leader of the council before election
Tony Berry
Conservative
Leader of the council after election
Joe Harris
Liberal Democrats

The 2019 Cotswold District Council election took place on 2 May 2019 to elect all members of Cotswold District Council, as part of the United Kingdom local elections. The Conservatives had controlled the council since 2003 but lost ten seats. The Liberal Democrats won overall control of the council for the first time since the council's creation in 1974. The Green Party also won their first seat on the council since the council's creation.

The Tetbury Town ward was decided by one vote. The returning officer reportedly decided the seat by allocating a doubtful ballot paper that had the word "BREXIT" written across it with an arrow pointing to the Conservative candidate, Stephen Hirst, in favour of Hirst. The hitherto tied candidate, Independent David Painter, described it as a "travesty of justice" and said "no wonder people are turned off voting". Painter sought to raise £2,500 to begin a legal challenge against the returning officer's decision. The council maintained that the returning officer's decision was in line with guidance from the Electoral Commission.

== Summary ==
=== Election result ===
2019 Cotswold District Council election
| Party | Candidates | Seats | Gains | Losses | Net gain/loss | Seats % | Votes % | Votes | +/− |
|---|---|---|---|---|---|---|---|---|---|
| Liberal Democrats | 29 | 18 | 8 | 0 | ▲8 | 52.9 | 42.2 | 12,255 | ▲11.1 |
| Conservative | 33 | 14 | 0 | 10 | ▼10 | 41.2 | 41.9 | 12,163 | ▼15.9 |
| Independent | 6 | 1 | 1 | 0 | ▲1 | 2.9 | 5.4 | 1,570 | ▲4.4 |
| Green | 5 | 1 | 1 | 0 | ▲1 | 2.9 | 4.7 | 1,370 | ▲2.3 |
| Labour | 11 | 0 | 0 | 0 | Steady | 0.0 | 3.0 | 857 | ▼0.2 |
| UKIP Make Brexit Happen | 4 | 0 | 0 | 0 | Steady | 0.0 | 2.7 | 793 | ▼1.7 |

== Ward results ==
=== Abbey Ward ===
Cirencester Abbey Ward
| Party | Candidate | Votes | % | ±% |
|---|---|---|---|---|
| Liberal Democrats | Mark Harris* | 573 | 75.2 | +22.0 |
| Conservative | Rebecca Senior | 127 | 16.7 | −20.4 |
| Labour | Alan Mackenzie | 62 | 8.1 | N/A |
| Rejected ballots | | 5 | 0.7 | |
| Majority | | 446 | 58.5 | |
| Turnout | | 767 | 40.4 | |
| Registered electors | | 1,899 | | |
| Liberal Democrats hold | | Swing | | |

=== Blockley Ward ===
Blockley Ward
| Party | Candidate | Votes | % | ±% |
|---|---|---|---|---|
| Conservative | Sue Jepson* | 394 | 56.2 | −5.9 |
| Liberal Democrats | Bella McMillan-Scott | 179 | 25.5 | −12.4 |
| Green | Clare Turner | 128 | 18.3 | N/A |
| Rejected ballots | | 15 | 2.1 | |
| Majority | | 215 | 30.7 | |
| Turnout | | 716 | 34.2 | |
| Registered electors | | 2,096 | | |
| Conservative hold | | Swing | | |

=== Bourton Vale Ward ===
Bourton Vale Ward
| Party | Candidate | Votes | % | ±% |
|---|---|---|---|---|
| Conservative | Richard Keeling* | 494 | 64.4 | −8.1 |
| Liberal Democrats | Malcolm Lilley | 273 | 35.6 | +8.1 |
| Rejected ballots | | 12 | 1.5 | |
| Majority | | 221 | 28.8 | |
| Turnout | | 779 | 35.7 | |
| Registered electors | | 2,182 | | |
| Conservative hold | | Swing | | |

=== Bourton Village Ward ===
Bourton Village Ward
| Party | Candidate | Votes | % | ±% |
|---|---|---|---|---|
| Liberal Democrats | Nick Maunder | 470 | 55.0 | +5.8 |
| Conservative | Len Wilkins* | 385 | 45.0 | −5.8 |
| Rejected ballots | | 8 | 0.9 | |
| Majority | | 85 | 9.9 | |
| Turnout | | 863 | 35.2 | |
| Registered electors | | 2,453 | | |
| Liberal Democrats gain from Conservative | | Swing | | |

=== Campden and Vale Ward ===
Campden and Vale Ward (2 seats)
| Party | Candidate | Votes | % | ±% |
|---|---|---|---|---|
| Conservative | Gina Blomefield | 888 | 49.2 | −5.1 |
| Conservative | Mark Annett* | 829 | 46.0 | −11.7 |
| UKIP Make Brexit Happen | Rob McNeil-Wilson | 623 | 34.5 | +17.3 |
| Liberal Democrats | Marcus Efstratiou | 521 | 28.9 | +7.4 |
| Rejected ballots | | 11 | 0.6 | |
| Majority | | 206 | | |
| Turnout | | 1,815 | 37.7 | |
| Registered electors | | 4,813 | | |
| Conservative hold | | Swing | | |
| Conservative hold | | Swing | | |

=== Chedworth and Churn Valley Ward ===
Chedworth and Churn Valley Ward
| Party | Candidate | Votes | % | ±% |
|---|---|---|---|---|
| Liberal Democrats | Jenny Forde* | 586 | 57.5 | +7.5 |
| Independent | David Broad | 201 | 19.7 | −30.2 |
| Conservative | Stephen Senior | 180 | 17.7 | −32.2 |
| UKIP Make Brexit Happen | Christopher Harlow | 52 | 5.1 | N/A |
| Rejected ballots | | 2 | 0.2 | |
| Majority | | 385 | 37.8 | |
| Turnout | | 1,021 | 51.4 | |
| Registered electors | | 1,986 | | |
| Liberal Democrats hold | | Swing | | |

=== Chesterton Ward ===
Cirencester Chesterton Ward
| Party | Candidate | Votes | % | ±% |
|---|---|---|---|---|
| Liberal Democrats | Roly Hughes* | 538 | 85.5 | +39.6 |
| Conservative | Diana Mackenzie-Charrington | 91 | 14.5 | −17.1 |
| Rejected ballots | | 9 | 1.4 | |
| Majority | | 447 | 71.1 | |
| Turnout | | 638 | 34.1 | |
| Registered electors | | 1,873 | | |
| Liberal Democrats hold | | Swing | | |

=== Coln Valley Ward ===
Coln Valley Ward
| Party | Candidate | Votes | % | ±% |
|---|---|---|---|---|
| Conservative | Ray Theodoulou* | 459 | 58.7 | −10.1 |
| Liberal Democrats | Joanna Walker | 186 | 23.8 | +5.0 |
| Green | Michael Poole | 137 | 17.5 | +5.2 |
| Rejected ballots | | 10 | 1.3 | |
| Majority | | 273 | 34.9 | |
| Turnout | | 792 | 39.7 | |
| Registered electors | | 1,995 | | |
| Conservative hold | | Swing | | |

=== Ermin Ward ===
Ermin Ward
| Party | Candidate | Votes | % | ±% |
|---|---|---|---|---|
| Conservative | Julia Judd | 464 | 57.9 | −0.2 |
| Liberal Democrats | Ed Smith | 338 | 42.1 | +9.3 |
| Rejected ballots | | 13 | 1.6 | |
| Majority | | 126 | 15.7 | |
| Turnout | | 815 | 39.9 | |
| Registered electors | | 2,043 | | |
| Conservative hold | | Swing | | |

=== Fairford North Ward ===
Following the 2017 by-election, this ward was held by the Liberal Democrats.

Fairford North Ward
| Party | Candidate | Votes | % | ±% |
|---|---|---|---|---|
| Liberal Democrats | Andrew Doherty* | 493 | 69.2 | +41.4 |
| Conservative | Rob Stead | 219 | 30.8 | −20.3 |
| Rejected ballots | | 14 | 1.9 | |
| Majority | | 274 | 38.5 | |
| Turnout | | 726 | 36.4 | |
| Registered electors | | 1,996 | | |
| Liberal Democrats hold | | Swing | | |

=== Fosseridge Ward ===
Fosseridge Ward
| Party | Candidate | Votes | % | ±% |
|---|---|---|---|---|
| Conservative | Julian Beale* | 620 | 68.7 | −2.9 |
| Liberal Democrats | Dominique Simpson | 282 | 31.3 | +17.0 |
| Rejected ballots | | 11 | 1.2 | |
| Majority | | 338 | 37.5 | |
| Turnout | | 913 | 42.9 | |
| Registered electors | | 2,125 | | |
| Conservative hold | | Swing | | |

=== Four Acres Ward ===
Cirencester Four Acres Ward
| Party | Candidate | Votes | % | ±% |
|---|---|---|---|---|
| Liberal Democrats | Ray Brassington* | 407 | 69.6 | +17.1 |
| Conservative | Edward Horsfall | 140 | 23.9 | −10.5 |
| Labour | Richard Guilding | 38 | 6.5 | N/A |
| Rejected ballots | | 11 | 1.8 | |
| Majority | | 267 | 45.6 | |
| Turnout | | 596 | 38.3 | |
| Registered electors | | 1,556 | | |
| Liberal Democrats hold | | Swing | | |

=== Grumbolds Ash with Avening Ward ===
Grumbolds Ash with Avening Ward
| Party | Candidate | Votes | % | ±% |
|---|---|---|---|---|
| Conservative | Richard Morgan* | 460 | 61.3 | −10.2 |
| Liberal Democrats | Nicky Baber | 172 | 22.9 | −5.6 |
| Labour | Ed Shelton | 118 | 15.7 | N/A |
| Rejected ballots | | 21 | 2.7 | |
| Majority | | 288 | 38.4 | |
| Turnout | | 771 | 37.2 | |
| Registered electors | | 2,070 | | |
| Conservative hold | | Swing | | |

=== Kemble Ward ===
Kemble Ward
| Party | Candidate | Votes | % | ±% |
|---|---|---|---|---|
| Conservative | Tony Berry* | 538 | 57.9 | −4.3 |
| Green | Sabrina Poole | 262 | 28.2 | N/A |
| Labour | Sian Smith | 68 | 7.3 | N/A |
| UKIP Make Brexit Happen | John Fleming | 61 | 6.6 | −3.6 |
| Rejected ballots | | 6 | 0.6 | |
| Majority | | 276 | 29.7 | |
| Turnout | | 935 | 44.2 | |
| Registered electors | | 2,117 | | |
| Conservative hold | | Swing | | |

=== Lechlade, Kempsford and Fairford South Ward ===
Lechlade, Kempsford and Fairford South Ward (2 seats)
| Party | Candidate | Votes | % | ±% |
|---|---|---|---|---|
| Conservative | Stephen Andrews* | 829 | 52.0 | +2.2 |
| Conservative | Steve Trotter | 826 | 51.8 | −5.2 |
| Liberal Democrats | Kara Wise | 483 | 30.3 | +10.2 |
| Green | Xanthe Messenger | 468 | 29.4 | N/A |
| Labour | Trevor Smith | 235 | 14.7 | +1.3 |
| Rejected ballots | | 21 | 1.3 | |
| Majority | | 343 | | |
| Turnout | | 1,615 | 33.6 | |
| Registered electors | | 4,811 | | |
| Conservative hold | | Swing | | |
| Conservative hold | | Swing | | |

=== Moreton East Ward ===
Moreton East Ward
| Party | Candidate | Votes | % | ±% |
|---|---|---|---|---|
| Liberal Democrats | Rachel Coxcoon | 585 | 62.8 | +48.3 |
| Conservative | David Cunningham | 314 | 33.7 | −33.6 |
| Labour | Simon Cohen | 33 | 3.5 | −14.7 |
| Rejected ballots | | 22 | 2.3 | |
| Majority | | 271 | 29.1 | |
| Turnout | | 954 | 41.8 | |
| Registered electors | | 2,281 | | |
| Liberal Democrats gain from Conservative | | Swing | | |

=== Moreton West Ward ===
Moreton West Ward
| Party | Candidate | Votes | % | ±% |
|---|---|---|---|---|
| Liberal Democrats | Clive Webster | 468 | 55.2 | +32.1 |
| Conservative | Alison Coggins* | 380 | 44.8 | −32.1 |
| Rejected ballots | | 11 | 1.3 | |
| Majority | | 88 | 10.4 | |
| Turnout | | 859 | 44.1 | |
| Registered electors | | 1,949 | | |
| Liberal Democrats gain from Conservative | | Swing | | |

=== New Mills Ward ===
Cirencester New Mills Ward
| Party | Candidate | Votes | % | ±% |
|---|---|---|---|---|
| Liberal Democrats | Claire Bloomer | 353 | 75.9 | +20.3 |
| Conservative | Frederick Hart | 112 | 24.1 | −20.3 |
| Rejected ballots | | 9 | 1.9 | |
| Majority | | 241 | 51.8 | |
| Turnout | | 474 | 25.3 | |
| Registered electors | | 1,870 | | |
| Liberal Democrats hold | | Swing | | |

=== Northleach Ward ===
Northleach Ward
| Party | Candidate | Votes | % | ±% |
|---|---|---|---|---|
| Liberal Democrats | Tony Dale | 557 | 62.2 | +27.1 |
| Conservative | Jolyon Grey | 338 | 37.8 | −19.8 |
| Rejected ballots | | 12 | 1.3 | |
| Majority | | 219 | 24.5 | |
| Turnout | | 907 | 41.2 | |
| Registered electors | | 2,202 | | |
| Liberal Democrats gain from Conservative | | Swing | | |

=== Sandywell Ward ===
Sandywell Ward
| Party | Candidate | Votes | % | ±% |
|---|---|---|---|---|
| Conservative | Robin Hughes* | 536 | 67.0 | −3.6 |
| Liberal Democrats | Harry Chalklin | 199 | 24.9 | −4.5 |
| Labour | Ian Pillinger | 65 | 8.1 | N/A |
| Rejected ballots | | 9 | 1.1 | |
| Majority | | 337 | 42.1 | |
| Turnout | | 809 | 38.5 | |
| Registered electors | | 2,104 | | |
| Conservative hold | | Swing | | |

=== Siddington and Cerney Rural Ward ===
Siddington and Cerney Rural Ward
| Party | Candidate | Votes | % | ±% |
|---|---|---|---|---|
| Liberal Democrats | Mike Evemy | 565 | 71.4 | +22.9 |
| Conservative | Richard Davies | 226 | 28.6 | −22.9 |
| Rejected ballots | | 8 | 1.0 | |
| Majority | | 339 | 42.9 | |
| Turnout | | 799 | 38.1 | |
| Registered electors | | 2,095 | | |
| Liberal Democrats gain from Conservative | | Swing | | |

=== South Cerney Village Ward ===
South Cerney Village
| Party | Candidate | Votes | % | ±% |
|---|---|---|---|---|
| Liberal Democrats | Juliet Layton* | 565 | 83.7 | +35.1 |
| Conservative | Margaret Saunders | 110 | 16.3 | −13.5 |
| Rejected ballots | | 15 | 2.2 | |
| Majority | | 455 | 67.4 | |
| Turnout | | 690 | 33.0 | |
| Registered electors | | 2,089 | | |
| Liberal Democrats hold | | Swing | | |

=== St Michael's Ward ===
Cirencester St Michael's Ward
| Party | Candidate | Votes | % | ±% |
|---|---|---|---|---|
| Liberal Democrats | Joe Harris* | 554 | 73.0 | +22.9 |
| Conservative | Harry Coutts | 147 | 19.4 | −12.4 |
| Labour | Terence Pomroy | 58 | 7.6 | N/A |
| Rejected ballots | | 7 | 0.9 | |
| Majority | | 407 | 53.6 | |
| Turnout | | 766 | 41.1 | |
| Registered electors | | 1,866 | | |
| Liberal Democrats hold | | Swing | | |

=== Stow Ward ===
Stow Ward
| Party | Candidate | Votes | % | ±% |
|---|---|---|---|---|
| Liberal Democrats | Dilys Neill* | 577 | 65.3 | +21.4 |
| Conservative | Tom Bradley | 307 | 34.7 | −21.4 |
| Rejected ballots | | 10 | 1.1 | |
| Majority | | 270 | 30.5 | |
| Turnout | | 894 | 42.7 | |
| Registered electors | | 2,092 | | |
| Liberal Democrats gain from Conservative | | Swing | | |

=== Stratton Ward ===
Cirencester Stratton Ward
| Party | Candidate | Votes | % | ±% |
|---|---|---|---|---|
| Liberal Democrats | Patrick Coleman* | 497 | 57.1 | +5.2 |
| Independent | Phillip Coleman | 223 | 25.6 | N/A |
| Conservative | Malcolm Gilmore | 115 | 13.2 | −24.9 |
| Labour | Gunther Strait | 35 | 4.0 | N/A |
| Rejected ballots | | 17 | 1.9 | |
| Majority | | 274 | 31.5 | |
| Turnout | | 887 | 42.8 | |
| Registered electors | | 2,070 | | |
| Liberal Democrats hold | | Swing | | |

=== Tetbury East and Rural Ward ===
Tetbury East and Rural Ward
| Party | Candidate | Votes | % | ±% |
|---|---|---|---|---|
| Independent | Nikki Ind | 603 | 73.5 | N/A |
| Conservative | Maggie Heaven* | 217 | 26.5 | −47.0 |
| Rejected ballots | | 1 | 0.1 | |
| Majority | | 386 | 47.1 | |
| Turnout | | 821 | | |
| Registered electors | | 1,921 | | |
| Independent gain from Conservative | | Swing | | |

=== Tetbury Town Ward ===
Tetbury Town Ward
| Party | Candidate | Votes | % | ±% |
|---|---|---|---|---|
| Conservative | Stephen Hirst* | 232 | 40.3 | −6.8 |
| Independent | Kevin Painter | 231 | 40.2 | +15.5 |
| Liberal Democrats | Rebecca Halifax | 112 | 19.5 | +11.2 |
| Rejected ballots | | 10 | 1.7 | |
| Majority | | 1 | 0.2 | |
| Turnout | | 585 | 33.6 | |
| Registered electors | | 1,742 | | |
| Conservative hold | | Swing | | |

=== Tetbury with Upton Ward ===
Tetbury with Upton Ward
| Party | Candidate | Votes | % | ±% |
|---|---|---|---|---|
| Conservative | Richard Norris | 334 | 48.0 | −13.5 |
| Independent | Georgina Osman | 223 | 32.0 | N/A |
| Labour | Jon Easterbrook | 76 | 10.9 | −9.0 |
| Liberal Democrats | Nigel Bass | 63 | 9.1 | −9.5 |
| Rejected ballots | | 9 | 1.3 | |
| Majority | | 111 | 15.9 | |
| Turnout | | 705 | 42.0 | |
| Registered electors | | 1,678 | | |
| Conservative hold | | Swing | | |

=== The Ampneys and Hampton Ward ===
The Ampneys and Hampton Ward
| Party | Candidate | Votes | % | ±% |
|---|---|---|---|---|
| Liberal Democrats | Lisa Spivey | 727 | 58.5 | +21.5 |
| Conservative | David Fowles* | 516 | 41.5 | −21.5 |
| Rejected ballots | | 9 | 0.7 | |
| Majority | | 211 | 17.0 | |
| Turnout | | 1,252 | 57.0 | |
| Registered electors | | 2,196 | | |
| Liberal Democrats gain from Conservative | | Swing | | |

=== The Beeches Ward ===
Cirencester Beeches
| Party | Candidate | Votes | % | ±% |
|---|---|---|---|---|
| Liberal Democrats | Nigel Robbins* | 526 | 79.6 | +40.1 |
| Conservative | Robin McCorkell | 135 | 20.4 | −15.1 |
| Rejected ballots | | 11 | 1.6 | |
| Majority | | 391 | 59.2 | |
| Turnout | | 672 | 30.1 | |
| Registered electors | | 2,229 | | |
| Liberal Democrats hold | | Swing | | |

=== The Rissingtons Ward ===
The Rissingtons Ward
| Party | Candidate | Votes | % | ±% |
|---|---|---|---|---|
| Green | Andrew Maclean | 375 | 52.6 | +31.9 |
| Conservative | Mark Mackenzie-Charrington* | 338 | 47.4 | −19.0 |
| Rejected ballots | | 14 | 1.9 | |
| Majority | | 37 | 5.2 | |
| Turnout | | 727 | 36.8 | |
| Registered electors | | 1,978 | | |
| Green gain from Conservative | | Swing | | |

=== Watermoor Ward ===
Cirencester Watermoor
| Party | Candidate | Votes | % | ±% |
|---|---|---|---|---|
| Liberal Democrats | Gary Selwyn | 406 | 57.8 | +9.1 |
| Independent | Jenny Hincks* | 89 | 12.7 | −36.0 |
| Conservative | Christopher Daniels | 82 | 11.7 | −21.3 |
| Labour | Will Downes-Hall | 69 | 9.8 | N/A |
| UKIP Make Brexit Happen | Pete Elliott | 57 | 8.1 | −10.1 |
| Rejected ballots | | 3 | 0.4 | |
| Majority | | 317 | 45.1 | |
| Turnout | | 706 | 33.9 | |
| Registered electors | | 2,081 | | |
| Liberal Democrats hold | | Swing | | |

== Changes 2019–2023 ==
=== By-elections ===
==== Fosseridge ====
Fosseridge, 6 May 2021
| Party | Candidate | Votes | % | ±% |
|---|---|---|---|---|
| Conservative | David Cunningham | 641 | 63.7 | −5.0 |
| Liberal Democrats | Dominique Simpson | 251 | 25.0 | −6.3 |
| Green | Clare Turner | 114 | 11.3 | N/A |
| Rejected ballots | | 3 | 0.3 | |
| Majority | | 390 | 38.8 | |
| Turnout | | 1,009 | 47.0 | |
| Registered electors | | 2,145 | | |
| Conservative hold | | Swing | | |

In March 2021, Conservative councillor Julian Beale resigned from the council due to ill health, creating the vacancy in Fosseridge.

==== Campden and Vale ====
Campden and Vale, 3 February 2022
| Party | Candidate | Votes | % | ±% |
|---|---|---|---|---|
| Conservative | Tom Stowe | 1,180 | 56.2 | +10.2 |
| Liberal Democrats | Danny Loveridge | 920 | 43.8 | +14.9 |
| Rejected ballots | | 20 | 0.9 | |
| Majority | | 260 | 12.4 | |
| Turnout | | 2,100 | 42.4 | |
| Registered electors | | 5,005 | | |
| Conservative hold | | Swing | | |

Conservative councillor Mark Annett was disqualified from serving after failing to attend a council meeting for six months, creating the vacancy in Campden and Vale.
