= Murder of Phoenix Netts =

2020 murder case in England

- Date: 16 April 2020
- Location: Forest of Dean, Gloucestershire, England–Wales border
- Cause: Stabbing
- Deaths: 1

Phoenix Netts was a murder victim whose body was found hidden in two suitcases in the Forest of Dean, Gloucestershire, near the England–Wales border in May 2020.

== Investigation ==
=== Discovery ===
The investigation began after a member of the public reported their suspicions to police about a car being driven erratically on the A4136 road near Coleford in the Forest of Dean. Police located the car a short while later and they spoke to two people. Two suitcases containing human remains were found, two people arrested, and a vehicle seized. The remains were found on 12 May 2020, around 11:30pm.

=== Search ===
A search began of Stowfield quarry and the village of Staunton. There was a large police presence in the area, a police helicopter and several roads were closed.

The A4136 was closed between Monmouth and Coleford and closures were expected to remain until Friday 15 May 2020.

On 15 May 2020, police searched properties in Wolverhampton and Birmingham as well as using DNA tests to identify the victim.

=== Police statements ===
Detective chief inspector John Turner, the senior investigating officer, said "The nature of this incident is distressing and we’re working around the clock to fully understand what has happened. Someone’s life has been lost and our priority is to identify the victim and get answers for her family. Searches have taken place in the surrounding area for evidence-gathering and no remains have been found as part of these searches. Our major crime investigation team is working in collaboration with the West Midlands police homicide team to carry out further enquiries."

On 14 May 2020, a Gloucestershire police spokesman said "Officers have been granted a 36-hour magistrates’ extension to continue questioning two people who were arrested on suspicion of murder. Overnight a 12-hour custody extension had been granted for both the woman aged in her 20s and from Birmingham and the man aged in his 30s and from Wolverhampton. The further 36-hour extension was granted at around midday today and means they can remain in custody for further questioning. Due to the ongoing investigation, road closures and scene guards are likely to remain in place. Gloucestershire constabulary would like to thank local residents and those impacted by the cordons for their patience during this time."

On 15 May 2020, Gloucestershire police said "A postmortem examination yesterday was found to be inconclusive and further examinations are ongoing to establish the cause of death. DNA testing is also ongoing to identify the female victim. Searches have continued today around the area of Stowfield Quarry, near Coleford, and some road closures remain in place in the surrounding area.

=== Impact ===
Key workers had to find detours around the closed roads and some thought that the roadblocks were to stop people travelling from England to Wales to exercise. As a result of the COVID-19 pandemic in Wales people were only allowed to exercise in their own area.

== Charges ==
A 27-year-old woman from Birmingham appeared before Cheltenham Magistrates' court on 19 May 2020 and was charged with killing the woman between 14 April and 12 May 2020 at her home in Birmingham. She was remanded to appear in Gloucester Crown Court on 19 May 2020. A 38 year old man from Wolverhampton was charged with assisting an offender between 25 April and 12 May 2020 and was also remanded to appear before Gloucester Crown Court on 19 May 2020. Both were refused bail when they appeared before magistrates in Cheltenham via video-link.

== Identification ==
The remains were identified via DNA tests as those of Phoenix Netts, a 28-year-old woman from Birmingham.

== Change of police force and charges ==
Detectives from West Midlands police have taken over the investigation from Gloucestershire police. Their investigations have focused on a women's refuge in Birmingham.

Conditional bail was granted to the man from Wolverhampton. The conditions include him residing at his home address, following a curfew between 7pm and 7am, reporting daily to police and surrendering his travel documents. No application for bail was made for the woman from Birmingham.

A provisional trial date of 10 November was set.

As of 10 November 2020, all charges against the man were dropped.

== Guilty plea and sentencing ==
In 21 April 2021, Gareeca Gordon pleaded guilty to murdering Phoenix Netts between 14 April 2020 and 12 May 2020. She had been due to stand trial the following week, but appeared via video link from HM Prison Eastwood Park before Bristol Crown Court to confirm her identity and plead guilty. The Crown Prosecution Service said that Gordon had murdered Netts on 16 April 2020.

On 4 May 2021, Gordon was sentenced to life with a minimum term of 23 years and 6 months.

== See also ==
- List of solved missing person cases (2020s)
