= A4136 road =

Road in Great Britain

A4136

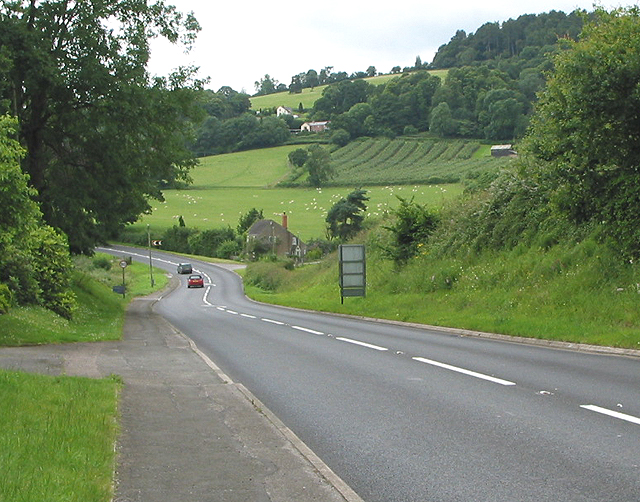
- A4136 at Huntley

Route information
- Length: 16.5 mi (26.6 km)

Major junctions
- West end: Wyesham, Monmouth; 51.8106°N 2.7071°W
- A466 A4151; A40
- East end: Huntley, Gloucestershire; 51.8723°N 2.4127°W

Location
- Country: United Kingdom

Road network
- Roads in the United Kingdom; Motorways; A and B road zones
← A4135	→ A4137

The A4136 road is the main road through the Forest of Dean in Gloucestershire, England and Monmouthshire, Wales. At its western end it connects to the A466 road at Wyesham, which is a short distance from Wye Bridge and the A40 road at Monmouth. Its eastern end at Huntley, Gloucestershire also connects to the A40. It is 16.5 miles (26.6 km) long, a shortcut of approximately 3.8 miles (6.1 km) relative to the A40.

== Places served ==
West to East

- Wyesham
- The Kymin
- Staunton
- Berry Hill
- Five Acres
- Edge End
- Worrall Hill
- Brierley
- Nailbridge
- Plump Hill
- Mitcheldean
- Longhope
- Little London
- Huntley
