= East Dean =

East Dean may refer to the following places in England:

- East Dean, East Sussex
- East Dean, Gloucestershire
- East Dean, Hampshire
- East Dean, West Sussex
