= West Dean Rural District =

Former local government area in the UK

Coordinates: 51.782°N 2.577°W

- Area
  - 1911: 21,469 acres (86.88 km^{2})
  - 1931: 21,470 acres (86.9 km^{2})
  - 1961: 24,155 acres (97.75 km^{2})
- Population
  - 1911: 13,454
  - 1931: 14,260
  - 1961: 17,576
- History
  - Created: 1894
  - Abolished: 1974
  - Succeeded by: Forest of Dean
- Status: Rural district
- Government: West Dean Rural District Council

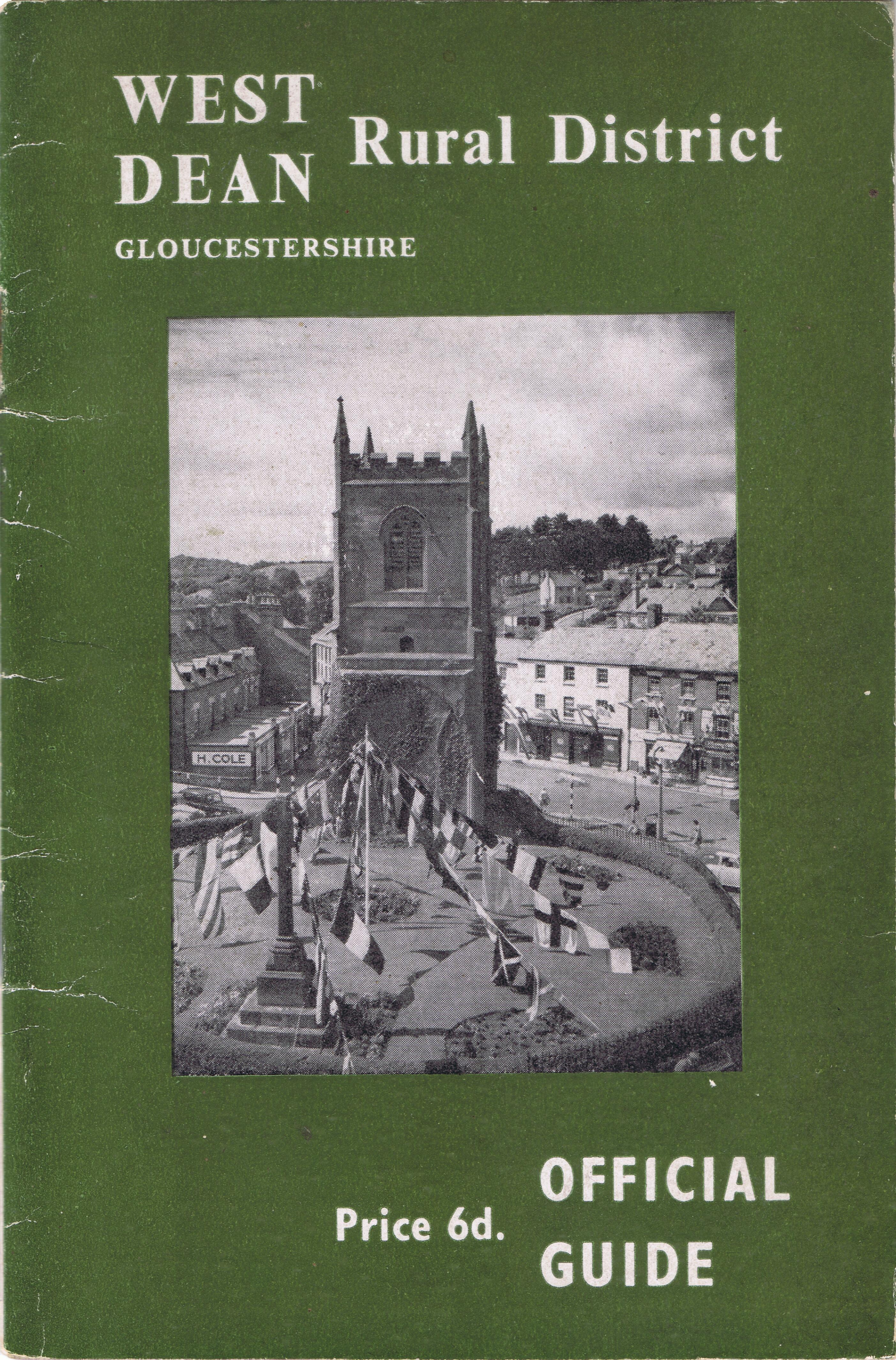
West Dean Rural District, Official Guide, 1960

West Dean Rural District was a rural district in Gloucestershire, England, from 1894 to 1974. It comprised a number of civil parishes, including, confusingly, one called West Dean, and gained further territory in 1935.

It was formed from the part of the Monmouth rural sanitary district that was in Gloucestershire (the rest, in Monmouthshire, becoming part of Monmouth Rural District).

It consisted of the following civil parishes, listed with their population in 1961:

- English Bicknor: 457
- Coleford (1935–1974): 3,546
- Lydbrook (1935–1974): 2,465
- Newland: 963
- Staunton: 206
- West Dean: 9,939

Coleford parish, gained in 1935, was previously an urban district. The parish of Lydbrook was a new creation; it had previously formed part of the East Dean civil parish and was transferred from the East Dean and United Parishes Rural District.

The district was abolished in 1974 when its former area became part of the Forest of Dean district, under the Local Government Act 1972.
