= West Dean =

West Dean may refer to several places in England:

- West Dean, Gloucestershire
- West Dean, West Sussex
  - West Dean College, West Sussex
- West Dean, Wiltshire
- Westdean, East Sussex
