= East Dean Rural District =

Historical rural district

East Dean Rural District (East Dean and United Parishes Rural District from 1894 to 1935)
- Area
  - 1911/1931: 28,626 acres (115.85 km^{2})
  - 1961: 30,476 acres (123.33 km^{2})
- Population
  - 1911: 19,952
  - 1931: 19,915
  - 1961: 30,476
- History
  - Created: 1894
  - Abolished: 1974
  - Succeeded by: Forest of Dean
- Status: Rural district
- Government: East Dean Rural District Council
  - Motto: VELUT SILVA FLOREAT (May she flourish as the forest)

East Dean and United Parishes Rural District, later renamed East Dean Rural District, was a rural district in Gloucestershire, England from 1894 to 1974. It included a number of civil parishes, including East Dean, and was subject to a significant boundary reform in 1935.

It included the following civil parishes:

- Abenhall (1894–1935); abolished as a civil parish to become part of Mitcheldean
- Awre (1935–1974); previously an urban district
- Blaisdon
- Bulley (1894–1935); abolished as a civil parish to become part of Churcham
- Churcham
- Cinderford (1953–1974); formed from part of East Dean civil parish
- East Dean (1894–1953)
  - part split off in 1935 to form new parish of Lydbrook and transferred to West Dean Rural District
  - abolished as a civil parish in 1953 to create Cinderford, Drybrook and Ruspidge; parts to Awre, Littledean and Mitcheldean
- Drybrook (1953–1974); formed from part of East Dean civil parish
- Flaxley (1894–1935); abolished as a civil parish to become part of Blaisdon
- Huntley
- Littledean
- Longhope
- Mitcheldean
- Minsterworth (1894–1953); transferred to Gloucester Rural District
- Ruardean
- Ruspidge (1953–1974); formed from part of East Dean civil parish

The district was abolished in 1974 when its former area became part of the Forest of Dean district, under the Local Government Act 1972.
