= West Dean, Gloucestershire =

Civil parish in Gloucestershire, England

Coordinates: 51.7472°N 2.5728°W

West Dean
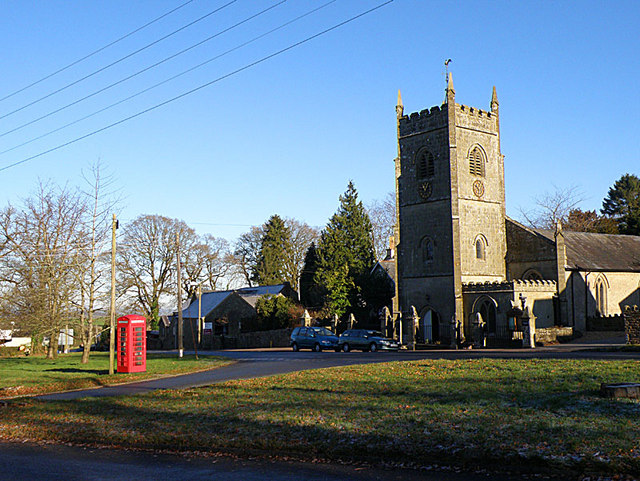
- Church at Christchurch

- Location within Gloucestershire
- Area: 46.86 km^{2} (18.09 sq mi)
- Population: 10,242 (2011)
  - Density: 219/km^{2} (570/sq mi)
- OS grid reference: SO605055
- Civil parish: West Dean
- District: Forest of Dean
- Shire county: Gloucestershire
- Region: South West
- Country: England
- Sovereign state: United Kingdom
- Post town: LYDNEY
- Postcode district: GL15
- Dialling code: 01594
- Police: Gloucestershire
- Fire: Gloucestershire
- Ambulance: South Western
- UK Parliament: Forest of Dean
- Website: www.westdeanpc.org.uk

West Dean is a civil parish, situated in the Forest of Dean district of Gloucestershire, England.

== History ==
The Forest of Dean was an extra-parochial area in the St Briavels Hundred of Gloucestershire. It was without the usual parish structure until the West Dean and East Dean townships were formed in 1844. For poor relief, West Dean was grouped into the Monmouth Poor Law Union and was included in the Monmouth rural sanitary district. Following the Local Government Act 1894, West Dean became a civil parish in the West Dean Rural District. In 1974 the rural district was abolished and West Dean became one of 41 civil parishes in the Forest of Dean district.

== Governance ==
West Dean parish is divided electorally into 5 wards with a total of 15 councillors as follows:

- Ellwood and Sling Ward - 2 councillors
- Christchurch Ward - 1 councillor
- Bream Ward - 5 councillors
- Pillowell Ward - 5 councillors
- Berry Hill Ward - 2 councillors.

The council is consulted by all public service providers and has a statutory right to comment on all planning applications in West Dean. In 2000 it purchased and refurbished Bream Community Centre, which has since been extended and a Parish Office established there. Other areas Council have become involved in are provision of bus shelters, street cleaning, footpaths, play areas, environmental improvements and capital projects such as the restoration of Bream Cenotaph and works at Parkend Churchyard.

The Council meets on the last Wednesday of each month at Beam Community Centre at 7pm. Every Council meeting begins with a Public Open Forum to enable electors to ask questions or comment on matters that affect the Parish.

== Geography ==
West Dean is the largest civil parish in the Forest of Dean district, both in respect of its population and its geographical size.

At the 2001 census there were 10,305 people living in West Dean Parish, more than in any of the Forest towns. The size of the Parish is a considerable 4686 hectares and stretches from Berry Hill and Christchurch in the north to Bream in the south and from Sling in the west to Viney Hill in the east.

=== Villages in the civil parish ===
- Berry Hill, including Christchurch, Five Acres, Joyford, and Shortstanding
- Edge End
- Ellwood
- Sling
- Clements End
- Little Drybrook
- Bream
- Brockhollands
- Yorkley
- Pillowell
- Oldcroft
- Viney Hill
- Parkend
- Whitecroft
