= Berry Hill, Gloucestershire =

Village in Gloucestershire, England, 1.5 miles north of the town of Coleford

Coordinates: 51.8109°N 2.6155°W

Berry Hill
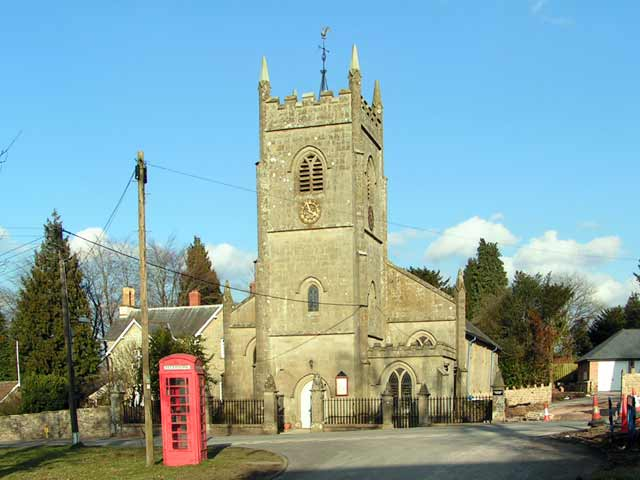
- Christ Church at Berry Hill

- Location within Gloucestershire
- Population: 1,652
- OS grid reference: SO576126
- Civil parish: West Dean
- District: Forest of Dean
- Shire county: Gloucestershire
- Region: South West
- Country: England
- Sovereign state: United Kingdom
- Post town: Coleford
- Postcode district: GL16
- Dialling code: 01594
- Police: Gloucestershire
- Fire: Gloucestershire
- Ambulance: South Western
- UK Parliament: Forest of Dean

Berry Hill is a village in Gloucestershire, England, 1.5 miles north of the town of Coleford. Berry Hill includes the settlements of Five Acres to the east, Christchurch in the centre, Shortstanding to the north, and Joyford to the north-east. Berry Hill is within the civil parish of West Dean.

== History ==
There has been scattered building on Berry Hill since the 16th century. The settlement is situated on the edge of the Forest of Dean, and in 1836 the extraparochial part was called Upper Berry Hill to distinguish it from Lower Berry Hill within Coleford. In the 18th century residents of Berry Hill are recorded as working as stone cutters, and in the 19th century there were working coal mines in the Berry Hill area. After 1840 many new cottages and houses were built at Berry Hill and Five Acres, and in 1874 the area, including nearby Joyford and Shortstanding, had 295 houses.

A number of beerhouses and inns opened in the Berry Hill area in the mid 19th century, which included the King's Head, the Globe, the Rising Sun, and the Dog and Muffler (originally the New Inn). In 1919 there was a recreation ground at Five Acres. A second recreation ground created in 1926 became the home of Berry Hill Rugby Football club. In 1939 woodland was cleared to form the Christchurch holiday campsite.

Berry Hill was the location of one of the first day schools in the Forest of Dean when P. M. Procter opened a day school in his new chapel in 1813. The school, under the control of successive ministers of Christ Church, taught 115 children in 1847. There was a separate infants school at Berry Hill in 1870. In 1914 the older children were transferred to a new secondary school at Berry Hill, originally called Five Acres Council school.

== Christ Church parish church ==
Work began on Christ Church in 1812 when Proctor built his school-chapel. The chapel became a north aisle in 1815 when a new nave was added to double its size and a west gallery was erected. The church was consecrated in 1816. A west tower was added a few years after 1819 and a chancel with octagonal apse and north organ chamber in 1884 and 1885. The church was restored in 1913, when a south-west vestry was added.

== Governance ==
An electoral ward in the same name exists. The total population of this ward taken at the 2011 census was 1,652.

== Famous residents ==
Berry Hill was the birthplace of the television playwright Dennis Potter who married at Christ Church and spent most of his life in the area.
