= Huntley, Gloucestershire =

Village in Gloucestershire, England

Coordinates: 51.86356°N 2.39262°W

Huntley
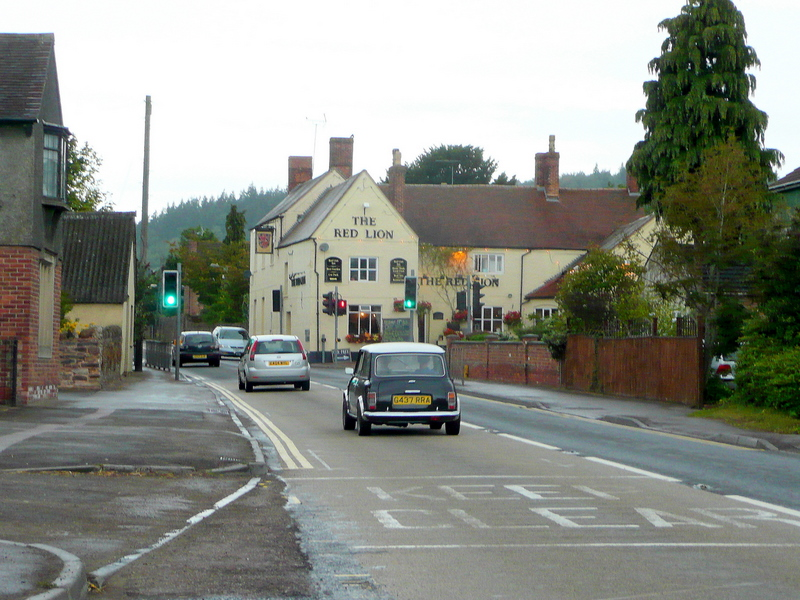

- Location within Gloucestershire
- Population: 1,012
- OS grid reference: SO7219
- District: Forest of Dean
- Shire county: Gloucestershire
- Region: South West
- Country: England
- Sovereign state: United Kingdom
- Post town: GLOUCESTER
- Postcode district: GL19
- Dialling code: 01452
- Police: Gloucestershire
- Fire: Gloucestershire
- Ambulance: South Western
- UK Parliament: Forest of Dean

Huntley, Gloucestershire, is a village on the A40 located seven miles (11 km) west of Gloucester. It is in the north of the Forest of Dean.

== History ==
Huntley (meaning Huntsman's clearing) is mentioned in the Domesday Book as Huntelei.

The village was the scene of fighting during the English Civil War. In 1643 the Royalists took the parliamentary garrison, but they were betrayed and in 1644 the parliamentarians regained control.

The roads to Mitcheldean (now the A4136) and Ross-on-Wye were turnpiked in 1726 and the Toll house, which was built c1830 stood at their junction. This Toll house, that operated where the Longhope Road joins the Ross Road, was of sufficient importance to be replaced by a new one in 1881 and the house still stands.

William Cobbett wrote that, during one of his Rural Rides through England in September 1826, he wanted to spend the night in Gloucester, but arrived there at the time of the Three Choirs Festival. As rooms were so expensive, he had to continue to the coaching inn at Huntley.

The common, part of which is now the recreation ground and allotments, was enclosed in 1857 and in 1872 most of the remaining common land on Huntley Hill was also enclosed.

The village stocks were originally situated on the main road. They were re-sited on the recreation ground in the early 1970s. They are believed to be the only remaining set in the Forest of Dean.

The village was the home of the Forest of Dean chronicler Winifred Foley and her husband Sydney until the mid-1970s.

Two miles north-west lie the earthwork remains of Taynton Castle, a ring motte of C11-C12 date.

== Football ==
Huntley Football Club competes in North Gloucestershire Premier Division. The Club plays its home games at Huntley Recreation Ground.

== Church ==
The church, dedicated to St John the Baptist, dates from the 11th Century. In the 19th Century a new church was effectively built on to the Norman tower. It was designed by Samuel Sanders Teulon and it has been described by a President of the Royal Institute of British Architects as "one of the most interesting buildings in England". The reredos displays in detail the story of the Last Supper. The stonework is finished in local red sandstone and honey coloured Cotswold stone. It has ornate and elaborate decoration of the interior, with paintings of Biblical texts.

== School ==
The local primary school is Huntley Church of England Primary School and is situated next to the church.

== Economy ==
Over time, the focus of the village has moved from the Church and School, on the slopes of Brights Hill, down towards the Toll House and the pub. Between 1951 and 1980 a large number of new houses and roads were built around the centre.

Many residents commute to Gloucester to work, but some do work locally. Fruit production has declined in recent years, but much land is still devoted to agriculture, horticulture and woodland. There has been a growth in the leisure and recreation sector, such as a golf course, a garden centre and a School of Equitation. The golf course and school of equitation had both permanently closed by 2016. The village had its own Post Office until 2010 when it closed. The nearest Post Office is located in Longhope. There is also a pub, "The Red Lion", a traditional butcher's shop and other businesses.

A range of community groups use the Village hall, including the football club, which plays in the Northern Senior League of Gloucestershire County League of the FA. The cricket club, founded in 1874, has its own ground to the south of the main road and used to run a Beer Festival in the summer.

== Huntley Quarry ==
Huntley Quarry (to the west of the village at grid reference SO 7095 1955) exposes a volcaniclastic suite of rocks not known anywhere else. Their age is enigmatic; past suggestions have included either Precambrian, Ordovician or Early Silurian. In addition to their problematic age and the perplexing rock type, the strata has been considerably deformed by faulting and tectonic movement.

Gloucestershire Geology Trust is currently in the process of buying nearly two acres of land, which includes Huntley Quarry. The quarry and its environs will become the first geology reserve in the county, and the first to be owned by a geology trust. See also Geology of Gloucestershire.
