= East Dean, Gloucestershire =

Township and civil parish

Coordinates: 51°47′N 2°33′W

East Dean
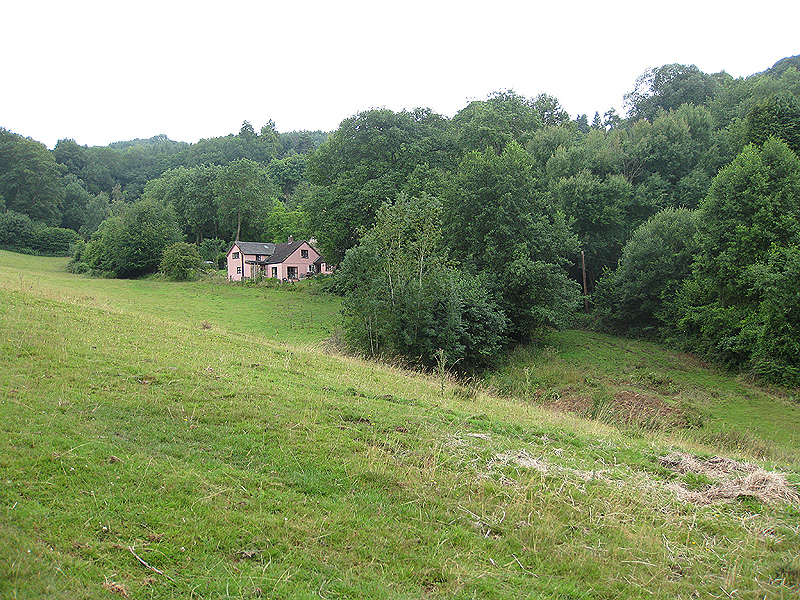

- Location within Gloucestershire
- Civil parish: Mitcheldean
- District: Forest of Dean
- Shire county: Gloucestershire
- Region: South West
- Country: England
- Sovereign state: United Kingdom

East Dean was a township (nominally so) and former civil parish, in the Forest of Dean district, in the county of Gloucestershire, England.

East Dean became a township in 1844 and abolished as a civil parish on 1 April 1953.

The Forest of Dean was an extra-parochial area in the St Briavels hundred of Gloucestershire. It was without the usual parish structure until the West Dean and East Dean townships were formed in 1844. For poor relief, East Dean was grouped into the Westbury-on-Severn Poor Law Union and was included in the Westbury-on-Severn rural sanitary district. Following the Local Government Act 1894, East Dean became a civil parish in the East Dean and United Parishes Rural District, which was renamed East Dean Rural District in 1935.

The population of the parish was as follows:

Year	1881	1891	1901	1911	1921	1931	1941	1951
Population	12,629	14,622	14,588	14,594	15,010	14,678	WW2 (Note: The census was suspended for World War II)	14,152

It occupied an area of 12,487 acres (50.53 km^{2}) in 1881 and 12,860 acres (52.0 km^{2}) in 1951.

In 1935 a new civil parish of Lydbrook was created from part of its area and transferred to West Dean Rural District.

The civil parish was abolished in 1953 and split to create the new parishes of Cinderford, Drybrook and Ruspidge. Part of the former area was also transferred to the existing parishes of Awre, Littledean and Mitcheldean. The area of the former parish is now within the Forest of Dean district.
