= Staunton (near Coleford) =

Village in Gloucestershire, England

Coordinates: 51.8104°N 2.6523°W

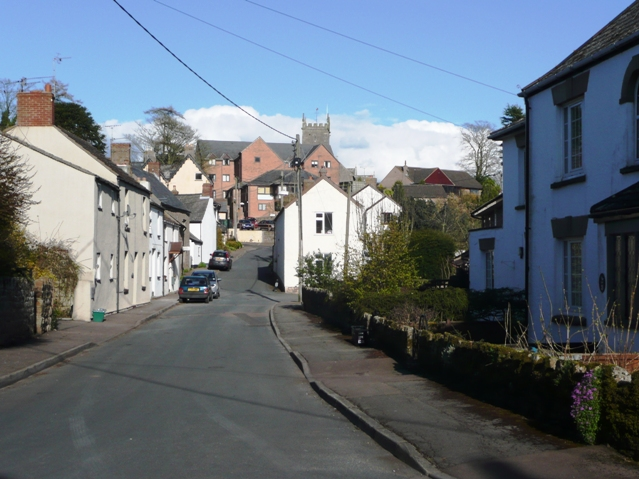

- Location within Gloucestershire
- OS grid reference: SO551126
- Civil parish: Staunton Coleford
- District: Forest of Dean
- Shire county: Gloucestershire
- Region: South West
- Country: England
- Sovereign state: United Kingdom
- Post town: COLEFORD
- Postcode district: GL16
- Police: Gloucestershire
- Fire: Gloucestershire
- Ambulance: South Western
- UK Parliament: Forest of Dean

Staunton is a village and civil parish in the Forest of Dean in west Gloucestershire, England, close to the border with Wales.

== Location ==
Staunton is 2.5 miles east of Monmouth and 2.5 miles north west of Coleford in the Forest of Dean, on the border of England and Wales. The main road which passes through Staunton is the A4136 road.

== History ==
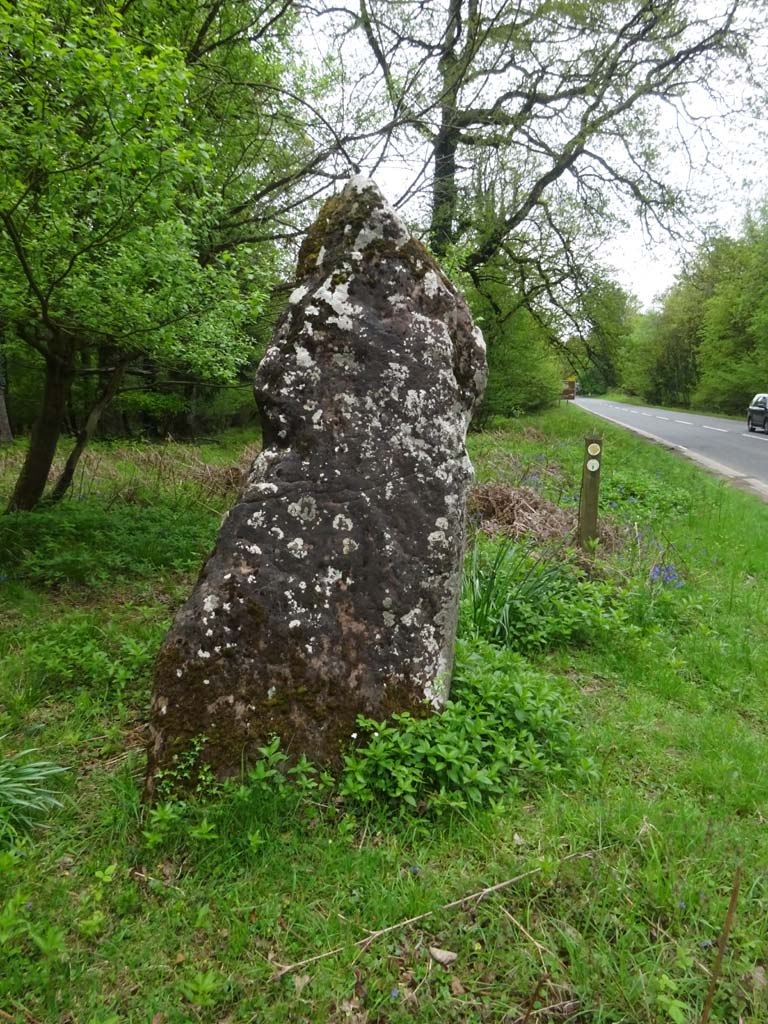
The Long Stone

The name Staunton comes from the Old English words Stane (as in Stane Street) and Tun meaning "stony farmstead or settlement". Stane may also refer to six notable stones within the parish, including a rocky outcrop called the Frog or Toad's Mouth at the west end of the village. The Long Stone, a pillar of rock or possible standing stone (which may date from before 1700 BC), is visible on the Coleford road. The Broad Stone is the largest of several rocks in the fields of Broadstone Farm. The Buckstone is nearby, as are the Suck Stone and the Near Hearkening Rock.

There is little documented history of the parish of Staunton before 1100. Plenty of evidence of Neolithic man has been unearthed over the years in the form of flint cores from weapons and flint tool chipping. It is known that the Romans moved iron ore from local mines down to Blestium (Monmouth), probably on the ancient route lying below and to the east of the present A4136 road between Staunton and Monmouth. After the Romans left, Staunton remained as one or two farmsteads.

Edward the Confessor was the first English King to designate the area between the River Severn and the River Wye as the "King's Forest", a Royal Forest.

Staunton is mentioned in the Domesday Book as one farmstead and a waste or meend. It is probable that the first Norman Lord of the manor arrived in about 1100, and a fortified manor house was built above Castle Ditch. The parish church was also initially built at this time.

The Grade I listed All Saints church has 6 bells, which over the years has been of some interest to campanologists. There have been many bellringing clubs in the past, training new bellringers to ring for local weddings and funerals. The church originally had a paved path leading out of the porchway direct in a straight route to the main road. During the 1980s, this was altered. The original entrance to the graveyard was replaced with a right-angled route instead.

Opposite the village hall is a pound where lost sheep would be kept. When farmers collected their sheep, they would have to pay for their release. This is now a frequent place for the Summer fete to be held.

In 1608 there were 50 houses in the village of Staunton. A muster roll for the parish includes one labourer, two miners, three farmers, one lime burner, one husbandryman, two blacksmiths, one carpenter and a tiler, with others making a total of 35 – this is for fighting men (when called) with weapons in the parish. This would mean that there were about 150 residents altogether.

Deposits of iron ore in the parish were being dug in 1608 and various small mines provided work during the 18th century. In 1871 Robinhood's Mine, in the Marian's Enclosure, was opened and was worked mainly for red oxide. It produced iron ore for several years before it closed in 1932. The Ministry of Supply gave it a short lease of life when they opened it up during the Second World War.

In 1664 there was a limekiln on waste land near the church, and in 1792 one at a quarry at Tillys, which grew to three in the 19th century. From the 1950s the quarry on the ridge of the plantations north of Highmeadow above Cherry Orchard Farm was worked for road stone. By 1994, it was operated and enlarged by Tarmac Ltd, and a new access road was made through the woods to the Coleford–Monmouth road.

In 1799 the village had one inn, The Ostrich, which became the Royal Oak in 1832. In 1813 competition arrived as the White Horse opened in the west part of the village street, which later became the main road. It publicised itself as the last Inn in England. The White Horse, which was rebuilt in the latter part of the 19th century, is now the only public house as the Ostrich closed in the 1890s.

Until the 1970s there was a nursery below the White Horse with large greenhouses on the area stretching from the pub car park to the High House – the site is now built on.

At the beginning of the 19th century a parish day-school was held in Staunton church for around 20 children. In 1828 a small single-room school was built near the east end of the main village street. This school was closed in 1911 and the building used as a reading room. Subsequently, it has been used as the Village Hall.

The old post office – no longer standing – was on the main road on the corner of what is now Well Meadow. It relocated to the opposite side of the road and was combined with a village shop where today there is an architectural antique shop. The post office was relocated again next to High House but closed in the early 1990s. Staunton used to have a petrol filling station where there is now a vehicle repair business.

In the 1960s the Elms Nursing Home was a working dairy farm. It became the nursing home in the 1980s.

Opposite the church is a large collection of buildings which were the granary and mill. This building had a windmill in the small field outside, although this has now gone. Next to this, an almshouse was built. This was used for any person 'in need' from the village to live in. This may have been due to illness, advanced age or financial need.

The Whippington Brook Road is the old road to Christchurch and in this area there has been infill housing amongst the now mostly privately owned former council houses, from Whippington's Corner leading onto Forest Close cul-de-sac. The Old Rectory and its outbuildings, which date from the 17th century, were split up into separate freeholds in the late 1980s, and the Coach House and Tithe Barn converted into residential properties.

The village has won the Bledisloe Cup for 'Best Kept Village' twice, a highly acclaimed judged competition.

== Surroundings and amenities ==
Staunton is known for being surrounded by stones such as the Buckstone, the Suckstone and the Near Hearkening Rock. The best-known stone and a local landmark is the Buckstone. When Lord Nelson and Lady Hamilton visited Monmouth and district, it was painted white in their honour. Up to the middle of the 19th century it used to rock on its base – however, in June 1885 a party of five travelling actors from the London Star Company and the landlord at the Agincourt Inn in Monmouth, having enjoyed an evening of sampling fine wines, managed to dislodge the stone and send it crashing down the slope. It split into several pieces, but was hauled back up the hill at great cost and to prevent further vandalism was cemented in place and no longer rocks.

The Suckstone is reputed to be the largest piece of detached conglomerate or puddingstone rock in England and Wales and has been estimated to weigh maybe 14,000 tons. It is possible to climb this huge stone at the bottom right-hand corner. According to local myth, those that climb the Suckstone are visited by the mischievous and capricious Fairy of the Rock, who will grant certain visitors superhuman powers. Notable people who have encountered this woodland spirit are said to include Victorian artist J. M. W. Turner, during a boyhood visit to the area, and Coleford-born playwright Dennis Potter.

The Near Hearkening Rock is a large exposed and weathered cliff face of Old Red Sandstone and quartz conglomerate and reputedly was given its name by local gamekeepers who used it to detect poachers in their woods at night, both as an observation platform and as a listening post; it is reputedly possible to detect even a whisper or the slightest movement such are the acoustics in this area while standing with your back to the concave cliff face or on the top of the cliff.

It is the first village in the Forest of Dean when approached from Monmouthshire, sited high above Monmouth and the River Wye. The English-Welsh border and Offa's Dyke Path pass close to the village. The Wysis Way runs through the back of Staunton and goes from Monmouth to Gloucester. It links up with Offa's Dyke path and the Thames Path.

In the churchyard is the grave of David Mushet (1772–1847), a noted Scottish metallurgist, who built Darkhill Ironworks and who, with his son, greatly advanced the iron and steel industries.

Stowfield quarry lies approximately 2 km south of the village.

== Village activities ==
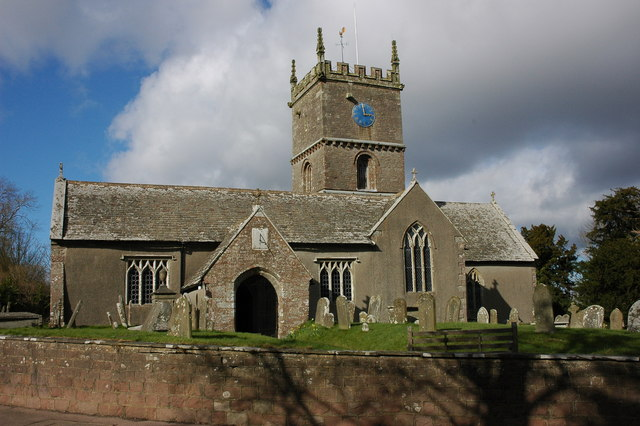
All Saints Church

The village pub, the White Horse Inn, closed in March 2009, but reopened under new ownership on 3 July 2010. The village and parish church is dedicated to All Saints.

A local bed & breakfast is called Steep Meadow. The old octagonal village pound is just past the village hall where there is some seating and views.

There was a thriving horticultural show held each year; this was followed by the Staunton Country Fayre which ran very successfully for many years, the last one being in 2005.

The village hall today is the meeting place for the village art group, book group, harvest suppers, sewing classes, the Garden Club, table-tennis club, keep fit, pantos, musical evenings, Forest of Dean Quaker Sunday worship and parish council meetings. It holds many events throughout the year.
