= Edge End =

Hamlet in Gloucestershire, England

Coordinates: 51.8157°N 2.5905°W

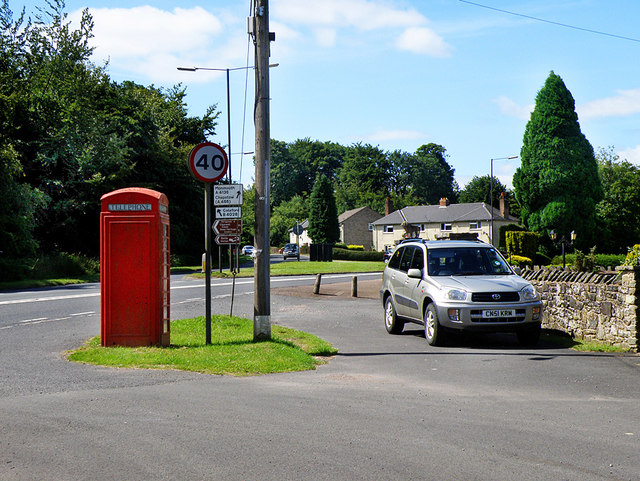

- Location within Gloucestershire
- OS grid reference: SO593131
- Civil parish: West Dean
- District: Forest of Dean
- Shire county: Gloucestershire
- Region: South West
- Country: England
- Sovereign state: United Kingdom
- Police: Gloucestershire
- Fire: Gloucestershire
- Ambulance: South Western
- UK Parliament: Forest of Dean

Edge End is a small hamlet in west Gloucestershire, England.

== Location and amenities ==
Edge End is about 1.5 miles NW of Coleford and about 1 mile north of the Royal Forest of Dean College. Originally close to some mine workings, all of which have now closed, the hamlet consists of 62 private dwellings, with no pubs, shops or schools (the one village shop closed some time ago and is now a bed and breakfast establishment).

The village is effectively split in half by the recreation ground, which is co-owned by the residents and is maintained by contributions. On the rec there are football goals and a children's obstacle course. The rec also hosts an annual bonfire night with fireworks as well as events through the summer. On the 8th May 2023 it will host a party to celebrate the coronation of Charles III.

Within the village live a mix of "Foresters", the original inhabitants, many of whom can trace their family lineage back through the village's history, and incomers from further afield which has increased in recent years. The community has a nice balance and there is a sense of community spirit evident here, with neighbours helping each other. Edge End compared to other areas of the Forest of Dean is more affluent which is reflected in its house prices.

From the rec, perched 600 ft above sea level, on a fine day you can see north for up to 50 miles or so into Shropshire, whilst the counties of Gloucestershire, Herefordshire, Monmouthshire, Worcestershire and the Brecon Beacons are also visible. The hillside drops away to some farming communities, whilst the eastern edge of the hamlet is bounded by the main Monmouth to Gloucester road and the start of the Forest of Dean proper. Edge End represents an excellent starting point for many local walks.

== History ==
A small book is available (from the local bookshop in Coleford) which documents the histories of the families that have lived in Edge End since the 19th century. It was printed in 1993, based mainly on the recollections of the then elderly inhabitants of the village, most of whom have now died.
