= Wye Bridge, Monmouth =

Wye Bridge Pont ar Wy
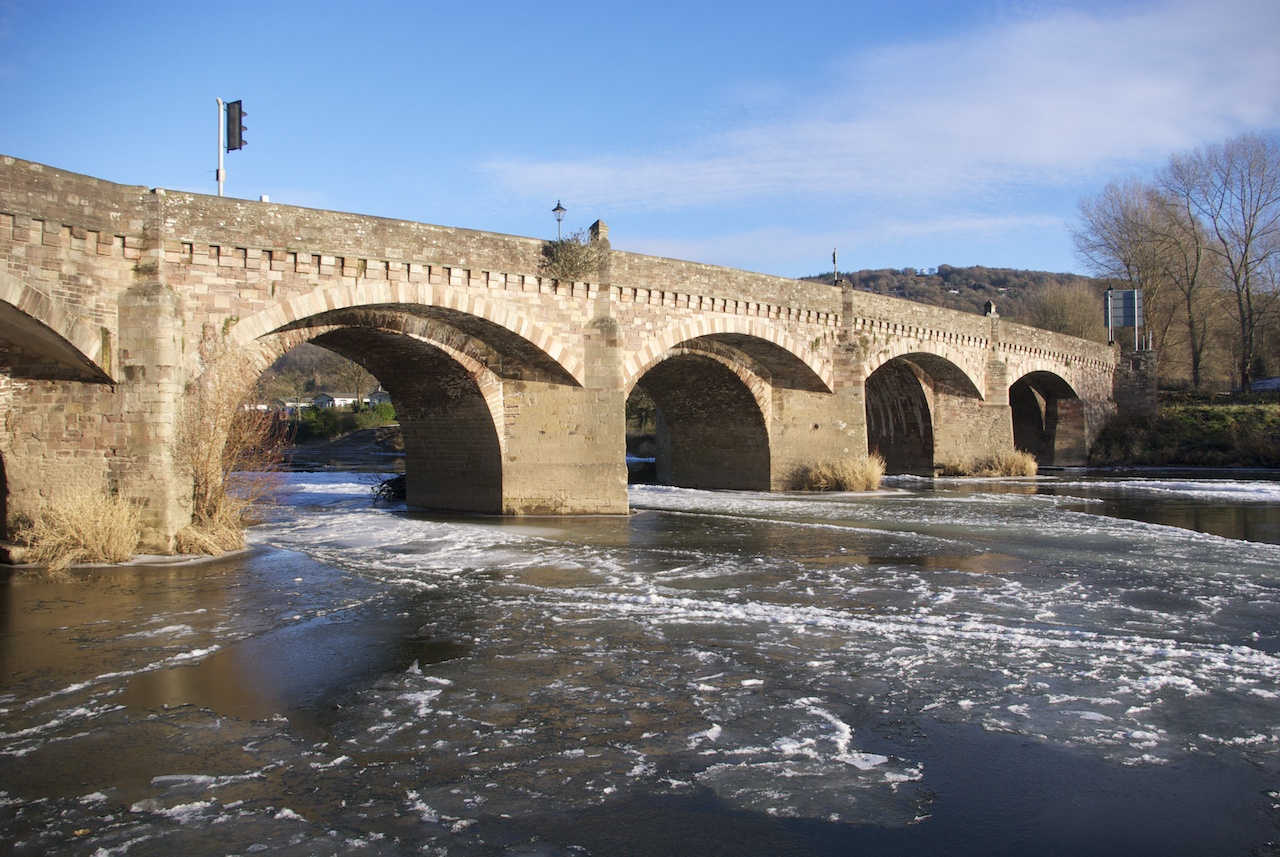
- Coordinates: 51.811373°N 2.709876°W
- Carries: A466
- Crosses: River Wye
- Locale: Monmouth, Wales

Characteristics
- Material: Red and buff sandstone ashlar
- Total length: 71 metres (233 ft)
- No. of spans: 5

History
- Construction end: 1615–17; 1878-80
- Replaces: Earlier, wooden bridge

The Wye Bridge in Monmouth is a bridge across the River Wye. The A466 passes over it and immediately meets the A40 at its western end. The bridge is a grade II listed building. The total span of the bridge is 71 metres (233 ft).

== History ==
The original wooden bridge was built in the Middle Ages; there is a clear reference to it in the fourteenth century. Earlier references to a bridge at Monmouth may refer either to a bridge over the Wye or to the fortified bridge over the Monnow, although local historian Keith Kissack wrote that the bridge was known to exist in 1282 when it formed a boundary with the Forest of Dean. It was completely rebuilt in stone in the early seventeenth century (1615–17). At that time, tolls were collected from all those crossing the bridge.

A plaque on the parapet records the widening of the bridge on both sides in 1878–80 under the architect Edwin Seward of Cardiff, stating, This bridge was widened 1879 from designs by the County Surveyor, David Roberts Contractor.

The bridge is built of red and buff sandstone ashlar. It has five arched spans with the original pointed arches visible beneath, but with both faces covered by segmental arches carried on the sharply pointed cutwaters. The total span is 71 metres (233 ft). The bridge is a Grade II listed structure.

At the southern, Wyesham, end of the bridge, and now largely concealed by road-widening, are two pillboxes dating from World War II. Such pillboxes formed part of the British hardened field defences which were constructed in the early part of the war in anticipation of a German invasion. The Wye Bridge pillboxes formed part of Western Command Stop Line No. 27 which followed the course of the River Wye. The pillboxes are scheduled monuments.

== Routes ==
The bridge is a crossing for the Wye but it is also the start of the Wysis Way, a long footpath that connects Monmouth to Kemble in Gloucestershire and to other national footpaths.

== Gallery ==
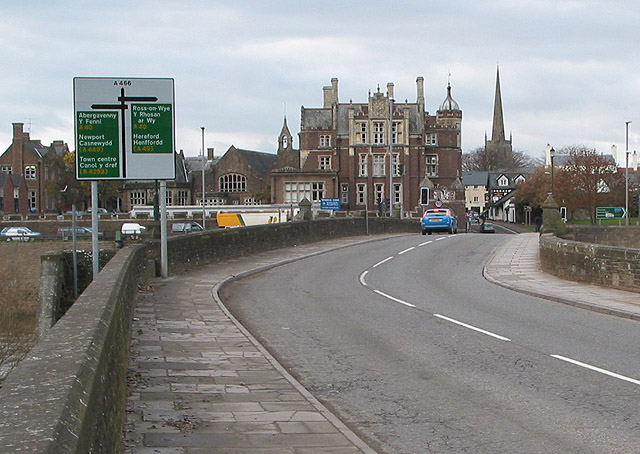
A466 crosses the Wye Bridge, view towards Monmouth School

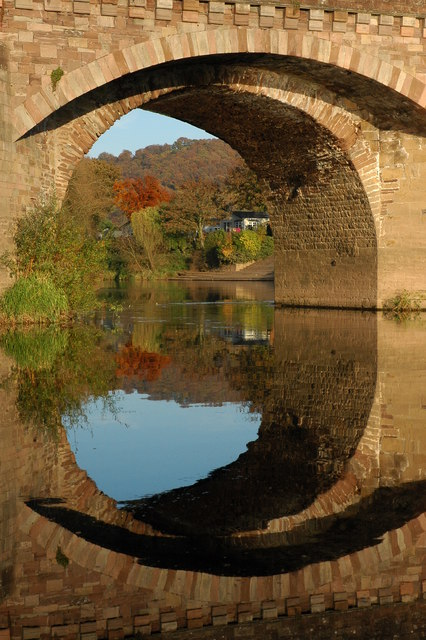
Close up of an arch of the Wye bridge

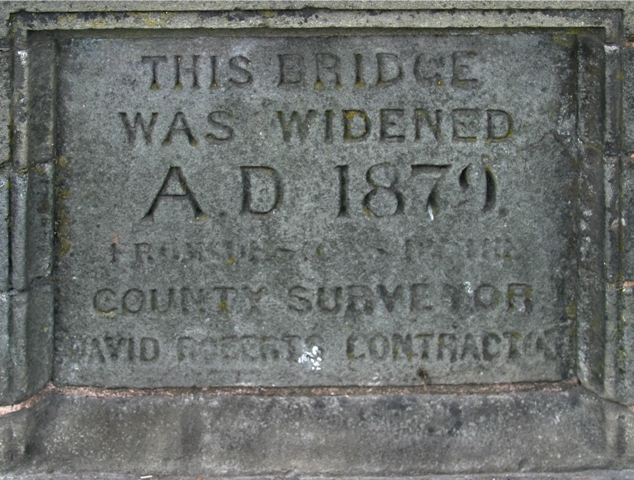
Plaque on the bridge: This bridge was widened in A.D 1879

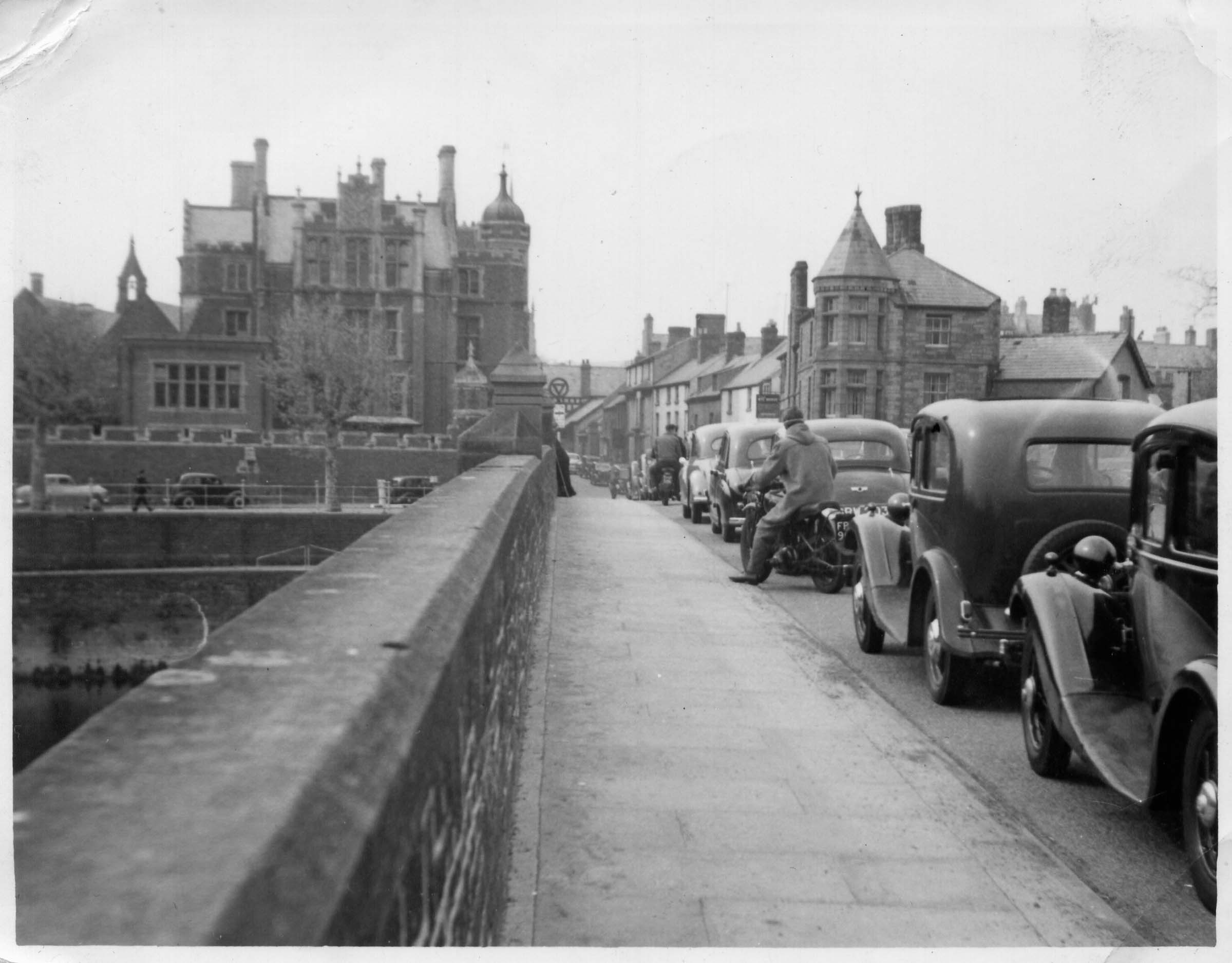

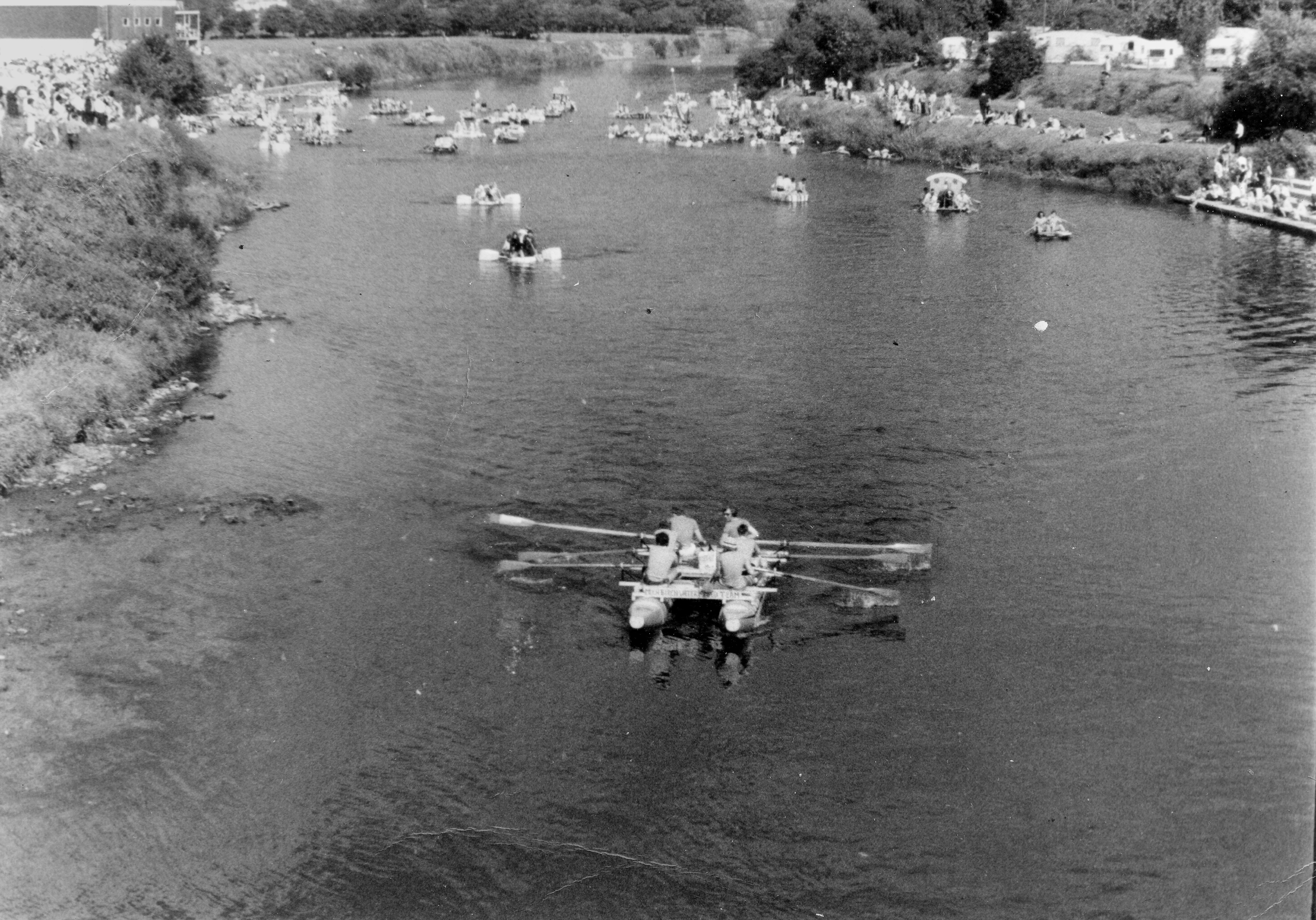
a view of Monmouth raft race from the bridge, 1960s

== See also ==
- List of crossings of the River Wye
- List of bridges in Wales

== Sources ==
- Crow, Alan (1995). Bridges on the River Wye. Lapridge Publications. ISBN 0-9518589-9-8.
- Kissack, Keith (1974). Mediaeval Monmouth. Monmouth: Monmouth Historical and Educational Trust.
- Rowlands, M. L. J. (1994). Monnow Bridge and Gate. Stroud: Alan Sutton. ISBN 978-0-7509-0415-5.
