= Stowfield quarry =

Quarry in the Forest of Dean, Gloucestershire, England

Coordinates: 51.7983°N 2.6452°W

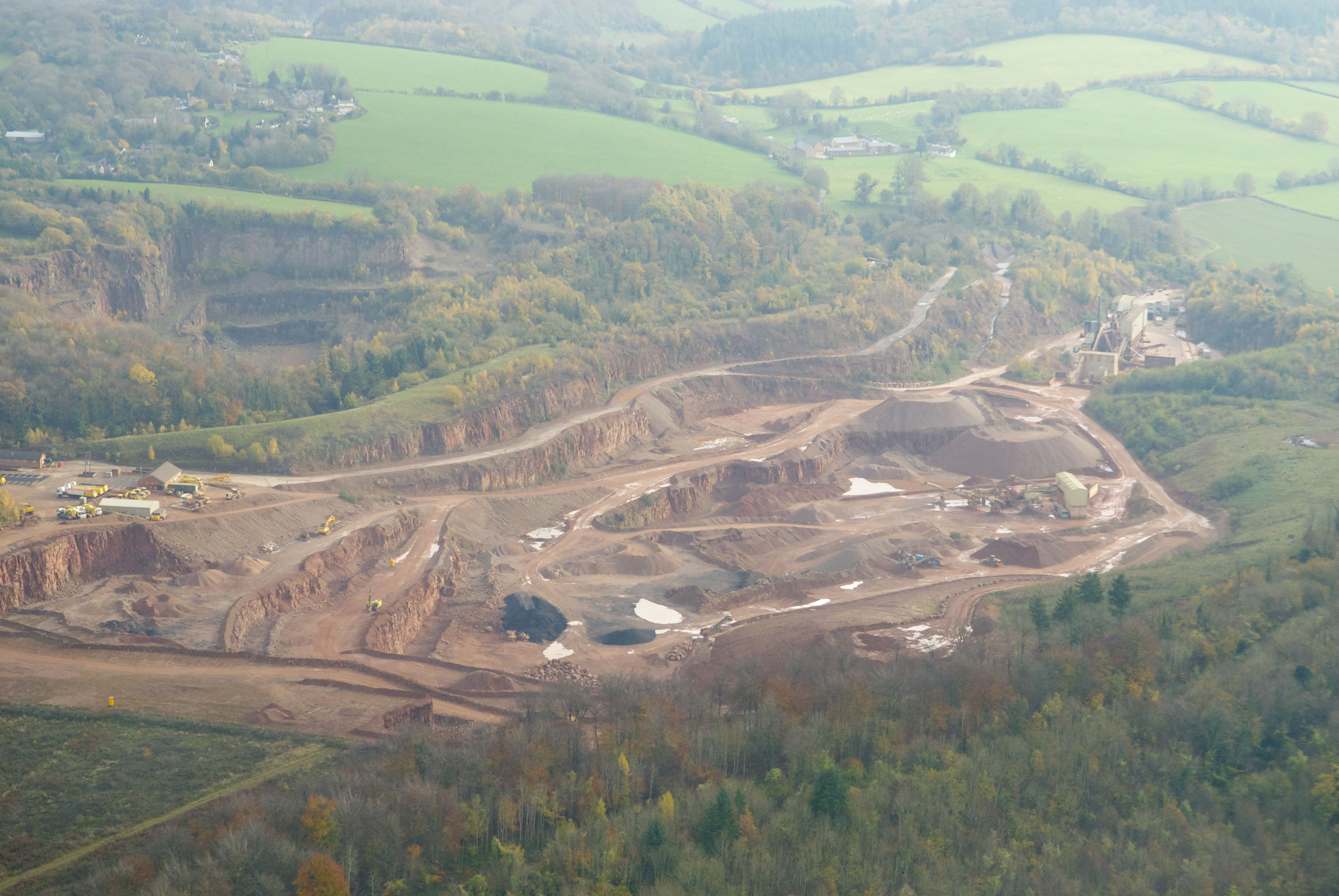

Stowfield quarry is a limestone quarry in the Forest of Dean about 2 km south of Staunton, near Coleford, Gloucestershire, England. As well as primary extraction of limestone as aggregates, the quarry crushing plant also produces secondary crushed materials from off-site wastes, such as demolition concrete and road planings, to produce MOT Type 1 and 6F2 / 6F5 materials.
