= Wysis Way =

Walking route in the United Kingdom

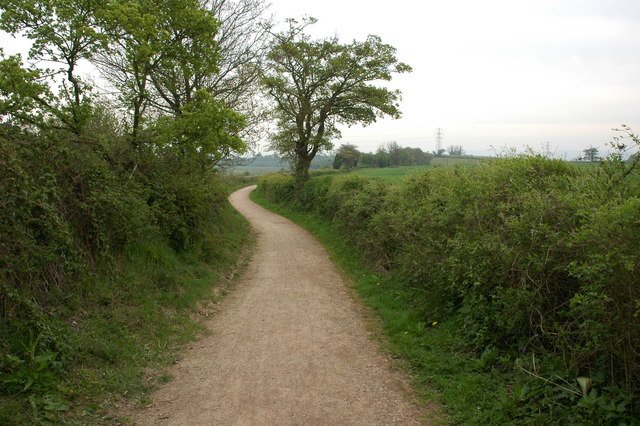
- Length: 88 km (55 mi)
- Trailheads: Monmouth, Wales; Kemble, Gloucestershire, England
- Use: Hiking

The Wysis Way is an 88 km (55 mi) walking route which forms a link between the Offa's Dyke Path and Thames Path national trails in the United Kingdom. The Way runs between Monmouth in Wales and Kemble, Gloucestershire in England.

== Route detail ==
Starting from the Wye Bridge in Monmouth, the Wysis Way heads eastwards up The Kymin and into the Forest of Dean. Heading primarily eastwards, the trail goes through Hillersland before continuing through the forest, passing through Nailsbridge, Harrow Hill and Mitcheldean on its way to the top of May Hill (296 m (971 ft)) and views of the River Severn. From May Hill, it continues eastward through Glasshouse, Taynton, Tibberton and the edge of Highnam before reaching Gloucester. At Gloucester, the trail starts to head more southerly but still in an eastern direction up to the trig point on Robinswood Hill (198 m (650 ft)) before continuing southeasterly through Painswick, Bisley and Oakridge Lynch where it turns east along the River Frome and the Thames and Severn Canal to Daneway and Sapperton, Gloucestershire before reaching its end in Kemble, where it meets the Thames Path.

== See also ==
- Map of Wysis Way compiled from this article
