= Tewkesbury Borough Council elections =

Local gov. elections in Tewkesbury, England

Tewkesbury Borough Council is the local authority for the Borough of Tewkesbury in Gloucestershire, England. The whole council is elected together every four years. Since the last boundary changes in 2019, a total of 38 councillors have been elected from 20 wards.

== Election results ==
Composition of the council
Year	Conservative	Liberal Democrats (Note: Includes totals for the predecessors of the Liberal Democrats, the Liberal Party and SDP (both of which participated in the Alliance).)	Labour	Green (Note: Includes totals for the predecessors of the Green Party of England and Wales, the Ecology Party and Green Party UK.)	Independents & Others	Council control after election
Local government reorganisation; council established (51 seats)
1973	23	3	1	–	24	No overall control
1976	21	2	1	0	27	Independent
1979	19	4	1	0	27	Independent
New ward boundaries (45 seats)
1983	13	2	0	0	30	Independent
1987	17	5	1	0	22	No overall control
New ward boundaries (36 seats)
1991	7	6	2	0	21	Independent
1995	3	8	4	0	21	No overall control
1999	13	4	8	0	11	No overall control
New ward boundaries (38 seats)
2003	18	9	3	0	8 (Note: 4 Tewkesbury Independent, 3 Brockworth Residents Group, 1 Independent)	No overall control
2007	19	17	0	0	2 (Note: 2 Tewkesbury Independents)	No overall control
2011	24	11	0	0	3 (Note: 2 Tewkesbury Independent, 1 Independent)	Conservative
2015	33	3	0	0	2	Conservative
New ward boundaries (38 seats)
2019	23	8	0	1	6 (Note: 4 Independents, 2 Tewkesbury & Twyning Independents)	No overall control
2023	9	16	0	4	9 (Note: 7 Independents, 2 Tewkesbury & Twyning Independents)	No overall control

== Results maps ==
2003 results map

2007 results map

2011 results map

2015 results map

2019 results map

2023 results map

== By-election results ==
=== 2003–2007 ===
Brockworth By-Election 13 November 2003
Party	Candidate	Votes	%	±%
Brockworth Residents Group		526	33.6	−7.8
Labour		437	27.9	−4.0
Liberal Democrats		344	22.0	+22.0
Conservative		228	14.6	−3.3
Green		21	2.0	−6.7
Majority		89	5.7	
Turnout		1,556		
Brockworth Residents Group hold		Swing		

Northway By-Election 30 November 2006
Party	Candidate	Votes	%	±%
Liberal Democrats		250	33.3	+33.3
Conservative		205	27.3	−2.7
Independent		202	26.9	+26.9
Labour		93	12.4	−35.2
Majority		45	6.0	
Turnout		750		
Liberal Democrats gain from Labour		Swing		

Brockworth By-Election 1 February 2007
Party	Candidate	Votes	%	±%
Liberal Democrats		639	45.3	+45.3
Conservative		343	24.3	+6.4
Labour		237	16.8	−15.1
Brockworth Residents Group		193	13.7	−27.7
Majority		296	21.0	
Turnout		1,412		
Liberal Democrats gain from Brockworth Residents Group		Swing		

=== 2007–2011 ===
Churchdown Brookfield By-Election 16 October 2008
Party	Candidate	Votes	%	±%
Independent	Brian Jones	598	39.0	−0.8
Liberal Democrats	Tony Stokes	508	33.2	−8.9
Conservative		364	23.8	+4.4
Labour		62	4.0	−1.4
Majority		90	5.9	
Turnout		1,532		
Independent gain from Liberal Democrats		Swing		

Brockworth By-Election 4 June 2009
Party	Candidate	Votes	%	±%
Liberal Democrats	Judith Perez	940	52.7	+17.2
Conservative	Ronald Furolo	679	38.1	+9.5
Labour	Keir Dhillon	164	9.2	N/A
Majority		261	14.6	
Turnout		1,783		
Liberal Democrats hold		Swing		

=== 2011–2015 ===
Brockworth By-Election 22 May 2014
Party	Candidate	Votes	%	±%
Conservative	Harry Turbyfield	685	37.4	−2.5
Labour	Edward Buxton	455	24.9	+24.9
Liberal Democrats	Phillip Quarry	409	22.3	−37.8
Green	Robert Rendell	281	15.4	+15.4
Majority		230	12.6	
Turnout		1,830		
Conservative gain from Liberal Democrats		Swing		

=== 2019–2023 ===
Cleve Hill by-election 6 May 2021
Party	Candidate	Votes	%	±%
Conservative	Khatija Berliner (Keja Berliner)	910	46.1	−1.8
Liberal Democrats	Lorraine Agg	842	42.7	+13.1
Green	Robey Jenkins	114	5.8	−9.6
Labour	Emma Robertson	107	5.4	−1.8
Majority		68	3.4	
Turnout		1973		
Conservative hold		Swing		

Brockworth East By-Election 18 November 2021
Party	Candidate	Votes	%	±%
Independent	Charlotte Mills	499	68.3	+68.3
Conservative	Ronald Furolo	110	15.0	−9.5
Liberal Democrats	Gilbert Yates	87	11.9	−1.0
Labour	Joseph Ambrose	35	4.8	+4.8
Majority		389	53.2	
Turnout		731		
Independent hold		Swing		

Brockworth East By-Election 14 April 2022
Party	Candidate	Votes	%	±%
Independent	Jason Mills	346	69.5	+69.5
Conservative	Marc Barwick	76	15.3	−9.2
Liberal Democrats	Gilbert Yates	76	15.3	+2.4
Majority		270	54.2	
Turnout		498		
Independent hold		Swing		

=== 2023–2027 ===
Innsworth By-Election 1 May 2025
Party	Candidate	Votes	%	±%
Liberal Democrats	Rojina Rai	666	46.6	
Reform	Graham Bocking	596	41.7	
Labour	Veronica Davies	93	6.5	
Green	Jonathan Bristow	75	5.2	
Majority		70	4.9	
Turnout		1,442	29.49	
Liberal Democrats hold				

Northway By-Election 10 July 2025
Party	Candidate	Votes	%	±%
Reform	Graham Bocking	374	41.4	N/A
Liberal Democrats	Guy Fancourt	279	30.9	–0.1
Conservative	Kevin Cromwell	116	12.8	–18.8
Green	James Robins	91	10.1	N/A
Labour	Joe Jones	44	4.9	–21.9
Majority		95	10.5	N/A
Turnout		905	25.31	
Reform gain from Independent				
