= 2011 Tewkesbury Borough Council election =

Tewkesbury Borough Council election in 2011

Results of the 2011 Tewkesbury Borough Council election

The 2011 Tewkesbury Borough Council election took place on 5 May 2011 to elect members of Tewkesbury Borough Council in England. This was on the same day as other local elections. The Conservative Party gained control of the council.

== Election result ==
2011 Tewkesbury Borough Council election
Party	Seats	Gains	Losses	Net gain/loss	Seats %	Votes %	Votes	+/−
Conservative	24	6	1	▲5	63.2	45.8	11,004	+1.2
Liberal Democrats	11	0	6	▼6	28.9	29.8	7,167	-5.0
Labour	0	0	0	Steady	0.0	12.1	2,896	+6.8
Independent	1	1	0	▲1	2.6	8.0	1,962	+0.1
TTI	2	1	1	Steady	5.3	4.3	1,033	-2.0

== Ward results ==
=== Ashchurch with Walton Cardiff ===
Ashchurch with Walton Cardiff Ward (2 Councillors)
Party	Candidate	Votes	%	±%
Conservative	Barry Hesketh	620	50.6	+8.0
Conservative	Adam Tugwell*	567	46.3	−0.8
Liberal Democrats	Cait Clucas	414	33.8	−8.0
Labour	Raghu Shyampant	329	26.9	N/A
Majority		153	12.5	
Turnout		1,225	40.06	
Conservative hold		Swing		
Conservative hold		Swing		

=== Badgeworth ===
Badgeworth Ward (1 Councillor)
Party	Candidate	Votes	%	±%
Conservative	Robert Vines*	606	75.6	+3.4
Liberal Democrats	Stephen Wall	196	24.4	−3.4
Majority		410	51.2	
Turnout		802	44.87	
Conservative hold		Swing		

=== Brockworth ===
Brockworth Ward (3 Councillors)
Party	Candidate	Votes	%	±%
Liberal Democrats	Maureen Quarry*	1,151	56.2	±0.0
Liberal Democrats	Judith Perez*	1,142	55.8	+20.3
Liberal Democrats	Vincent Perez	1,028	50.2	+15.3
Conservative	Ronald Furolo	763	37.3	+8.7
Conservative	Edward Buxton	725	35.4	+5.3
Conservative	Harry Turbyfield	600	29.3	+7.9
Majority		265	12.9	
Turnout		2,048	37.69	
Liberal Democrats hold		Swing		
Liberal Democrats hold		Swing		
Liberal Democrats hold		Swing		

=== Churchdown Brookfield ===
Churchdown Brookfield Ward (2 Councillors)
Party	Candidate	Votes	%	±%
Independent	Brian Jones*	723	37.9	−1.9
Liberal Democrats	Gillian Blackwell	619	32.4	−9.7
Liberal Democrats	Richard Smith*	608	31.9	−11.6
Conservative	Richard Bishop	572	30.0	+11.9
Conservative	Julie Evans	476	24.9	+5.5
Labour	David Carter	307	16.1	+10.7
Labour	Sarah Dhillon	230	12.1	+8.0
Majority		11	0.5	
Turnout		1,908	56.05	
Independent gain from Liberal Democrats		Swing		
Liberal Democrats hold		Swing		

=== Churchdown St John's ===
Churchdown St John's Ward (3 Councillors)
Party	Candidate	Votes	%	±%
Liberal Democrats	Pearl Stokes*	1,210	50.5	−0.3
Liberal Democrats	Kay Berry*	1,195	49.9	−0.2
Liberal Democrats	Audrey Ricks*	1,134	47.4	−0.1
Conservative	Graham Bocking	678	28.3	−12.1
Conservative	Janet Maund	666	27.8	+10.2
Conservative	Ian Grubb	665	27.8	−10.1
Labour	Royston Ansley	397	16.6	+9.1
Labour	Kelvin Tustin	392	16.4	N/A
Labour	Keir Dhillon	387	16.2	−8.8
Majority		456	19.1	
Turnout		2,394	44.94	
Liberal Democrats hold		Swing		
Liberal Democrats hold		Swing		
Liberal Democrats hold		Swing		

=== Cleeve Grange ===
Cleeve Grange Ward (1 Councillor)
Party	Candidate	Votes	%	±%
Liberal Democrats	Susan Hillier-Richardson*	476	57.7	−11.5
Conservative	Paul Hughes	265	32.1	+6.5
Labour	Charlotte Collins	84	10.2	+5.0
Majority		211	25.6	
Turnout		825	51.36	
Liberal Democrats hold		Swing		

=== Cleeve Hill ===
Cleeve Hill Ward (2 Councillors)
Party	Candidate	Votes	%	±%
Conservative	Mike Dean	Unopposed	N/A	−70.9
Conservative	Margaret Ogden*	Unopposed	N/A	−68.1
Majority		N/A	N/A	
Turnout		N/A	N/A	
Conservative hold		Swing		
Conservative hold		Swing		

=== Cleeve St Michael's ===
Cleeve St Michael's Ward (2 Councillors)
Party	Candidate	Votes	%	±%
Conservative	Robert East	682	44.8	+3.4
Liberal Democrats	Hannah Healy	681	44.7	−6.5
Liberal Democrats	Philip Taylor*	669	43.9	−9.2
Conservative	David Hearn	440	28.9	−8.8
Labour	Laura Collins	188	12.3	N/A
Labour	Thomas Ware	128	8.4	N/A
Majority		12	0.8	
Turnout		1,523	44.28	
Conservative gain from Liberal Democrats		Swing		
Liberal Democrats hold		Swing		

=== Cleeve West ===
Cleeve West Ward (2 Councillors)
Party	Candidate	Votes	%	±%
Conservative	Robert Bird	708	44.2	+7.4
Liberal Democrats	Tony MacKinnon*	702	43.8	−18.8
Liberal Democrats	Peter Richmond*	662	41.3	−17.4
Conservative	Alan Whittaker	637	39.8	+12.9
Labour	Stuart Emmerson	139	8.7	N/A
Labour	Lissa Rogers	120	7.5	N/A
Majority		40	2.5	
Turnout		1,601	47.84	
Conservative gain from Liberal Democrats		Swing		
Liberal Democrats hold		Swing		

=== Coombe Hill ===
Coombe Hill Ward (2 Councillors)
Party	Candidate	Votes	%	±%
Conservative	David Waters*	Unopposed	N/A	−59.2
Conservative	Mark Williams*	Unopposed	N/A	−61.1
Majority		N/A	N/A	
Turnout		N/A	N/A	
Conservative hold		Swing		
Conservative hold		Swing		

=== Highnam with Haw Bridge ===
Highnam with Haw Bridge Ward (2 Councillors)
Party	Candidate	Votes	%	±%
Conservative	Philip Awford*	1,250	65.6	−0.6
Conservative	Derek Davies*	1,187	62.3	−1.4
Labour	Thomas Elsey	471	24.7	+15.6
Majority		716	37.6	
Turnout		1,906	54.46	
Conservative hold		Swing		
Conservative hold		Swing		

=== Hucclecote ===
Hucclecote Ward (1 Councillor)
Party	Candidate	Votes	%	±%
Conservative	Marc Silverthorn	305	56.2	+19.5
Liberal Democrats	Ibraheem Aruna	238	43.8	−19.5
Majority		67	12.4	
Turnout		543	47.43	
Conservative gain from Liberal Democrats		Swing		

=== Innsworth with Down Hatherley ===
Innsworth with Down Hatherley Ward (1 Councillor)
Party	Candidate	Votes	%	±%
Liberal Democrats	Bill Whelan*	344	47.6	+0.2
Conservative	Roger Fox	241	33.4	+4.3
Independent	Paul Ockelton	137	19.0	−4.6
Majority		103	14.2	
Turnout		722	40.17	
Liberal Democrats hold		Swing		

=== Isbourne ===
Isbourne Ward (1 Councillor)
Party	Candidate	Votes	%	±%
Conservative	John Evetts*	656	70.8	−8.5
Liberal Democrats	Patrick Cullen	271	29.2	+8.5
Majority		385	41.6	
Turnout		792	47.43	
Conservative hold		Swing		

=== Northway ===
Northway Ward (2 Councillors)
Party	Candidate	Votes	%	±%
Conservative	Elaine MacTiernan	490	41.2	+17.2
Conservative	Adele Carter	468	39.4	+15.4
Independent	David Oughton	398	33.5	+12.5
Labour	Alan Lewis	291	24.5	−3.2
Independent	Barbara Cromwell	288	24.2	N/A
Labour	John Hurley	184	15.5	−1.8
Majority		70	5.9	
Turnout		1,188	31.01	
Conservative gain from Liberal Democrats		Swing		
Conservative gain from Liberal Democrats		Swing		

=== Oxenton Hill ===
Oxenton Hill Ward (1 Councillor)
Party	Candidate	Votes	%	±%
Conservative	Allen Keyte*	Unopposed	N/A	−80.7
Majority		N/A	N/A	
Turnout		N/A	N/A	
Conservative hold		Swing		

=== Shurdington ===
Shurdington (1 Councillor)
Party	Candidate	Votes	%	±%
Conservative	Philip Surman*	500	69.0	+9.9
Independent	Jane Attwood	225	31.0	N/A
Majority		275	38.0	
Turnout		725	48.41	
Conservative hold		Swing		

=== Tewkesbury Newtown ===
Tewkesbury Newtown Ward (1 Councillor)
Party	Candidate	Votes	%	±%
Conservative	Vernon Smith	Unopposed	N/A	−32.8
Majority		N/A	N/A	
Turnout		N/A	N/A	
Conservative gain from Tewkesbury Independents		Swing		

=== Tewkesbury Prior's Park ===
Tewkesbury Prior's Park Ward (2 Councillors)
Party	Candidate	Votes	%	±%
Conservative	Brian Calway*	627	62.2	+6.7
Conservative	Ellen Wright*	582	57.7	+8.5
Labour	Michael Reynolds	257	25.5	−1.1
Labour	Lloyd Ward	212	21.0	+6.2
Liberal Democrats	Stephen Woodrow	196	19.4	+9.7
Majority		325	32.2	
Turnout		1,008	33.46	
Conservative hold		Swing		
Conservative hold		Swing		

=== Tewkesbury Town with Mitton ===
Tewkesbury Town with Mitton Ward (2 Councillors)
Party	Candidate	Votes	%	±%
Tewkesbury Independents	Michael Sztymiak*	1,033	59.6	+4.8
Tewkesbury Independents	Philip Workman	818	47.2	+12.7
Conservative	Elaine Hancox*	593	34.2	−5.9
Conservative	Kevin Cromwell	474	27.3	+17.7
Independent	Kenneth Powell	433	25.0	N/A
Majority		225	13.0	
Turnout		1,734	46.42	
Tewkesbury Independents hold		Swing		
Tewkesbury Independents gain from Conservative		Swing		

=== Twyning ===
Twyning Ward (1 Councillor)
Party	Candidate	Votes	%	±%
Conservative	Gordon Shurmer*	Unopposed	N/A	−72.3
Majority		N/A	N/A	
Turnout		N/A	N/A	
Conservative hold		Swing		

=== Winchcombe ===
Winchcombe Ward (3 Councillors)
Party	Candidate	Votes	%	±%
Conservative	Ronald Allen*	1,448	57.6	−0.1
Conservative	James Mason*	1,434	57.0	−1.6
Conservative	Janet Day*	1,416	56.3	+1.7
Liberal Democrats	Timothy Hall	669	26.6	+1.4
Liberal Democrats	Kevin Guyll	656	26.1	−1.8
Labour	David Hilton	433	17.2	+0.5
Labour	Lynette Hurley	413	16.4	+6.8
Majority		747	29.7	
Turnout		2,516	49.11	
Conservative hold		Swing		
Conservative hold		Swing		
Conservative hold		Swing		

== By-Elections ==
Brockworth By-Election 22 May 2014
Party	Candidate	Votes	%	±%
Conservative	Harry Turbyfield	685	37.4	+8.1
Labour	Edward Buxton	455	24.9	−10.5
Liberal Democrats	Phillip Quarry	409	22.3	−33.9
Green	Robert Rendell	281	15.4	N/A
Majority		230	12.6	
Turnout		1,830		
Conservative gain from Liberal Democrats		Swing		
