= 2003 Tewkesbury Borough Council election =

Tewkesbury Borough Council election

Results of the 2003 Tewkesbury Borough Council election

The 2003 Tewkesbury Borough Council election took place on 1 May 2003 to elect members of Tewkesbury Borough Council in England. This was on the same day as other local elections. The whole council was up for election on new ward boundaries.

== Election results ==
2003 Tewkesbury Borough Council election
| Party | Seats | Gains | Losses | Net gain/loss | Seats % | Votes % | Votes | +/− |
|---|---|---|---|---|---|---|---|---|
| Conservative | 17 | | | ▲4 | 44.7 | 43.0 | 10,000 | |
| Liberal Democrats | 10 | | | ▲6 | 26.3 | 28.1 | 6,535 | |
| Labour | 3 | | | ▼5 | 7.9 | 11.0 | 2,551 | |
| TTI | 4 | | | ▲4 | 10.5 | 7.5 | 1,756 | |
| Independent | 1 | | | ▼10 | 2.6 | 6.1 | 1,422 | |
| Brockworth Residents Group | 3 | | | ▲3 | 7.9 | 3.6 | 830 | |
| Green | 0 | | | Steady | 0.0 | 0.8 | 175 | |

== Ward results ==
=== Ashchurch with Walton Cardiff ===
Ashchurch with Walton Cardiff Ward (2 Councillors)
| Party | Candidate | Votes | % | ±% |
|---|---|---|---|---|
| Liberal Democrats | Caitriona Clucas | 305 | 39.9 | |
| Tewkesbury Independents | Philip Workman | 274 | 35.9 | |
| Liberal Democrats | John Clucas | 268 | 35.1 | |
| Tewkesbury Independents | Ronald Hopkins | 219 | 28.7 | |
| Conservative | Adam Tugwell | 204 | 26.7 | |
| Conservative | Mary Kirby | 173 | 22.6 | |
| Majority | | 6 | 0.8 | |
| Turnout | | 764 | 34.0 | |
| Liberal Democrats win (new seat) | | | | |
| Tewkesbury Independents win (new seat) | | | | |

=== Badgeworth ===
Badgeworth Ward (1 Councillor)
| Party | Candidate | Votes | % | ±% |
|---|---|---|---|---|
| Conservative | Robert Vines* | 395 | 66.9 | |
| Liberal Democrats | Janice Ledeux | 195 | 33.1 | |
| Majority | | 200 | 33.8 | |
| Turnout | | 590 | 33.0 | |
| Conservative win (new seat) | | | | |

=== Brockworth ===
Brockworth Ward (3 Councillors)
| Party | Candidate | Votes | % | ±% |
|---|---|---|---|---|
| Brockworth Residents Group | Godfrey Browning | 830 | 44.2 | |
| Brockworth Residents Group | Sean Connors* | 754 | 40.2 | |
| Brockworth Residents Group | Colin Gomersall | 694 | 37.0 | |
| Labour | Mark Hendry* | 640 | 34.1 | |
| Labour | Louise Gerrard* | 555 | 29.6 | |
| Labour | Susan Dunn | 515 | 27.4 | |
| Conservative | David Hunt | 359 | 19.1 | |
| Conservative | Ronald Chapman | 293 | 15.6 | |
| Conservative | Ian Barnes | 248 | 13.2 | |
| Green | Robert Rendell | 175 | 9.3 | |
| Majority | | 54 | 2.9 | |
| Turnout | | 1,877 | 37.6 | |
| Brockworth Residents Group win (new seat) | | | | |
| Brockworth Residents Group win (new seat) | | | | |
| Brockworth Residents Group win (new seat) | | | | |

=== Churchdown Brookfield ===
Churchdown Brookfield Ward (2 Councillors)
| Party | Candidate | Votes | % | ±% |
|---|---|---|---|---|
| Liberal Democrats | Richard Smith* | 840 | 54.2 | |
| Conservative | Brian Jones* | 778 | 50.2 | |
| Liberal Democrats | Anthony Stokes | 725 | 46.8 | |
| Conservative | Greg Ching | 610 | 39.4 | |
| Majority | | 53 | 3.4 | |
| Turnout | | 1,550 | 46.0 | |
| Liberal Democrats win (new seat) | | | | |
| Conservative win (new seat) | | | | |

=== Churchdown St John's ===
Churchdown St John's Ward (3 Councillors)
| Party | Candidate | Votes | % | ±% |
|---|---|---|---|---|
| Liberal Democrats | Hazel Finch | 749 | 44.3 | |
| Liberal Democrats | Pearl Stokes* | 749 | 44.3 | |
| Liberal Democrats | Audrey Ricks | 592 | 35.1 | |
| Conservative | Neville Nutting | 590 | 34.9 | |
| Conservative | Belinda Hope | 517 | 30.6 | |
| Conservative | Angela Ockelton | 474 | 28.1 | |
| Labour | Kelvin Tustin* | 381 | 22.6 | |
| Labour | Keir Dhillon* | 364 | 21.6 | |
| Labour | Ann Lightfoot | 278 | 16.5 | |
| Majority | | 2 | 0.2 | |
| Turnout | | 1,689 | 33.0 | |
| Liberal Democrats win (new seat) | | | | |
| Liberal Democrats win (new seat) | | | | |
| Liberal Democrats win (new seat) | | | | |

=== Cleeve Grange ===
Cleeve Grange Ward (1 Councillor)
| Party | Candidate | Votes | % | ±% |
|---|---|---|---|---|
| Liberal Democrats | Susan Hillier-Richardson | 441 | 62.2 | |
| Conservative | Mark Calway* | 224 | 31.6 | |
| Labour | Peter Lightfoot | 44 | 6.2 | |
| Majority | | 217 | 30.6 | |
| Turnout | | 709 | 44.0 | |
| Liberal Democrats win (new seat) | | | | |

=== Cleeve Hill ===
Cleeve Hill Ward (2 Councillors)
| Party | Candidate | Votes | % | ±% |
|---|---|---|---|---|
| Conservative | Kenneth Leech | 763 | 63.7 | |
| Conservative | Florence Ogden* | 630 | 52.6 | |
| Liberal Democrats | Colin Tudor | 571 | 47.7 | |
| Majority | | 59 | 4.9 | |
| Turnout | | 1,198 | 44.0 | |
| Conservative win (new seat) | | | | |
| Conservative win (new seat) | | | | |

=== Cleeve St Michael's ===
Cleeve St Michael's Ward (2 Councillors)
| Party | Candidate | Votes | % | ±% |
|---|---|---|---|---|
| Conservative | Robert East* | 625 | 65.9 | |
| Conservative | Michael Beresford* | 530 | 55.9 | |
| Liberal Democrats | John Danes | 300 | 31.6 | |
| Liberal Democrats | Michael Dray | 187 | 19.7 | |
| Independent | Eric Foster | 122 | 12.9 | |
| Majority | | 230 | 24.3 | |
| Turnout | | 948 | 32.0 | |
| Conservative win (new seat) | | | | |
| Conservative win (new seat) | | | | |

=== Cleeve West ===
Cleeve West Ward (2 Councillors)
| Party | Candidate | Votes | % | ±% |
|---|---|---|---|---|
| Liberal Democrats | Peter Richmond | 706 | 64.4 | |
| Liberal Democrats | Anthony MacKinnon | 683 | 62.3 | |
| Conservative | Clive Lawrence | 328 | 29.9 | |
| Conservative | Michael Wright | 239 | 21.8 | |
| Labour | Robert Trafford | 85 | 7.8 | |
| Majority | | 355 | 32.4 | |
| Turnout | | 1,096 | 33.0 | |
| Liberal Democrats win (new seat) | | | | |
| Liberal Democrats win (new seat) | | | | |

=== Coombe Hill ===
Coombe Hill Ward (2 Councillors)
| Party | Candidate | Votes | % | ±% |
|---|---|---|---|---|
| Conservative | Mark Williams* | 690 | 58.1 | |
| Conservative | Bruce Stephens* | 649 | 54.7 | |
| Liberal Democrats | Sarah Olney | 320 | 27.0 | |
| Independent | Lennard Attard | 298 | 25.1 | |
| Majority | | 329 | 27.7 | |
| Turnout | | 1,187 | 33.0 | |
| Conservative win (new seat) | | | | |
| Conservative win (new seat) | | | | |

=== Highnam with Haw Bridge ===
Highnam with Haw Bridge Ward (2 Councillors)
| Party | Candidate | Votes | % | ±% |
|---|---|---|---|---|
| Conservative | Derek Davies | 904 | 56.7 | |
| Conservative | Philip Awford | 861 | 54.0 | |
| Liberal Democrats | Patricia Duggan | 623 | 39.1 | |
| Liberal Democrats | Helen Hughes | 608 | 38.1 | |
| Majority | | 238 | 14.9 | |
| Turnout | | 1,595 | 44.0 | |
| Conservative win (new seat) | | | | |
| Conservative win (new seat) | | | | |

=== Hucclecote ===
Hucclecote Ward (1 Councillor)
| Party | Candidate | Votes | % | ±% |
|---|---|---|---|---|
| Liberal Democrats | Peter Brazil | 309 | 60.8 | |
| Labour | Peter Sharples | 116 | 22.8 | |
| Conservative | Gary Phipps | 83 | 16.3 | |
| Majority | | 193 | 38.0 | |
| Turnout | | 508 | 42.0 | |
| Liberal Democrats win (new seat) | | | | |

=== Innsworth with Down Hatherley ===
Innsworth with Down Hatherley Ward (1 Councillor)
| Party | Candidate | Votes | % | ±% |
|---|---|---|---|---|
| Conservative | Paul Ockelton* | 386 | 51.9 | |
| Liberal Democrats | William Whelan | 358 | 48.1 | |
| Majority | | 28 | 3.8 | |
| Turnout | | 744 | 43.0 | |
| Conservative win (new seat) | | | | |

=== Isbourne ===
Isbourne Ward (1 Councillor)
| Party | Candidate | Votes | % | ±% |
|---|---|---|---|---|
| Independent | John Evetts* | 631 | 70.6 | |
| Conservative | Judith Gilder | 263 | 29.4 | |
| Majority | | 368 | 41.2 | |
| Turnout | | 894 | 54.1 | |
| Independent win (new seat) | | | | |

=== Northway ===
Northway Ward (2 Councillors)
| Party | Candidate | Votes | % | ±% |
|---|---|---|---|---|
| Labour | Margaret Levett* | 380 | 54.3 | |
| Labour | Patrick McCarthy | 253 | 36.1 | |
| Conservative | Mary Harper* | 240 | 34.3 | |
| Conservative | Stuart Shepherd | 191 | 27.3 | |
| Independent | Henry Tychmanowicz | 179 | 25.6 | |
| Majority | | 13 | 1.8 | |
| Turnout | | 700 | 19.8 | |
| Labour win (new seat) | | | | |
| Labour win (new seat) | | | | |

=== Oxenton Hill ===
Oxenton Hill (1 Councillor)
| Party | Candidate | Votes | % | ±% |
|---|---|---|---|---|
| Conservative | Allen Keyte | 497 | 88.6 | |
| Liberal Democrats | Alastair Mason | 64 | 11.4 | |
| Majority | | 433 | 77.2 | |
| Turnout | | 561 | 44.8 | |
| Conservative win (new seat) | | | | |

=== Shurdington ===
Shurdington (1 Councillor)
| Party | Candidate | Votes | % | ±% |
|---|---|---|---|---|
| Conservative | Philip Surman | 379 | 72.5 | |
| Labour | Donald McLellan | 144 | 27.5 | |
| Majority | | 235 | 45.0 | |
| Turnout | | 523 | 34.0 | |
| Conservative win (new seat) | | | | |

=== Tewkesbury Newtown ===
Tewkesbury Newtown (1 Councillor)
| Party | Candidate | Votes | % | ±% |
|---|---|---|---|---|
| Tewkesbury Independents | John McCloy* | 480 | 78.6 | |
| Conservative | Graham Dawson | 131 | 21.4 | |
| Majority | | 349 | 57.2 | |
| Turnout | | 611 | 39.0 | |
| Tewkesbury Independents win (new seat) | | | | |

=== Tewkesbury Prior's Park ===
Tewkesbury Prior's Park Ward (2 Councillors)
| Party | Candidate | Votes | % | ±% |
|---|---|---|---|---|
| Labour | Joan Sklenar* | 327 | 38.4 | |
| Conservative | Brian Calway | 298 | 35.0 | |
| Conservative | Peter Aldridge | 272 | 32.0 | |
| Labour | Joan Collip | 222 | 26.1 | |
| Independent | Robert Devine | 192 | 22.6 | |
| Tewkesbury Independents | Christine Donald | 80 | 9.4 | |
| Liberal Democrats | Brenda Dick | 73 | 8.6 | |
| Majority | | 26 | 3.0 | |
| Turnout | | 851 | 25.0 | |
| Labour win (new seat) | | | | |
| Conservative win (new seat) | | | | |

=== Tewkesbury Town with Mitton ===
Tewkesbury Town with Mitton Ward (2 Councillors)
| Party | Candidate | Votes | % | ±% |
|---|---|---|---|---|
| Tewkesbury Independents | Michael Sztymiak* | 776 | 65.2 | |
| Tewkesbury Independents | Barbara Cromwell* | 679 | 57.1 | |
| Conservative | Margaret White | 261 | 21.9 | |
| Liberal Democrats | Gerald Portman | 220 | 18.5 | |
| Conservative | Haydn Pearl | 213 | 17.9 | |
| Majority | | 418 | 35.2 | |
| Turnout | | 1,190 | 35.4 | |
| Tewkesbury Independents win (new seat) | | | | |
| Tewkesbury Independents win (new seat) | | | | |

=== Twyning ===
Twyning (1 Councillor)
| Party | Candidate | Votes | % | ±% |
|---|---|---|---|---|
| Conservative | Gordon Shurmer* | 362 | 63.7 | |
| Tewkesbury Independents | Robert Venables | 146 | 25.7 | |
| Labour | David Playdon | 60 | 10.6 | |
| Majority | | 216 | 38.0 | |
| Turnout | | 568 | 41.0 | |
| Conservative win (new seat) | | | | |

=== Winchcombe ===
Winchcombe Ward (3 Councillors)
| Party | Candidate | Votes | % | ±% |
|---|---|---|---|---|
| Conservative | Ronald Allen* | 1,240 | 63.8 | |
| Conservative | Janet Day* | 1,172 | 60.3 | |
| Conservative | James Mason* | 1,117 | 57.5 | |
| Liberal Democrats | Kevin Guyll | 461 | 23.7 | |
| Labour | Margaret Keir | 374 | 19.2 | |
| Labour | Susan Sturgeon | 348 | 17.9 | |
| Labour | John Hurley | 332 | 17.1 | |
| Majority | | 656 | 33.8 | |
| Turnout | | 1,943 | 39.0 | |
| Conservative win (new seat) | | | | |
| Conservative win (new seat) | | | | |
| Conservative win (new seat) | | | | |
