= 2023 Tewkesbury Borough Council election =

Local election in Gloucestershire, England

- 4 May 2023

All 38 seats to Tewkesbury Borough Council 20 seats needed for a majority

	First party	Second party	Third party
Leader	Mary Jordan	Rob Bird (defeated)	Deborah Harwood
Party	Liberal Democrats	Conservative	Independent
Last election	8 seats, 28.8%	23 seats, 41.6%	4 seats, 8.7%
Seats before	8	23	4 (Note: The four independent councillors prior to the election sat together as the "Brockworth First" group, led by Deborah Harwood.)
Seats won	16	9	7
Seat change	▲8	▼14	▲3
Popular vote	15,232	16,216	4,292
Percentage	32.2%	34.3%	9.1%
Swing	▲3.4%	▼7.3%	▲0.4%
	Fourth party	Fifth party
Leader	Cate Cody	Mike Sztymiak
Party	Green	TTI
Last election	1 seat, 8.5%	2 seats, 5.0%
Seats before	1	2
Seats won	4	2
Seat change	▲3	Steady
Popular vote	7,049	2,345
Percentage	14.9%	5.0%
Swing	▲6.4%	0.0%
- Winner of each seat at the 2023 Tewkesbury Borough Council election
Leader before election
Rob Bird
Conservative
Leader after election
Richard Stanley
Liberal Democrats
No overall control

The 2023 Tewkesbury Borough Council election took place on 4 May 2023 to elect members for the 20 wards of the Tewkesbury Borough Council in England. This was on the same day as other local elections taking place in England.

== Results summary ==
Following the results, the Conservatives lost the council to no overall control for the first time in 16 years. The Conservative leader of the council prior to the election, Rob Bird, lost his seat. Liberal Democrat councillor Richard Stanley was appointed leader of the council at the subsequent annual council meeting on 17 May 2023 with the support of all parties except the Conservatives.

2023 Tewkesbury Borough Council election
Party	Candidates	Seats	Gains	Losses	Net gain/loss	Seats %	Votes %	Votes	+/−
Liberal Democrats	28	16	8	0	▲8	42.1	32.2	15,232	+3.4
Conservative	38	9	0	14	▼14	23.7	34.3	16,216	–7.3
Independent	8	7	3	0	▲3	18.4	9.1	4,292	+0.4
Green	24	4	3	0	▲3	10.5	14.9	7,049	+6.4
Tewkesbury and Twyning Independents	2	2	0	0	Steady	5.3	5.0	2,345	0.0
Labour	10	0	0	0	Steady	0.0	4.6	2,200	–0.6

== Ward results ==
The results for each ward were as follows. Sitting councillors standing for re-election are marked with an asterisk (*).

=== Badgeworth ===
Badgeworth
Party	Candidate	Votes	%	±%
Conservative	Robert Vines*	347	51.2	+1.4
Liberal Democrats	Christine Yates	331	48.8	+24.5
Majority		16	2.4	−23.1
Turnout		685	34.46	+2.3
Rejected ballots		7	1.0	
Registered electors		1,988		
Conservative hold		Swing	-11.0	

=== Brockworth East ===
Brockworth East (2 seats)
Party	Candidate	Votes	%	±%
Independent	Charlotte Mills*	595	76.6	+34.1
Independent	Jason Mills*	478	61.5	+22.3
Liberal Democrats	Kaci Khazeni-Rad	161	20.7	+6.2
Conservative	Judith Hill	108	13.9	−13.6
Conservative	Mike Hill	108	13.9	−8.4
Majority		317	40.8	
Turnout		779	25.79	−4.1
Rejected ballots		2	0.3	
Registered electors		3,021		
Independent hold				
Independent hold				

=== Brockworth West ===
Brockworth West (2 seats)
Party	Candidate	Votes	%	±%
Independent	Deborah Harwood*	671	63.6	+26.7
Independent	Craig Carter*	600	56.9	+18.6
Liberal Democrats	Simon Oliver	259	24.5	+9.9
Conservative	Marc Barwick	254	24.1	−4.6
Conservative	Kathleen Bocking	165	15.6	−11.5
Majority		341	32.3	
Turnout		1,057	26.81	−0.9
Rejected ballots		2	0.2	
Registered electors		3,942		
Independent hold				
Independent hold				

=== Churchdown Brookfield with Hucclecote ===
Churchdown Brookfield with Hucclecote (3 seats)
Party	Candidate	Votes	%	±%
Liberal Democrats	Richard Smith*	944	59.2	+14.9
Liberal Democrats	Paul Smith*	926	58.1	+21.7
Liberal Democrats	Gilbert Yates	898	56.3	+29.8
Conservative	Gillian Blackwell*	529	33.2	+1.4
Conservative	Paul Grierson	459	28.8	+1.4
Conservative	Ron Furolo	332	20.8	−0.1
Green	Jacqueline Totterdell	158	9.9	−6.9
Green	Graham Allen	147	9.2	N/A
Green	Campbell Milne	141	8.8	N/A
Majority		369	23.1	
Turnout		1,603	32.20	+1.0
Rejected ballots		9	0.6	
Registered electors		4,978		
Liberal Democrats hold				
Liberal Democrats hold				
Liberal Democrats gain from Conservative				

=== Churchdown St John's ===
Churchdown St John's (3 seats)
Party	Candidate	Votes	%	±%
Liberal Democrats	Mary Jordan*	1,097	64.8	+14.4
Liberal Democrats	Stewart Dove	1,015	59.9	+20.2
Liberal Democrats	Liz Skelt	986	58.2	+25.3
Conservative	Julie Evans	501	29.6	−2.0
Conservative	Greg Szlowieniec	420	24.8	−5.7
Conservative	Mike Gray	391	23.1	−6.0
Green	Annabel Blackledge	149	8.8	−8.9
Green	Giusi Cavallaro	123	7.3	N/A
Green	Helen Dendulk	122	7.2	N/A
Majority		485	28.6	
Turnout		1,701	30.42	−1.3
Rejected ballots		7	0.4	
Registered electors		5,592		
Liberal Democrats hold				
Liberal Democrats hold				
Liberal Democrats hold				

=== Cleeve Grange ===
Cleeve Grange
Party	Candidate	Votes	%	±%
Liberal Democrats	Thomas Budge	334	49.4	+12.7
Conservative	Andrew Barriskell	243	35.9	+4.5
Labour	Clive Boyd	67	9.9	N/A
Green	Sophie Franklin	32	4.7	−0.9
Majority		91	13.5	+8.2
Turnout		678	33.22	−0.7
Rejected ballots		2	0.3	
Registered electors		2,041		
Liberal Democrats hold		Swing		

=== Cleeve Hill ===
Cleeve Hill (2 seats)
Party	Candidate	Votes	%	±%
Liberal Democrats	Nigel Adcock	943	54.9	+25.1
Liberal Democrats	Lorraine Agg	901	52.4	+20.4
Conservative	Keja Berliner*	811	47.2	−4.6
Conservative	Michael Dean*	679	39.5	−7.3
Majority		90	5.2	
Turnout		1,724	43.38	+6.2
Rejected ballots		6	0.3	
Registered electors		3,974		
Liberal Democrats gain from Conservative				
Liberal Democrats gain from Conservative				

=== Cleeve St Michael's ===
Cleeve St Michael's (2 seats)
Party	Candidate	Votes	%	±%
Liberal Democrats	Alex Hegenbarth	771	57.1	+36.5
Liberal Democrats	Kashan Pervaiz	527	39.0	+19.6
Conservative	Bob East*	446	33.0	−12.1
Conservative	Andrew Reece*	403	29.9	−7.6
Labour	John Peake	148	11.0	−5.0
Green	Kate Aubury	93	6.9	−8.3
Green	Mandy Bown	76	5.6	N/A
Majority		81	6.0	
Turnout		1,353	31.67	+4.4
Rejected ballots		3	0.2	
Registered electors		4,272		
Liberal Democrats gain from Conservative				
Liberal Democrats gain from Conservative				

=== Cleeve West ===
Cleeve West (2 seats)
Party	Candidate	Votes	%	±%
Liberal Democrats	Richard Stanley*	988	66.2	+24.7
Liberal Democrats	Murray Stewart	740	49.6	+17.2
Conservative	Robert Bird*	426	28.6	−14.8
Conservative	Warwick Ross	359	24.1	−14.4
Labour	Elizabeth Harrison	158	10.6	−2.5
Green	Alice North	101	6.8	−9.2
Green	Stephanie Wheeler	71	4.8	N/A
Majority		314	21.0	
Turnout		1,494	35.32	+5.0
Rejected ballots		2	0.1	
Registered electors		4,230		
Liberal Democrats hold				
Liberal Democrats gain from Conservative				

=== Highnam with Haw Bridge ===
Highnam with Haw Bridge (2 seats)
Party	Candidate	Votes	%	±%
Conservative	Jill Smith*	912	60.5	+4.2
Conservative	Paul McLain*	790	52.4	+3.1
Green	Jonathan Bristow	504	33.4	+18.1
Green	Jan Millett	468	31.0	N/A
Majority		286	19.0	
Turnout		1,520	42.70	+3.4
Rejected ballots		12	0.8	
Registered electors		3,560		
Conservative hold				
Conservative hold				

=== Innsworth ===
Innsworth (2 seats)
Party	Candidate	Votes	%	±%
Liberal Democrats	Sarah Hands	485	43.5	N/A
Liberal Democrats	Paul Ockelton*	455	40.8	−4.2
Conservative	Graham Bocking*	414	37.2	−9.1
Conservative	Rojina Pradhan Rai	338	30.3	−12.8
Labour	Veronica Davies	237	21.3	N/A
Independent	Rhiannon Evans	67	6.0	N/A
Majority		41	3.7	
Turnout		1,119	27.88	+7.3
Rejected ballots		5	0.4	
Registered electors		4,013		
Liberal Democrats gain from Conservative				
Liberal Democrats hold				

=== Isbourne ===
Isbourne (2 seats)
Party	Candidate	Votes	%	±%
Independent	Christopher Coleman	719	55.8	N/A
Conservative	Melanie Gore*	450	34.9	−18.9
Conservative	Duncan Smith	384	29.8	−26.2
Liberal Democrats	Pam Taylor	300	23.3	−8.3
Green	Jessica Baddams	164	12.7	−5.4
Labour	Maggie Levett	100	7.8	N/A
Green	Chris White	97	7.5	N/A
Majority		66	5.1	
Turnout		1,291	41.48	+1.9
Rejected ballots		2	0.2	
Registered electors		3,112		
Independent gain from Conservative				
Conservative hold				

=== Northway ===
Northway (2 seats)
Party	Candidate	Votes	%	±%
Independent	Elaine MacTiernan*	348	40.0	+7.4
Conservative	Pauline Godwin*	275	31.6	−1.5
Liberal Democrats	Guy Fancourt	269	31.0	+19.7
Labour	Fiona Castle	233	26.8	+5.9
Conservative	Kevin Cromwell	218	25.1	−7.5
Liberal Democrats	Kevin Guyll	187	21.5	N/A
Majority		6	0.7	
Turnout		872	24.35	+3.5
Rejected ballots		3	0.3	
Registered electors		3,581		
Independent gain from Conservative				
Conservative hold				

=== Severn Vale North ===
Severn Vale North
Party	Candidate	Votes	%	±%
Conservative	Heather McLain*	363	46.1	−14.5
Liberal Democrats	Drewe Lacey	310	39.4	+22.3
Green	Su Billington	114	14.5	−7.9
Majority		53	6.7	−31.4
Turnout		792	39.58	+6.5
Rejected ballots		5	0.6	
Registered electors		2,001		
Conservative hold		Swing	-18.4	

=== Severn Vale South ===
Severn Vale South
Party	Candidate	Votes	%	±%
Conservative	Mark Williams*	468	64.1	+4.4
Liberal Democrats	Martin Griffiths	182	24.9	−0.7
Green	Diane Hyett	80	11.0	−3.7
Majority		286	39.2	+5.1
Turnout		732	40.22	+3.2
Rejected ballots		2	0.3	
Registered electors		1,820		
Conservative hold		Swing	+2.5	

=== Shurdington ===
Shurdington
Party	Candidate	Votes	%	±%
Liberal Democrats	George Porter	354	54.7	+25.9
Conservative	Philip Surman*	293	45.3	−4.6
Majority		61	9.4	N/A
Turnout		651	33.15	+1.4
Rejected ballots		4	0.6	
Registered electors		1,964		
Liberal Democrats gain from Conservative		Swing	+15.2	

=== Tewkesbury East ===
Tewkesbury East (2 seats)
Party	Candidate	Votes	%	±%
Green	Hilarie Bowman	899	62.0	+37.3
Green	Helena Sundarajoo	842	58.0	N/A
Conservative	Vernon Smith*	536	36.9	−14.6
Conservative	Chrissy Reid*	456	31.4	−10.4
Majority		306	21.1	
Turnout		1,458	33.1	+4.2
Rejected ballots		7	0.5	
Registered electors		4,404		
Green gain from Conservative				
Green gain from Conservative				

=== Tewkesbury North and Twyning ===
Tewkesbury North and Twyning (2 seats)
Party	Candidate	Votes	%	±%
TTI	Michael Sztymiak*	1,202	72.7	+10.9
TTI	Philip Workman*	1,143	69.1	+13.5
Labour	Emma Robertson	217	13.1	+5.1
Conservative	Judy Gilder	183	11.1	−4.7
Conservative	Grantham Gilder	179	10.8	−4.2
Liberal Democrats	Katherine Usmar	142	8.6	+1.5
Liberal Democrats	Ben Evans	106	6.4	+2.0
Majority		926	56.0	
Turnout		1,658	40.21	+0.2
Rejected ballots		5	0.3	
Registered electors		4,123		
TTI hold				
TTI hold				

=== Tewkesbury South ===
Tewkesbury South (2 seats)
Party	Candidate	Votes	%	±%
Green	Catherine Cody*	1,025	80.8	+22.0
Green	Matt Dimond-Brown	802	63.2	N/A
Conservative	Tom Coffey	259	20.4	−16.1
Labour	Zoe Darlington	153	12.1	N/A
Conservative	Dan Collins	141	11.1	−23.1
Majority		543	42.8	
Turnout		1,277	32.28	+6.0
Rejected ballots		8	0.6	
Registered electors		3,956		
Green hold				
Green gain from Conservative				

=== Winchcombe ===
Winchcombe (3 seats)
Party	Candidate	Votes	%	±%
Conservative	Jim Mason*	958	45.8	−1.8
Conservative	David Gray*	834	39.8	+7.7
Independent	Gemma Madle	814	38.9	N/A
Conservative	John Murphy*	784	37.5	+7.7
Labour	Sue Sturgeon	514	24.6	+5.7
Labour	John Hurley	373	17.8	+4.7
Green	Caroline Corsie	334	16.0	N/A
Liberal Democrats	Sarah Reford	327	15.6	−9.4
Green	Stuart Galey	304	14.5	N/A
Liberal Democrats	Tony MacKinnon	294	14.0	−9.9
Green	Mandy Walters	203	9.7	N/A
Majority		30	1.4	
Turnout		2,096	39.59	+4.6
Rejected ballots		3	0.1	
Registered electors		5,294		
Conservative hold				
Conservative hold				
Independent gain from Conservative				

== Changes 2023–2027 ==
- In August 2026, Heather McLain, councillor for Severn Vale North, left the Conservatives and joined the Liberal Democrats.
- In July 2026 the government decided that Tewkesbury Borough Council and the other county, district and city councils in Gloucestershire would be replaced by a single unitary authority from April 2028. In September 2026 the reorganisation was paused while the government carried out a review.

=== By-elections ===
==== Innsworth ====
The Innsworth by-election was triggered by the resignation of Paul Ockelton, who had been elected as a Liberal Democrat, after he was convicted of sexually assaulting a child; he had been suspended and then expelled from the Liberal Democrat group.

Innsworth by-election, 1 May 2025
Party	Candidate	Votes	%	±%
Liberal Democrats	Rojina Rai	666	46.6	+16.3
Reform	Graham Bocking	596	41.7	N/A
Labour	Veronica Davies	93	6.5	−14.8
Green	Jonathan Bristow	75	5.2	N/A
Majority		70	4.9	
Turnout		1,442	29.49	
Rejected ballots		12	0.8	
Registered electors		4,890		
Liberal Democrats hold				

==== Northway ====
The Northway by-election was held following the death of independent councillor Elaine MacTiernan, who had represented the ward since 2011, after a diagnosis of cancer.

Northway by-election, 10 July 2025
Party	Candidate	Votes	%	±%
Reform	Graham Bocking	374	41.4	N/A
Liberal Democrats	Guy Fancourt	279	30.9	–0.1
Conservative	Kevin Cromwell	116	12.8	–18.8
Green	James Robins	91	10.1	N/A
Labour	Joe Jones	44	4.9	–21.9
Majority		95	10.5	N/A
Turnout		905	25.31	
Rejected ballots		1	0.1	
Registered electors		3,575		
Reform gain from Independent				
